= Freehold Regional High School District =

School district in Monmouth County, New Jersey, US

Address
- 11 Pine Street Englishtown, Monmouth County, New Jersey, 07726; United States
- Coordinates: 40.29857°N 74.357787°W

District information
- Motto: Charting a Future of Excellence in Education
- Grades: 9-12
- Established: 1953
- President: Peter Bruno
- Superintendent: Nicole P. Hazel
- Business administrator: Sean Boyce
- Accreditations: Middle States Association of Colleges and Schools Commission on Elementary and Secondary Schools
- Schools: 6

Students and staff
- Enrollment: 10,005 (as of 2024–25)
- Faculty: 666.9 FTEs
- Student–teacher ratio: 15.0:1

Other information
- District Factor Group: GH
- Website: www.frhsd.com
Ind.	Per pupil	District spending	Rank (*)	9-12 average	%± vs. average
1A	Total Spending	$16,872	3	$18,891	−10.7%
1	Budgetary Cost	13,119	5	15,592	−15.9%
2	Classroom Instruction	7,854	9	8,807	−10.8%
6	Support Services	1,686	6	2,294	−26.5%
8	Administrative Cost	1,340	5	1,592	−15.8%
10	Operations & Maintenance	1,488	5	1,954	−23.8%
13	Extracurricular Activities	598	8	873	−31.5%
16	Median Teacher Salary	81,180	41	71,726
Data from NJDoE 2014 Taxpayers' Guide to Education Spending. *Of 9-12 districts with any number of students. Lowest spending=1; Highest=47

The Freehold Regional High School District is a public regional school district established in 1953, that serves students in ninth through twelfth grades from eight communities in western Monmouth County, in the U.S. state of New Jersey. The district, with six high schools, is the largest regional high school district in the state, as measured by enrollment. The district serves students from Colts Neck Township, Englishtown, Farmingdale, Freehold Borough, Freehold Township, Howell Township, Manalapan Township and Marlboro Township.

Each of the six high schools is located in their respective communities: Howell High School in Howell Township, Manalapan High School in Manalapan Township, Marlboro High School in Marlboro Township, Colts Neck High School in Colts Neck Township, Freehold Township High School in Freehold Township and Freehold High School in Freehold Borough, although school boundaries do not match municipal boundaries.

As of the 2024–25 school year, the district, comprised of six schools, had an enrollment of 10,005 students and 666.9 classroom teachers (on an FTE basis), for a student–teacher ratio of 15.0:1.

The district has been accredited by the Middle States Association of Colleges and Schools Commission on Elementary and Secondary Schools since 2016.

The Freehold Regional High School District operates 12 specialized Magnet Programs across its six high schools. The programs cover subjects including humanities, law, medical sciences, and engineering. Students enrolled in the programs may take Advanced Placement and college-level courses and participate in activities related to their fields of study. Program participants have also received scholarships, participated in competitions, and attended colleges, universities, and trade schools.

Freehold Township High School and Howell High School have both been named IB World Schools. They are two of the 17 schools in New Jersey that offer the International Baccalaureate (IB) Diploma Programme (DP). Every effort is made to keep special education students in the district; a variety of in-class support, resource center, and self-contained programs are conducted to educate those in need of special education.

== History ==
The school district was created with a referendum on October 6, 1953, in which voters in each of the seven districts united to form the district. The referendum allocated $690,000 (equivalent to $8,300,000 in 2025) to be used for the new regional district to purchase Freehold High School from the Freehold Borough Schools Board of Education.

A referendum for a second high school was passed in March 1962 by a 2-1 margin. The board of education confirmed the name Southern Freehold Regional High School in November 1962 and allocated $2.7 million (equivalent to $28.7 million in 2025) for construction of a building on a 60-acre (24 ha) site to handle an enrollment of up to 1,300 students. Ground was broken in March 1963, with construction set to start a month later and a target completion date of May 1964. The school opened in September 1968, though construction delays meant that the school was not fully complete. When it opened, the Southern Freehold Regional High School attendance zone included all of Farmingdale and Howell Township along with the southern portion of Freehold Township, with all other students remaining at Freehold Regional High School.

With the original high school holding double sessions and rapid growth projected in the district, voters approved a referendum in December 1963 by a nearly 3-2 margin under which the district would spend $161,000 (equivalent to $1,693,000 in 2025) to acquire sites covering 43 acres (17 ha) in Marlboro and 65 acres (26 ha) in Manalapan that would be used for future high schools.

With the opening of the Marlboro High School for the 1968-69 school year, attendance zones were realigned so that Freehold High School (with 1,500 students in grades 9-12) served all students from Freehold Borough and parts of Freehold Township; Howell High School (with 1,500 students in 9-12) served all of Farmingdale and Howell Township, and parts of Freehold Township and Marlboro Township; while Marlboro High School (with 1,100 students in grades 9-12) served all of Colts Neck Township, Englishtown and Marlboro Township, along with parts of Manalapan Township. Constructed at a cost of $3.4 million (equivalent to $31.5 million in 2025), Marlboro High School opened in late October 1968.

Freehold Township High School and Manalapan High School, the district's fourth and fifth facilities, were constructed with identical designs. Groundbreaking for both schools took place in August 1969 and the two schools opened in September 1971, having been completed at a combined cost of $10.4 million (equivalent to $82.7 million in 2025). Manalapan High School opened with an enrollment of 900 students from Englishtown and Manalapan Township, who had previously attended Marlboro High School. Freehold High School was closed for a $300,000 renovation project during the 1971-72 school year, during which it operated with 1,600 students using the new building that had been completed for Freehold Township High School.

In September 1986, after a decade-long effort, voters approved a referendum for the creation of a high school in Colts Neck by a 58%-42% margin, with Colts Neck Township residents providing much of the margin for passage. By 1988, the costs of construction of the new high school had jumped by millions of dollars, exceeding the amount available from the referendum to cover the costs, leading to further delays. In February 1993, a judge ruled that the district had to move forward with construction of the new high school and could not put forth a referendum to undo the 1986 vote and the New Jersey Supreme Court refused to hear the case. Construction began in August 1996, with expectations to have the building open in September 1998 to handle 750 incoming students, with an eventual capacity for 1,300. Colts Neck High School opened in September 1998 as the sixth high school in the system, with 380 students in ninth and tenth grades.

Since the start of the 2016–17 school year, students in grades 9 through 12 from Naval Weapons Station Earle started attending Colts Neck High School, before which they had attended Monmouth Regional High School in Tinton Falls.

The district had been classified by the New Jersey Department of Education as being in District Factor Group "GH", the third-highest of eight groupings. District Factor Groups organize districts statewide to allow comparison by common socioeconomic characteristics of the local districts. From lowest socioeconomic status to highest, the categories are A, B, CD, DE, FG, GH, I and J.

== Schools ==
Attendance at each of the district's six schools is based on where the student lives in relation to the district's high schools. While many students attend the school in their hometown, others attend a school located outside their own municipality. In order to balance enrollment, district lines are redrawn for the six schools to address issues with overcrowding and spending in regards to transportation. Schools in the district (with 2024–25 enrollment data from the National Center for Education Statistics) with their attendance zones for incoming students are:

- Colts Neck High School with 1,430 students from Colts Neck Township (all), Howell (part) and Marlboro (part).
  - Brian P. Donahue, principal
- Freehold High School with 1,376 students from Freehold (all) and Freehold Township (part).
  - James H. Brown Jr., principal
- Freehold Township High School with 1,813 students from Freehold Township (part), Howell (part), Manalapan (part).
  - Alicia K. Scelso, principal
- Howell High School with 1,775 students from Farmingdale (all) and Howell (part).
  - Jeremy Braverman, principal
- Manalapan High School with 1,690 students from Englishtown (all) and Manalapan (part).
  - Shawn Currie, principal
- Marlboro High School with 1,700 students from Marlboro (part).
  - Jennifer Dellett, principal

Effective for entering freshmen, students from each of the municipalities are assigned to attend the specified schools:

- Colts Neck to Colts Neck H.S.
- Englishtown to Manalapan H.S.
- Farmingdale to Howell H.S.
- Freehold Borough to Freehold Borough H.S.
- Freehold Township to Freehold Borough H.S. or Freehold Township H.S.
- Howell to Colts Neck H.S., Freehold Township H.S. or Howell H.S.
- Manalapan to Freehold Township H.S. or Manalapan H.S.
- Marlboro to Colts Neck H.S. or Marlboro H.S.

== Magnet programs ==
Students may apply to attend one of the district's specialized magnet programs, each listed at one of the district's high schools.

- Science and Engineering Learning Center at Manalapan High School
- Medical Sciences Program at Freehold High School
- Business Administration Learning Center at Marlboro High School
- Scholars' Center for the Humanities - Howell High School
- Global Studies Learning Center at Freehold Township High School
- Center for Law and Public Service at Colts Neck High School
- Naval JROTC - Colts Neck High School
- Law Enforcement and Public Safety - Manalapan High School
- Culinary Arts and Hospitality Management - Freehold High School
- Computer Science - Freehold High School
- Fine and Performing Arts - Howell High School
- Animal and Botanical Sciences - Freehold Township High School

== Administration ==
Core members of the district's administration are:

- Nicole P. Hazel, superintendent (as of November 1, 2023)
- Alex Ferreira, assistant superintendent for business administration and board secretary

== Board of education ==
The district's board of education, comprised of nine members from each of the constituent districts, sets policy and oversees the fiscal and educational operation of the district through its administration. As a Type II school district, the board's trustees are elected directly by voters to serve three-year terms of office on a staggered basis, with three seats up for election each year held (since 2012) as part of the November general election. The board appoints a superintendent to oversee the district's day-to-day operations and a business administrator to supervise the business functions of the district. Each member is allocated a fraction of a vote that totals to nine points.

Members of the board of education are:

- Michael Messinger (President) - Marlboro Township (1.4 vote)
- Jamie Bruno (Vice President) - Manalapan Township (1.4 vote)
- Zack Metzger - Howell Township (1.0 vote)
- Peter Bruno - Howell Township (1.0 vote)
- Diana Cappiello - Englishtown Borough (0.5 vote)
- Carl Accettola - Colts Neck (0.9 vote)
- Elizabeth Higley - Freehold Township (1.4 vote)
- Kathie Lavin - Farmingdale Borough (0.5 vote)
- Amanda McCobb- Freehold Borough (0.9 vote)

== Notable alumni ==
- Bonnie Bernstein (Howell HS), ESPN sports reporter
- Scott Conover (Freehold HS), former Detroit Lions offensive tackle (1991–96)
- David DeJesus (Manalapan HS), MLB player on the Chicago Cubs
- Dan Klecko (Marlboro HS), NFL football player and son of Joe Klecko
- Danny Lewis (Freehold HS), former NFL player
- Craig Mazin (Medical Sciences Program at Freehold HS, class of 1988), screenwriter, director and producer
- Jim Nantz (Marlboro HS), sports commentator for CBS Sports
- Tom Pelphrey (Howell HS), actor, Guiding Light
- Kal Penn (Freehold Twp. and Howell HS), actor, Harold & Kumar Go to White Castle, The Namesake.
- Tim Perry (Freehold HS), former NBA player
- Amy Polumbo (Fine and Performing Arts Academy at Howell HS, class of 2003), Miss New Jersey, 2007
- Darrell Reid (Freehold HS), Indianapolis Colts Defensive end
- Michael "The Situation" Sorrentino (Manalapan HS), of Jersey Shore
- Gregg and Evan Spiridellis (Marlboro HS) - two brothers who launched the internet media company JibJab
- Bruce Springsteen (Freehold HS), musician
- Jade Yorker (Manalapan HS), actor
