= Marlboro High School =

High school in Monmouth County, New Jersey, US

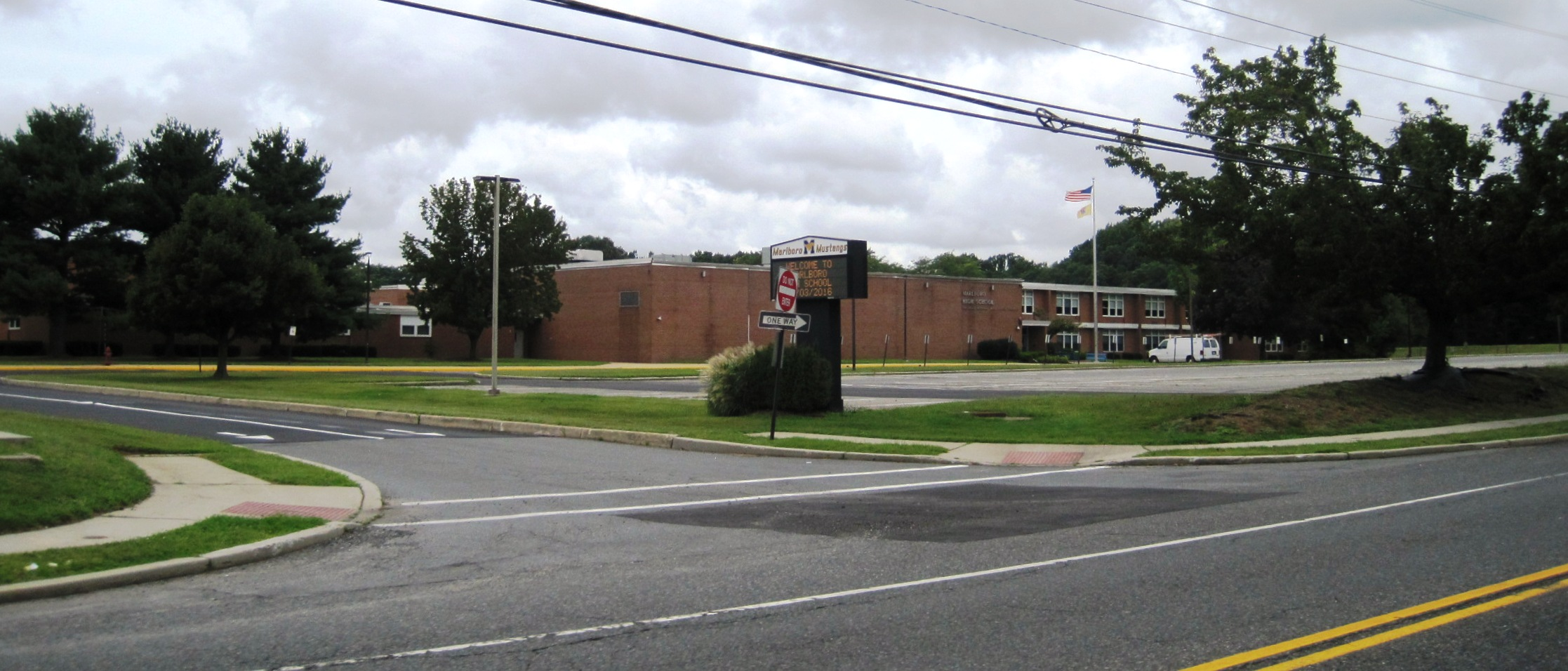

Location
- 95 Route 79; Marlboro, Monmouth County, New Jersey 07746; United States; 40.330513°N 74.24538°W

Information
- Type: Public high school
- Motto: "The Struggle Makes Us Who We Are"
- Established: 1968
- School district: Freehold Regional High School District
- NCES School ID: 340561003804
- Principal: Jennifer Dellett
- Faculty: 108.0 FTEs
- Grades: 9-12
- Enrollment: 1,700 (as of 2024–25)
- Student to teacher ratio: 15.7:1
- Colors: Navy blue and gold
- Athletics conference: Shore Conference
- Team name: Mustangs
- Accreditation: Middle States Association of Colleges and Schools
- Newspaper: Hitching Post
- Website: marlboro.frhsd.com

Marlboro High School is a four-year comprehensive public high school located in Marlboro Township, in Monmouth County, in the U.S. state of New Jersey, serving students in ninth through twelfth grades as one of the six secondary schools of the Freehold Regional High School District. The school serves students from portions of Marlboro Township. Marlboro High School hosts the Business Administration Magnet Program, a selective magnet program offered within Freehold Regional High School District, so there are students attending Marlboro High School from across the county. Students that are a part of the Business Administration Magnet Program take advanced classes that are more in-depth than regular classes. The school has been accredited by the Middle States Association of Colleges and Schools Commission on Elementary and Secondary Schools since 1974 and is accreditted until July 2025.

Students at Marlboro High School all come from Marlboro Township, with other students from Marlboro attending Colts Neck High School. The Freehold Regional High School District serves students from Colts Neck Township, Englishtown, Farmingdale, Freehold Borough, Freehold Township, Howell Township, Manalapan Township and Marlboro Township.

As of the 2024–25 school year, the school had an enrollment of 1,700 students and 108.0 classroom teachers (on an FTE basis), for a student–teacher ratio of 15.7:1. There were 158 students (9.3% of enrollment) eligible for free lunch and 27 (1.6% of students) eligible for reduced-cost lunch.

== History ==
With the original Freehold High School holding double sessions and rapid growth projected in the district, even with the new Southern Freehold Regional High School (to be renamed Howell High School) on the way, voters approved a referendum in December 1963 by a nearly 3-2 margin under which the district would spend $161,000 (equivalent to $1,693,000 in 2025) to acquire sites covering 43 acres (17 ha) in Marlboro and 65 acres (26 ha) in Manalapan that would be used for future high schools.

Due to delays in opening Marlboro High School at the start of the 1968–69 school year, students assigned to the school attended split sessions in the afternoon at Freehold High School.

Constructed at a cost of $3.4 million (equivalent to $31.5 million in 2025), the school opened in late October 1968.

Marlboro High School served all students from Colts Neck Township until Colts Neck High School opened in 1998.

== Awards, recognition and rankings ==
In its listing of "America's Best High Schools 2016", the school was ranked 421st out of 500 best high schools in the country; it was ranked 46th among all high schools in New Jersey and 29th among the state's non-magnet schools.

In Newsweek magazine's report on "America's Top High Schools" for 2014, Marlboro High School was ranked 46th in the nation and 6th in New Jersey, among participating public high schools including some of the nation's top magnet schools.

The school was the 9th-ranked public high school in New Jersey out of 339 schools statewide in New Jersey Monthly magazine's September 2014 cover story on the state's "Top Public High Schools", using a new ranking methodology. The school had been ranked 123rd in the state of 328 schools in 2012, after being ranked 93rd in 2010 out of 322 schools listed. The magazine ranked the school 117th in 2008 out of 316 schools. The school was ranked 76th in the magazine's September 2006 issue, which surveyed 316 schools across the state.

In its 2014 report on "America's Best High Schools", The Daily Beast ranked the school 118th in the nation among participating public high schools and 15th among schools in New Jersey, improving from the previous year's 343rd and 26th-place rankings, respectively.

Schooldigger.com ranked the school 34th out of 381 public high schools statewide in its 2011 rankings (an increase of 16 positions from the 2010 ranking) which were based on the combined percentage of students classified as proficient or above proficient on the mathematics (93.2%) and language arts literacy (98.6%) components of the High School Proficiency Assessment (HSPA).

In the 2011 "Ranking America's High Schools" issue by The Washington Post, the school was ranked 71st in New Jersey and 2,049th nationwide.

In 2001, Marlboro High School's Academic Challenge team won runner-up (second place) from an original field of 113 teams in the statewide final competition. The team was honored with a New Jersey Senate floor resolution at the Statehouse in Trenton on June 7, 2001. The Rutgers Academic Challenge was an interscholastic statewide competition for high school teams that promoted academic excellence and team building through hands-on, multidisciplinary activities that engaged their knowledge and critical thinking skills. The competition included segments of problem-solving activities in the areas of mathematics, science, social studies and language arts.

In 2006, Principal James Mullevey was named Administrator of the Year by the New Jersey Association of Student Councils (NJASC).

In the late 1970s and early 1980s, Marlboro High School's Debate Team was nationally recognized as a consistent powerhouse and frequent invitee to elite, invitation only events. In 1981, the team of Meredith McClintock and Andrea Alterman completed their high school debate careers as one of the top-ranked teams in the nation.

In 2017, the Marlboro High School We The People team defeated East Brunswick High School to win the state We The People title for the first time in school history; East Brunswick had won the state competition 27 of the past 30 years, Marlboro defeating East Brunswick in the 30th year. Subsequently, the team was invited to compete in the 2017 national We the People: The Citizen and the Constitution competition, representing the state of New Jersey in the process.

== Business Administration Magnet Program ==
The Business Administration Magnet Program at Marlboro High School offers a four-year program of study to a limited number of academically motivated students who wish to develop their interests in the areas of business and management. The program is focused through the study of targeted courses, which include finance, management, economics, law, and computer technology.

Students are encouraged to apply and practice the academic knowledge gained in the classroom through participation in various competitions sponsored by the Future Business Leaders of America and the Federal Reserve Bank.

== Athletics ==
The Marlboro High School Mustangs compete in Division A North of the Shore Conference, an athletic conference comprised of public and private high schools in Monmouth and Ocean counties, along the Jersey Shore. The conference operates under the jurisdiction of the New Jersey State Interscholastic Athletic Association (NJSIAA). With 1,363 students in grades 10–12, the school was classified by the NJSIAA for the 2019–20 school year as Group IV for most athletic competition purposes, which included schools with an enrollment of 1,060 to 5,049 students in that grade range. The school was classified by the NJSIAA as Group IV South for football for 2024–2026, which included schools with 890 to 1,298 students.

The school participates as the host school / lead agency in a joint ice hockey team with Holmdel High School. The co-op program operates under agreements scheduled to expire June 30, 2028.

The girls' tennis team won the Group IV state title in 1987 (defeating Ridgewood High School in the final match of the tournament), 1988 (vs. Morris Knolls High School), 1990 (vs. Livingston High School), 1991 (vs. Livingston), 1992 (vs. Ridgewood) and 1993 (vs. Ridgewood); the team won the Tournament of Champions in 1990 (vs. Red Bank Catholic High School in the finals) and 1991 (vs. Moorestown High School). The 1987 team won the Group IV title with a 3–2 win against Ridgewood in the final match of the tournament.

The girls' indoor track team won the Group IV state championship in 1991.

In 1994, the football team won the Central Jersey Group IV state sectional championship, completing a 10–1 season with a 27–13 victory over Piscataway High School at Giants Stadium.

In 2001, his senior year, Ty Jensen was the first Marlboro track and field athlete to win a title in every championship race during a single season. In the 1600 meter run, Jensen was the Monmouth County Champion, Shore Conference Champion, Central Jersey Group IV Champion, Group IV State Champion and the overall Meet of Champions Champion. He still holds the school record for the 1600 meter run with a time of 4:12.

The girls' basketball team won the 2003 Group IV state championship, defeating East Orange Campus High School by a score of 84–69 in the final game of the playoff tournament. In 2015, the girls varsity basketball team won the Central Jersey Group IV state sectional championship, defeating Monroe Township High School in overtime by a score of 60–52 in the tournament final.

The gymnastics team won the overall state championship in 1999.

In 2003, the boys' tennis team won the Group IV state championship, defeating Westfield High School in the finals. The team was ranked first in the state for the entire year. Due to international tournaments, the tennis team could not provide their full-strength team to the Tournament of Champions, and lost 3–2 to Newark Academy in the semifinals to end the season with a 29-2 (with both losses coming to Newark Academy).

In 2009, the boys' soccer team became A-North Shore Conference champions, the first time in school history. In that same season another school first had been accomplished when the boys' soccer team won the Shore Conference Tournament with a 2–1 win in the tournament final over Christian Brothers Academy, having lost the previous season's final to Freehold Township High School.

In 2011, the hockey team won the Shore Conference Division D title, the first championship of the school's hockey program. The team won the Dowd Cup in 2011.

In 2013, the boys' sprint medley relay team, consisting of Chaz Byrnes, Ruben Cruz, Zac Vignola, and Brandon Mazzarella, became the first ever boys' relay team from the district to win a Group IV state title. Later in that same year, Sprint Medley anchor, Brandon Mazzarella, went on to win the Shore Conference Title in the 800 Meter Run.

== Administration ==
The school's principal is Jennifer Dellett, whose core administration team includes three assistant principals.

== Other high schools in the district ==
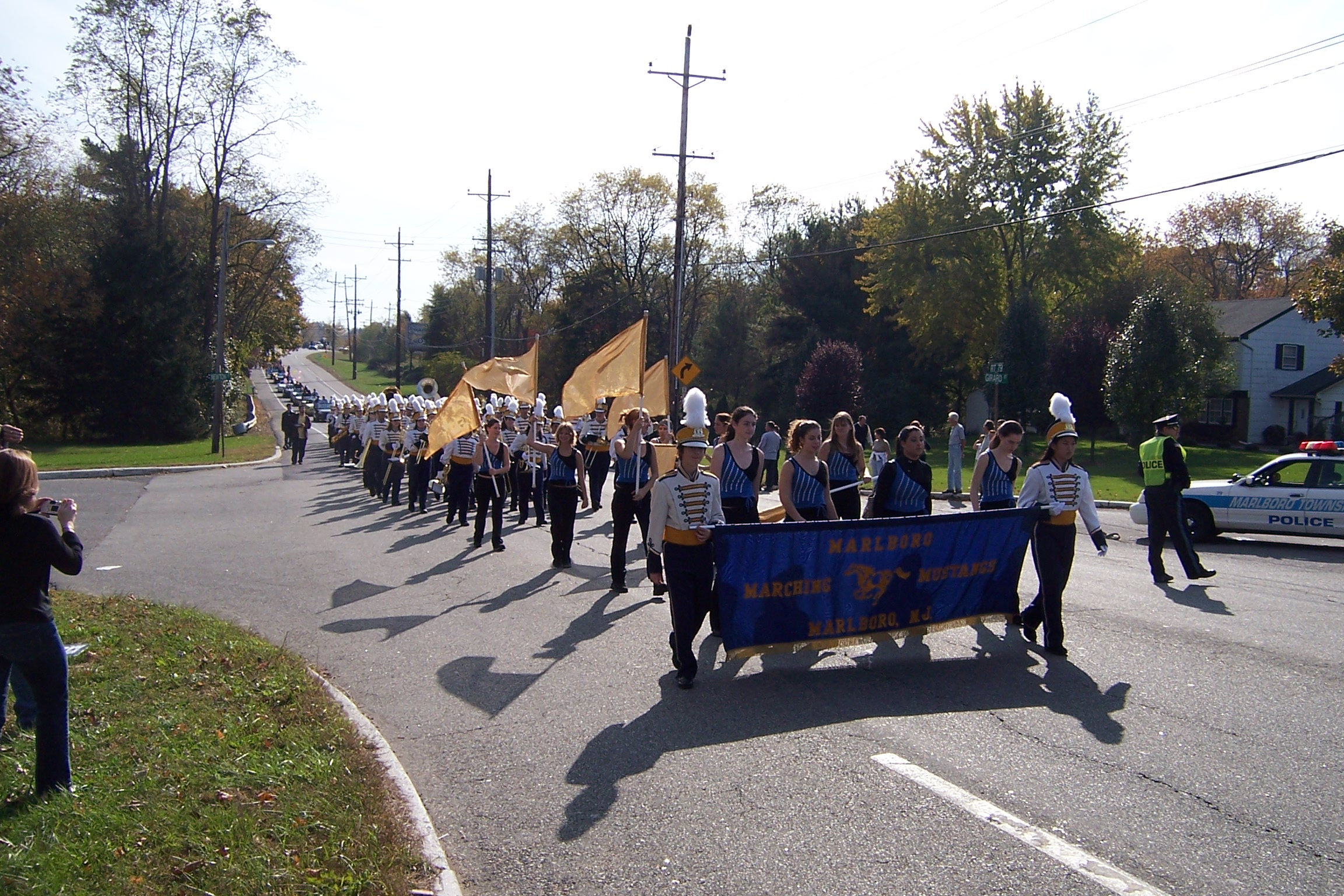
Marlboro High School Marching Band on Route 79 during Homecoming Parade 2005.

Attendance at each of the district's high schools is based on where the student lives in relation to the district's high schools. While many students attend the school in their hometown, others attend a school located outside their own municipality. In order to balance enrollment, district lines are redrawn for the six schools to address issues with overcrowding and spending in regards to transportation. Schools in the district (with 2024–25 enrollment data from the National Center for Education Statistics) with their attendance zones for incoming students are:

- Colts Neck High School with 1,430 students from Colts Neck Township (all), Howell (part) and Marlboro (part)
- Freehold High School with 1,376 students from Freehold (all) and Freehold Township (part)
- Freehold Township High School with 1,813 students from Freehold Township (part), Howell (part), Manalapan (part)
- Howell High School with 1,775 students from Farmingdale (all) and Howell (part)
- Manalapan High School with 1,690 students from Englishtown (all) and Manalapan (part)

== Notable alumni ==
- David Chalian (born 1973), journalist
- Denis Douglin (born 1988), professional boxer
- Josh Flitter (born 1994), actor most noted for starring in the movies The Greatest Game Ever Played and Nancy Drew
- Keith Glauber (born 1972), former MLB pitcher who played for the Cincinnati Reds
- Hunter Gorskie (born 1991), professional soccer defender for the New York Cosmos
- Dan Klecko (born 1981), NFL football player and son of Joe Klecko
- Stephanie Klemons (born 1982, class of 2000), Broadway performer and choreographer, who was the associate choreographer and original dance captain of the Broadway musical Hamilton
- Jeff Kwatinetz (born 1965), talent manager
- Miles Macik (born 1973), football player who played in seven games during his one-year career with the Detroit Lions
- David Magidoff (born 1982/83), actor and comedian known for his roles in Dexter: New Blood and The Morning Show
- Sarah Mergenthaler (born 1979), member of the 2008 US Olympic Sailing Team who competed in the women's 470
- Adam Mesh (born 1975), winner of Average Joe and star of Average Joe: Adam Returns reality shows
- Jim Nantz (born 1959), lead play-by-play broadcaster for CBS Sports
- Kevin Politz (born 1996), soccer player who plays for the New York Red Bulls in Major League Soccer
- Melissa Rauch (born 1980), actress who appears in The Big Bang Theory
- Howie Roseman (born 1975), General Manager of the Philadelphia Eagles
- Gregg and Evan Spiridellis, two brothers who launched the internet media company JibJab
- Felicia Stoler, host of Honey, We're Killing the Kids on The Learning Channel
- Paul Wesley (born 1982), actor most noted for playing vampire Stefan Salvatore on CW's drama The Vampire Diaries
- Sharnee Zoll-Norman (born 1986), point guard who has played for the Chicago Sky of the WNBA
