= Felicia Stoler =

Felicia Stoler, D.C.N. is an American clinical nutritionist, registered dietitian, and exercise physiologist. She hosted Honey, We're Killing the Kids, a television series originally developed by the BBC that shows parents the consequences of poor parenting, using computer-generated images of what their children may look like as adults if they continue with their present life-style, dietary and exercise habits. Stoler has hosted the American edition, which appears as a one-hour weekly series on The Learning Channel in the United States and the Food Network in Canada.

Stoler attended Tulane University, where she graduated with a Bachelor of Arts degree in political science and sociology. She attended Columbia University, where she majored in applied physiology and nutrition and was awarded a Master of Science degree. In 2008, she completed a doctorate in clinical nutrition (D.C.N.) at the University of Medicine and Dentistry of New Jersey. Stoler is a member of the Forbes Health Medical Advisory Board.

Stoler grew up in Marlboro Township, New Jersey, where she attended Marlboro Middle School and Marlboro High School. As of 2007, she lived with her children in nearby Holmdel Township, New Jersey.
