= Death of Kyle Mullen =

2022 death in Navy SEAL training

Kyle Felix Mullen was a former captain of the Yale Bulldogs football team who enlisted in the U.S. Navy after college, and died at age 24 on February 4, 2022, following the "Hell Week" portion of Navy SEAL training.

== Early life, education, and enlistment ==
Mullen grew up in Manalapan Township, New Jersey, and graduated from Manalapan High School in 2015. He was "a star defensive lineman and tight end" on the high school football team, receiving regional all-star and conference Defensive Player of the Year honors. In his senior year, on defense he made 136 tackles (leading his team), 11 sacks, and four fumble recoveries, while on offense he caught six touchdown passes. He was also a starter on the school's basketball team. His high school football coach, Ed Gurrieri, after his death, praised Mullen's character and said that he was "in the National Honor Society and excelled at academics. His GPA was in the 4.2 to 4.4 range when he graduated. He was All State and led our team to its first state championship."

After high school, Mullen attended Yale College, where he was a standout defensive end on the Yale football team through his junior year. In his sophomore year, he led the team with 11 tackles for a loss and six sacks. He started all ten games in his junior year and was named second team all-Ivy. In November 2017, Mullen was elected by his teammates to be the captain of "Team 146," Yale's football team for the 2018 season, in what would have been his senior year. At Yale, he was also a member of the Delta Kappa Epsilon fraternity. The Yale Daily News reported in November 2018 that the football coach had announced in June 2018, before what would have been Mullen's senior year when he would captain the team, that Mullen had withdrawn from Yale for "personal reasons." The college newspaper also reported that a fellow Yale College student had accused Mullen of "sexual penetration without consent." Mullen left Yale before the charges could be adjudicated by the University-Wide Committee on Sexual Misconduct.

Mullen played another season of college football at Monmouth University in 2019, as a postgraduate. While on the Monmouth Hawks football team, he played fourteen games with 26 total tackles. The Asbury Park Press reported that his tackles included 3.5 sacks and that he broke up five passes; the university's site gives different numbers, however, saying that his tackles included "8 solo tackles, 3.5 tackles for a loss, and one sack."

The current head coach of his high school's football team who was an assistant coach when Mullen played, Dom Lepore, said in 2022, "Last summer I would see him at the gym and he came up to me and said he wanted to be a Navy SEAL," and "After getting his degree he had this direction of going into the military and he was training hard to get himself ready for it."

== Death ==
In March 2021, Mullen enlisted in the U.S. Navy, pursuing a dream of becoming a SEAL; he held the rank of seaman. In a notebook during training, Mullen wrote: "I'm not going to die, and if I do I'd rather die here."

Mullen made his first attempt at the SEALs selection course in August 2021; he did not complete the course. He tried again in the course that started in January 2022. Mullen's BUD/S class numbered 210 men at the beginning; by the time "Hell Week" was over, 189 had dropped out or were forced to withdraw due to injury. By the middle of the week, Mullen—although he had begun the course in peak physical condition—suffered from exhaustion, infection, and fluid in the lungs. His condition was completely expected for post Hell Week candidates. On February 4, 2022, Mullen completed the course despite allegedly coughing up blood for days, returned to his barracks, and lay down on his bed. Common practice was to place mattresses on the floor to reduce the risk of falling off the bed while sleeping. Recent reports from Navy officers via the Shawn Ryan Show, suggest a use of performance-enhancing drugs. Namely they found schedule-3 unprescribed drugs in Mullen’s vehicle, as released on an October 2026 episode of Mike Ritland's Mike Drop. Mullen was seen by three separate physicians and other various medical professionals who all logged satisfactory vitals. He had no fever, acceptable oxygen saturation, and complained only of knee pain. He was treated with prophalactic antibiotics throughout the duration of Hell Week, as was the rest of his class. Shortly after medical checks were complete, Mullen's health suddenly and rapidly decompensated. Navy qualified watchstanders asked him multiple times if he needed medical help and would like 9-11 attention. He declined medical care each time. Eventually his personal wishes were disregarded and he was rushed to the closest Emergency Room. He was declared deceased at about 5:42 p.m., at the Sharp Coronado Hospital in San Diego. He was 24 years old. The formal cause of death was listed as bacterial pneumonia, specifically acute pneumonia caused by Streptococcus pyogenes. The subsequent Navy investigation determined that it was possible Mullen suffered from swimming-induced pulmonary edema (SIPE). Both a private autopsy and a military autopsy (conducted by the U.S. Army regional medical examiner, dated in May 2022) were performed. However, the investigative process was rightly scrutinized when it was discovered the autopsy pathologist chose not to test his body for the specific black-market drugs recovered in his vehicle, despite the fact that an NCIS agent was present in the room and informed the pathologist of the comprehensive list. Additionally, the vials of drugs were never tested by NCIS to verify chemical components or potential contaminants. Other witnesses allege they saw Mullen use those drugs after medical checks were complete, just prior to his rapid decompensation. An initial Line of Duty Investigation (LODI) did in fact determine that the drugs were likely a contributing factor in his death. However, the U.S. Navy ordered that investigation to be buried and rescoped in a new Line of Duty Investigation that did not reference the drugs in its findings. Despite that falsity, six subject matter expert Navy physicians examined the facts of the case. Five of the six agreed that drugs contributed to Mullen's death, but their testimony was buried in the new LODI as the final enclosures and were not referenced in the executive summary.

On the day Mullen died, after the drugs were discovered, two more candidates who completed "Hell Week" were hospitalized as a precautionary measure, and a third man was also intubated. Mullen was one of at least 11 men to be killed in SEALs training since 1953. Other men in the BUD/S class also suffered from other medical conditions, consistently found after Hell Week, including several with SIPE. Following Mullen's death, the Navy discovered syringes and black-market procured performance-enhancing drugs in his car; including injectible testosterone from Pakistan. The Navy has not linked these to Mullen's death and faced significant scrutiny from the press, the House of Representatives, and the Senate for their investigative malpractice in the case after knowingly mispresenting the facts in a SECNAV press release.

== Investigations into death ==
After Mullen's death, SEAL leadership initially depicted the death as an unusual incident unrelated to the brutal selection course that Mullen had just undergone. The Navy captain overseeing the BUD/S ordered an investigation into Mullen's death, with findings expected in late 2022. The Naval Criminal Investigative Service (NCIS) is investigating. Congressman Andy Kim asked the Department of Defense Office of Inspector General to investigate, but OIG declined to do so while the NCIS investigation is ongoing. Mullen's mother Regina Mullen, a registered nurse, has been outspoken in her criticism of the Navy, saying, "The medical team, the instructors, the lieutenant, the commander had to have known. They had all seen the guy spitting up blood. You sent him to the barracks, sent the medical team home, and you let him die." Navy leadership has stated that Mullen was offered medical assistance on three separate occasions and declined each offer. Leadership maintained that he had the right to refuse treatment and that they lacked the authority to compel him to accept it.

Mullen's death intensified scrutiny of the SEALs' leadership and the selection course, including the failure of Navy medics and other medical staff to promptly hospitalize or monitor Mullen immediately after the course. However, the Bureau of Navy Medicine did an independent investigation and concluced that the standard of medical care was met by each professional. No medical malpractice was discovered. As evidence of this, the Senior Medical Officer involved was completely vindicated and promoted by the Secretary of the Navy, Hung Cao. Broader criticisms of "Hell Week" have focused on SEALs leadership's fostering of culture of brutality, lack of discipline and order, tolerance of serious health risks to personnel, and rampant use of steroids, hormones, and selective androgen receptor modulators (SARMs) among candidates. The candidate graduation rate in the SEALs course has declined over time, from 40% in the 1980s to 14% in 2021 to less than 10% in Mullen's class, which was conducted during the COVID-19 global pandemic. Analysis now shows that as the primary causal factor in the higher attrition during that era. Within Mullen's candidate class, approximate 40 candidates tested positive for, or admitted using, steroids or other drugs. The substances are barred by Navy regulations, but are believed to give candidates a competitive edge and improve their chances of becoming SEALs.

== Honors ==
After his death, New Jersey Governor Phil Murphy said that Mullen "represented the very best of the state and country," and that "he was a legend in athletics and all walks of life." The governor directed flags in the state to fly at half-staff in his honor for a day. He was honored with a street to his name. Manalapan High School, from which Mullen graduated, honored him with a moment of silence.
