= Freehold High School =

High school in Monmouth County, New Jersey, US

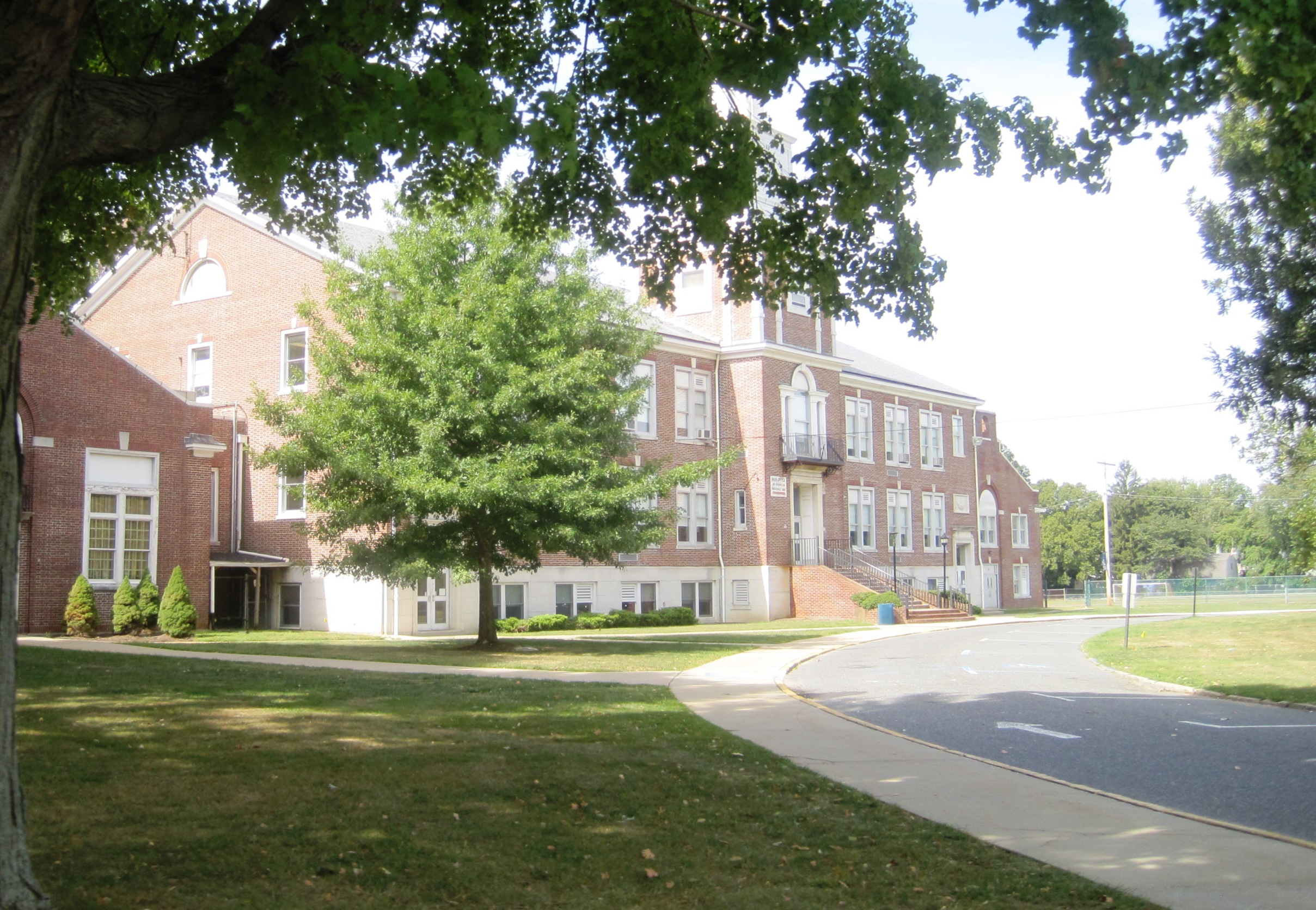
- Freehold High School in September 2015

Location
- 2 Robertsville Road; Freehold Borough, Monmouth County, New Jersey 07728; United States; 40°16′03″N 74°16′05″W

Information
- Type: Public high school
- Motto: "Commitment to Excellence"
- Established: 1923
- School district: Freehold Regional High School District
- NCES School ID: 340561003796
- Principal: James H. Brown Jr.
- Faculty: 97.3 FTEs
- Grades: 9-12
- Enrollment: 1,376 (as of 2024–25)
- Student to teacher ratio: 14.1:1
- Colors: Navy Blue and Old Gold
- Athletics conference: Shore Conference
- Team name: Colonials
- Rivals: Freehold Township High School; Colts Neck High School
- Accreditation: Middle States Association of Colleges and Schools
- Website: freehold.frhsd.com

Freehold High School, sometimes called Freehold Boro, Freehold Borough High School or Boro to distinguish it from Freehold Township High School, is a four-year public high school serving students in ninth through twelfth grades, located within Freehold Borough, in the U.S. state of New Jersey, operating as one of the six secondary schools of the Freehold Regional High School District. Established in 1923, the school serves students from all of Freehold Borough and from portions of Freehold Township. Freehold High School is the home of the Medical Sciences Learning Center, the Computer Science Academy and the Culinary Arts/Hospitality Management Academy. The school has been accredited by the Middle States Association of Colleges and Schools Commission on Elementary and Secondary Schools since 1928; its current accreditation extends to July 2025.

As of the 2024–25 school year, the school had an enrollment of 1,376 students and 97.3 classroom teachers (on an FTE basis), for a student–teacher ratio of 14.1:1. There were 516 students (37.5% of enrollment) eligible for free lunch and 46 (3.3% of students) eligible for reduced-cost lunch.

== History ==
Freehold High School was originally located on the corner of Hudson and Bennett Street in Freehold Borough. At the time it was called the Hudson Street School. It has been at its present location, Robertsville Road and Broadway since 1925. The school is the oldest in the Freehold Regional High School District, having been the original facility that drew students from several Western Monmouth County communities.

Freehold High School, as such, came into being as a result of a referendum vote on October 6, 1953, in which seven districts united to form the Freehold Regional High School District. The referendum allocated $690,000 (equivalent to $8.3 million in 2025) to be used to purchase Freehold High School by the regional district from the Freehold Borough Board of Education.

Freehold Township High School and Manalapan High School, the district's fourth and fifth facilities, were opened in September 1971. Freehold High School was closed for a $300,000 renovation project (equivalent to $2.4 million in 2025) during the 1971-72 school year, during which it operated with 1,600 students using the new building that had been completed for Freehold Township High School.

Freehold High School is by far the most ethnically diverse school in the district. The school has had to face significant Increases in enrollment, going from 941 in 2000–2001 to 1,581 during 2012–2013 school year, a 68% increase. (Statistics as of 2012–2013 school year)

On January 10, 2007, three Freehold High School students were killed in a car accident on Kozloski Road. James Warnock and Michael Dragonetti, both seniors, and Andrew Lundy, a junior, were driving home from school when they hit a van going in the opposite direction. Freehold Boro students held a memorial service for their classmates and gathered at the scene of the accident for days afterwards. The driver of the van, Ruth MacArthur, was killed on impact; the van's only passenger survived.

== Awards, recognition and rankings ==
In May 2007, Newsweek ranked the school 47th-highest in New Jersey.

In September 2014, the school was the 89th-ranked public high school in New Jersey out of 339 schools statewide in New Jersey Monthly magazine's cover story on the state's "Top Public High Schools", using a new ranking methodology. The school had been ranked 164th in the state of 328 schools in 2012, after being ranked 132nd in 2010 out of 322 schools listed. The magazine ranked the school 129th in 2008 out of 316 schools. The school was ranked 95th in the magazine's September 2006 issue, which surveyed 316 schools across the state.

Schooldigger.com ranked the school 112th out of 381 public high schools statewide in its 2011 rankings (a decrease of 34 positions from the 2010 ranking) which were based on the combined percentage of students classified as proficient or above proficient on the mathematics (86.9%) and language arts literacy (95.1%) components of the High School Proficiency Assessment (HSPA).

In 2008 the school was recognized by the Jostens Yearbook Company for their flashback-themed yearbook putting live pictures on both the front and back covers.

== Academic Learning Centers and Academies ==
The Medical Sciences Learning Center is a magnet program in which exceptional students in the sciences and mathematics are able to advance their studies in those fields. Some required classes in this program include Biochemistry/Organic Chemistry, Anatomy and Physiology, and Statistics. A unique required class, Research, involves the creation and experimentation of year long individual research projects culminating in presentations of each students findings. In previous years, students' research projects have been selected for statewide presentations and competitions as well as the Intel Science Talent Search.

Freehold also houses the Computer Science Academy. This specialized academy teaches students about computers, with most of its focus on programming in languages such as Java, Visual Basic, and C++. The program also features study in topics such as data structures and discrete mathematics.

The Culinary Arts / Hospitality Management Academy allows students to work in the student-run, one hundred-seat, fine dining restaurant serving the public, catered events, and school functions. In 2005, the program was selected to present sample menu / recipes at Princeton University's Garden State Series.

=== Medical Sciences Learning Center ===
The Medical Sciences Learning Center (or Med Sci), a specialized academic program within Freehold High School, is a specific course load designed for students interested in continued study of the Medical Sciences. Admittance to the program is highly selective and requires a high enough score on a Mathematics/English Standardized Test and compelling short essays regarding motivation for application.

The program course load comprises the following:

This program accepts 20 kids per year, and you are tested into the program. In the senior year of the program, a monthly externship with the local hospital, CentraState Healthcare System, is required of all the medical sciences students. Students are separated into small groups in which they are sent to different divisions of the hospital to learn hands-on about the different health care occupations. Several areas students have been sent to include the Morgue, Orthopedics, Cardiology, Radiology, etc.

In Junior year, every student must develop his/her own research project over the course of the year. These projects culminate in an individual presentation at the end of the year at the annual Medical Sciences Research Symposium. The best work is then selected and submitted to statewide competitions. In previous years, individuals have also competed in the Intel Science Talent Search for semifinalist placement.

=== Computer Science Academy ===
The Computer Science and Technology Academy (also CSA or Comp Sci) is a four-year program meant to immerse students in the field of computer science early, allowing them to be highly prepared when they enter an undergraduate program. As an academy as opposed to a learning center, students still take those classes that they are most prepared for outside of the academy. Many of the classes the students take are honors or advanced placement.

The academy's classes are designed to give students a little taste of everything with the following three goals:

- To give students a solid and rigorous background in computer science principles, including the requisite mathematical foundations.
- To build proficiency in the problem solving techniques of Computer Science.
- To provide graduates of the Academy with the background and the skills necessary to continue their education in college.

The four computer science and four math classes are as follows:

The computer science math courses include discrete math topics such as graph theory and Boolean algebra.

The Comp Sci Academy has also won a number of computer competitions, participating in events including the ACSL All-Star round for several years. In 2005, the Freehold High School five-person team came in fourth in the Senior Division of the American Computer Science League 2005-06 International All-Star Competition. The academy has also won the New Jersey Institute of Technology high school programming contest, in 2006 (7 of 8 programs complete) and 2008 (8 of 8 programs complete). This was the first time in the competition's history that a team has won twice, and only the second time all 8 programs have been completed. Two teams later won first place in the NJIT high school programming contest in 2011 with 7 out of 8 programs completed and fourth place in 2011's ACSL All-Stars contest for the five-person Senior Division. The 2012 Senior 5 Team won first place in the international ACSL All-Stars contest. In March 2016, teams from the academy won 1st and 3rd places at Monmouth University's High School Programming Contest, marking the second time in two years that a team from the Computer Science Academy has won this competition. In April 2017, teams from the academy won 1st and 4th places at Rowan University's High School Programming Contest, marking the third consecutive year Computer Science Academy students have won this contest, and fifth straight year with teams finishing in the top 3. In February 2018, a team from the Computer Science Academy won 1st place at the Monmouth University High School Programming Contest.

Graduates from the Computer Science Academy have gone on to work at Microsoft, Apple, eBay, Goldman Sachs, Google, Facebook, Riot Games, SpaceX, and Amazon.

=== Culinary Arts Academy ===
The Culinary Arts Academy is a four-year program of study that consists of a wide range of courses, training, experiences, and activities in culinary, hospitality management, and food science. Traditionally, all of the academy's graduates continue their education completing an associate, bachelor, or master level degree in the culinary field. The traditional course work is enhanced by relevant action research projects with the opportunity for "hands on" professional skill development through all operational phases of a fully licensed restaurant, the Five Star Café, a 100-seat restaurant located within Freehold High School. College degree or placement credit, in the culinary content area, may be earned through high school course work tied to an articulation agreement with the Culinary Institute of America. Students are prepared and have the opportunity to take safety and sanitation certification tests that are nationally recognized by the National Restaurant Association's ServSafe. Career portfolios are developed and serve as a means for career placement opportunities and college articulation credits. Career exploration and leadership activities include community service learning projects and professional skill competitions. Students maintain active membership in the nationally recognized [(Skills USA Club and National Technical Honor Society)].

Graduating students annually receive over $250,000 in scholarships and articulation awards. Many graduates of the academy attend the Culinary Institute of America in Hyde Park, New York, and Johnson and Wales University in Providence, Rhode Island, and Miami, Florida. Facilities of the Academy feature the 100-seat dining room, state-of-the-art commercial kitchen, bakery, and lecture room. On March 14, 2007, the Culinary Arts Academy hosted Governor of New Jersey Jon Corzine and members of the New Jersey State Legislature.

== Administration ==
The school's principal is James H. Brown Jr. His core administration team includes three assistant principals.

== Athletics ==
The Freehold High School Colonials compete in Division A North of the Shore Conference, an athletic conference comprised of public and private high schools in Monmouth and Ocean counties along the Jersey Shore. The league operates under the jurisdiction of the New Jersey State Interscholastic Athletic Association (NJSIAA). With 1,015 students in grades 10-12, the school was classified by the NJSIAA for the 2019–20 school year as Group III for most athletic competition purposes, which included schools with an enrollment of 761 to 1,058 students in that grade range. The school was classified by the NJSIAA as Group IV South for football for 2024–2026, which included schools with 890 to 1,298 students. The athletic facilities are named in memory of athletic director Cal Dean Wilson. The school has major rivalries with Freehold Township High School and Colts Neck High School.

The school participates as the host school / lead agency for a joint ice hockey team with Colts Neck High School and Raritan High School. The co-op program operates under agreements scheduled to expire at the end of the 2023–24 school year.

The girls soccer team won the Group III state title in 2006 (as co-champion with Ramapo High School) and 2007 (vs. Ramsey). The team won the 1999 semifinals for Central Jersey, Group II, with a 2–0 win over Somerville High School. The team won the title again in 2001, topping Ridge High School 2–1. The girls' soccer team won the 2006 Central Jersey Group III sectional title, defeating Hopewell Valley Central High School by a score of 1–0 in the tournament final. Coach Moses, the girls' soccer team coach, tied his last game for the state championship, becoming 2006 co-champions after tying Ramapo High School 0–0 in the Group III championship game held at The College of New Jersey. In 2007, the girls soccer team won the Central, Group III state sectional championship with a 3–0 win over Hightstown High School in the tournament final. The 2007 team beat Ramapo by a score of 2–1 in double overtime to win the Group III title outright.

The field hockey team won the Central Jersey Group III state sectional title in 2007, 2010 and 2011, and won the North II Group III state title in 2013 and 2016. The team won the Group III state championships in both 2010 (defeating Wall High School in the finals) and 2011 (vs. Moorestown High School). In 2007, the field hockey team won the North II, Group III state sectional championship with a 3–0 win over Warren Hills High School in the tournament final. In 2010, the varsity field hockey team won the Group III state sectional championship with a 3–2 win against Wall High School on an overtime goal by Emily Wold. The 2011 team repeated as Group III title with a 5-1 win against Moorestown in the championship game.

The football team won the NJSIAA Central Jersey Group III state sectional championship in 2008 and 2010. In 2008, the varsity football team took the Central Jersey Group III title, the program's first sectional championship, defeating Middletown High School South 21–14 in a game played at Rutgers Stadium. In 2010, Freehold's varsity football team beat Middletown High School South again, this time by a score of 14–12, to finish the season with a 10-2 record and earn the school's second Central Jersey Group III title sectional title in three years. In 2010, the traditional Thanksgiving Day game between Freehold and Freehold Township High School returned for the first time since 1999.

The girls' gymnastics team was the team state champion in 2011 and 2012.

== Notable alumni ==
- Daniel Boyarin (born 1946, class of 1964), historian of religion who is Professor of Talmudic Culture at University of California, Berkeley
- Charles H. Brower (1901–1984, class of 1920), advertising executive, copywriter and author
- Billy Brown (born 1944), singer, songwriter, and record producer, who was an original member of the R&B vocal group, Ray, Goodman & Brown
- Scott Conover (born 1968), former Detroit Lions offensive tackle (1991–96)
- George Fischbeck (1922–2015, class of 1938), television weatherman in Albuquerque, New Mexico and Los Angeles
- Michele Fitzgerald (born 1990), winner of Survivor: Kaôh Rōng in 2016, the 32nd season of the reality series
- David Garrison (born 1952, class of 1970), actor best known as the character Steve Rhoades in the television series Married... with Children
- Jim Gary (1939–2006), sculptor known for his large, colorful creations of dinosaurs made from discarded automobile parts
- Robert Kolodny, film director, writer and cinematographer
- Jason Kutney (born 1981), soccer midfielder who played for the Pittsburgh Riverhounds in the USL Professional Division
- Dan Lewis (1936–2015), former NFL player
- Craig Mazin (born 1971), screenwriter, director and producer
- Tim Perry (born 1965), former NBA player
- Darrell Reid (born 1982), former Indianapolis Colts defensive end
- Alex Schibanoff (1919–1995), American football player and track and field athlete who played in the NFL for the Detroit Lions
- Bruce Springsteen (born 1949), rock musician who had great mainstream success with 1975's Born to Run and 1984's Born in the U.S.A.. Springsteen, who has been described by past teachers as being a "loner, who wanted nothing more than to play his guitar", skipped his own graduation ceremony in 1967
- Emily Wold (born 1994, class of 2012), former field hockey player, who played as a midfielder for the United States women's national field hockey team
- Carl R. Woodward (1890–1974, class of 1906), educator and college administrator who served from 1951 to 1958 as the fifth president of the University of Rhode Island

== Other high schools in the district ==
Attendance at each of the district's high schools is based on where the student lives in relation to the district's high schools. While many students attend the school in their hometown, others attend a school located outside their own municipality. In order to balance enrollment, district lines are redrawn for the six schools to address issues with overcrowding and spending in regards to transportation. The other five schools in the district (with 2024–25 enrollment data from the National Center for Education Statistics) with their attendance zones for incoming students are:

- Colts Neck High School with 1,430 students from Colts Neck Township (all), Howell (part) and Marlboro (part)
- Freehold Township High School with 1,813 students from Freehold Township (part), Howell (part), Manalapan (part)
- Howell High School with 1,775 students from Farmingdale (all) and Howell (part)
- Manalapan High School with 1,690 students from Englishtown (all) and Manalapan (part)
- Marlboro High School with 1,700 students from Marlboro (part)
