= Howell High School (New Jersey) =

High school in Monmouth County, NJ, US

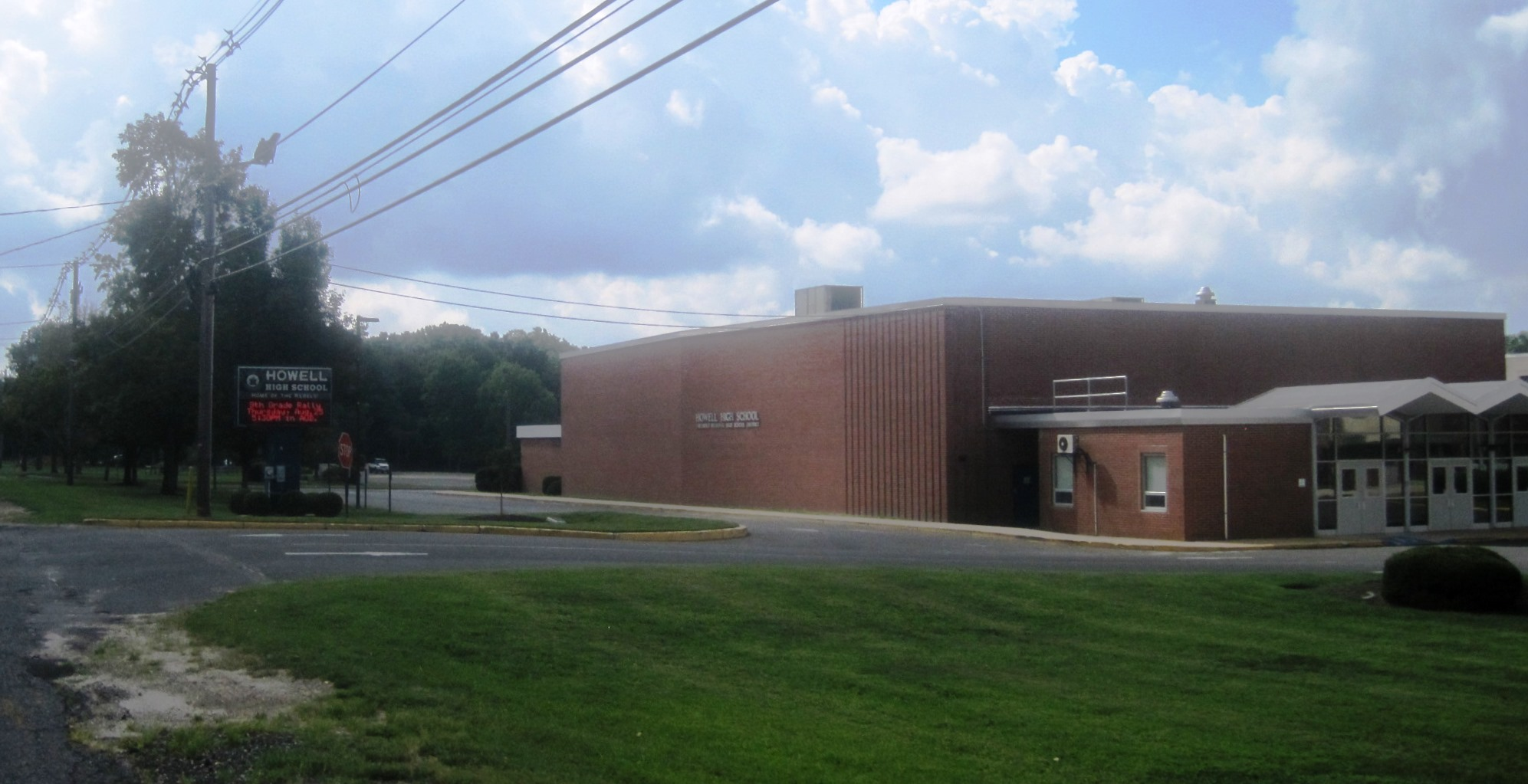

Location
- 405 Squankum-Yellowbrook Road; Howell Township, Monmouth County, New Jersey 07727; United States; 40.18664°N 74.17746°W

Information
- Type: Public high school
- Established: September 1964
- School district: Freehold Regional High School District
- NCES School ID: 340561003800
- Principal: Jeremy Braverman
- Faculty: 128.2 FTEs
- Grades: 9-12
- Enrollment: 1,775 (as of 2024–25)
- Student to teacher ratio: 13.9:1
- Colors: Navy blue and silver
- Athletics conference: Shore Conference
- Team name: Rebels
- Accreditation: Middle States Association of Colleges and Schools
- Yearbook: Echo
- Website: howell.frhsd.com

Howell High School is a four-year comprehensive public high school serving students in ninth through twelfth grades located in Howell Township in Monmouth County, in the U.S. state of New Jersey, operating as one of six secondary schools of the Freehold Regional High School District. The school serves all students from Farmingdale and those from some portions of Howell Township. The school has been accredited by the Middle States Association of Colleges and Schools Commission on Elementary and Secondary Schools since 1970; the school's accreditation runs through July 2025. Although located in Howell, the school has a Farmingdale mailing address.

As of the 2024–25 school year, the school had an enrollment of 1,775 students and 128.2 classroom teachers (on an FTE basis), for a student–teacher ratio of 13.9:1. There were 275 students (15.5% of enrollment) eligible for free lunch and 40 (2.3% of students) eligible for reduced-cost lunch.

The school hosts the Fine & Performing Arts Center (FPAC) and the Scholars' Center for the Humanities.

Blue and gray are the school colors, although originally all schools in the district had blue and gold as the school colors at least until the late 1970s. This was originally done so the district could attempt to realize some cost savings on uniforms for extracurriculars.

== History ==
After voters rejected a June 1961 referendum for a 1,600-student capacity school, a ballot question for a facility to serve 300 fewer students was passed in March 1962 by a 2-1 margin. The board of education confirmed the name Southern Freehold Regional High School in November 1962, despite efforts by Howell Township to have the school named after the host community. The district allocated $2.7 million (equivalent to $28.7 million in 2025) for construction of a building on a 60-acre (24 ha) site to handle an enrollment of up to 1,300 students. Ground was broken in March 1963, with construction set to start a month later and a target completion date of May 1964.

The school opened in September 1964, though construction delays meant that the school was not fully complete. When it opened, the Southern Freehold Regional High School attendance zone included all of Farmingdale and Howell Township along with the southern portion of Freehold Township.

The school mascot is the Rebel, which had been depicted as a Confederate Army soldier with white hair and a gray uniform. The mascot was selected due to the school's original name, "Southern Freehold Regional High School," which lasted until the district expanded to three schools in 1968 when the school was renamed as Howell High School. While the nickname Rebels was retained after a redesign for the 2020-21 school year, the mascot was redesigned to look like an American soldier from the American Revolutionary War.

== Awards, recognition and rankings ==
The school was the 107th-ranked public high school in New Jersey out of 339 schools statewide in New Jersey Monthly magazine's September 2014 cover story on the state's "Top Public High Schools", using a new ranking methodology. The school had been ranked 187th in the state of 328 schools in 2012, after being ranked 174th in 2010 out of 322 schools listed. The magazine ranked the school 159th in 2008 out of 316 schools. The school was ranked 181st in the magazine's September 2006 issue, which surveyed 316 schools across the state. Schooldigger.com ranked the school 67th out of 381 public high schools statewide in its 2011 rankings (a decrease of 16 positions from the 2010 ranking) which were based on the combined percentage of students classified as proficient or above proficient on the mathematics (88.0%) and language arts literacy (98.7%) components of the High School Proficiency Assessment (HSPA).

== Magnet programs ==
=== Fine and Performing Arts Center ===
The FPAC program consists of actors, dancers, and Music, Video & Production (MVP) students. Students work for four years to hone their skills in one of these three aspects. Although many students of the FPAC program work in the Drama Club, it is open to any student of Howell High School. Classes that can be taken through the learning academy are: Honors Acting I, Honors Acting II, Honors Music Technology, Honors Video Technology, Honors Media Study, Honors Dance I, Honors Dance II, Honors Dance IV, Honors Acting IV, Honors Music Studio, Honors Video Studio, Honors Music/Video Production, and Honors Video Production.

=== Humanities Scholar Center ===
The Humanities Program consists of a wide variety of students, who take part in advanced classes on history, art, literature, computer applications and philosophy. Their history class, English class and elective are exclusively for Humanities students. Courses that can be taken are: AP English Literature and Composition, AP Seminar, AP Research, Honors Humanities English, Technology Literacy, AP World History: Modern, Honors Topics in Philosophy, AP US History, Honors Modern Art in America, Honors US History 1, and AP English Language and Composition.

== Athletics ==
The Howell High School Rebels compete in Division A North of the Shore Conference, an athletic conference comprised of public and private high schools in Monmouth County and Ocean County along the Jersey Shore. The league operates under the jurisdiction of the New Jersey State Interscholastic Athletic Association. With 1,536 students in grades 10-12, the school was classified by the NJSIAA for the 2019–20 school year as Group IV for most athletic competition purposes, which included schools with an enrollment of 1,060 to 5,049 students in that grade range. The school was classified by the NJSIAA as Group V South for football for 2024–2026, which included schools with 1,333 to 2,324 students.

The school participates as the host school / lead agency for a joint ice hockey team with Matawan Regional High School. The co-op program operates under agreements scheduled to expire at the end of the 2023–24 school year.

The boys' track team won the Group IV spring / outdoor track state championship in 1968.

The boys' soccer team finished the 1972 season with a record of 18-0 after winning the Group III state championship, defeating River Dell High School in the tournament final played at Glassboro State College by a score of 1-0, one of the team's 12 shutouts that year.

The girls' bowling team (with a pinfall total of 2,806) won the overall state championship in 2002, defeating Brick Township High School (2,759) and Brick Memorial High School (2,675).

The 2007 football team won the Central Jersey, Group IV state sectional championship with a 46–13 win over West Windsor-Plainsboro High School South in a game played at Rutgers Stadium. The win was the first sectional title in team history.

The ice hockey team won the Dowd Cup in 2009.

The boys' wrestling team won the Central Jersey Group IV state sectional championship in 2014, won the Central Jersey Group V title in 2016 and 2018 and won the South Jersey Group V title in 2017. The team won the Group V state championship in 2017 and 2018. In 2017, the wrestling team won the overall Group V state championship, the program's first, with a 28–27 win against Hunterdon Central Regional High School, earning the team a ranking of fifth in the state in the final season rankings by the New Jersey Wrestling Writers Association.

The baseball team won the Group IV state championship in 2022, with a 9–8 victory against Hunterdon Central Regional High School in the tournament final.

== Administration ==
The school's principal is Jeremy Braverman, whose administration team includes three assistant principals.

== Other high schools in the district ==
Attendance at each of the district's high schools is based on where the student lives in relation to the district's high schools. While many students attend the school in their hometown, others attend a school located outside their own municipality. In order to balance enrollment, district lines are redrawn for the six schools to address issues with overcrowding and spending in regards to transportation. The other five schools in the district (with 2024–25 enrollment data from the National Center for Education Statistics) with their attendance zones for incoming students are:

- Colts Neck High School with 1,430 students from Colts Neck Township (all), Howell (part) and Marlboro (part)
- Freehold High School with 1,376 students from Freehold (all) and Freehold Township (part)
- Freehold Township High School with 1,813 students from Freehold Township (part), Howell (part), Manalapan (part)
- Manalapan High School with 1,690 students from Englishtown (all) and Manalapan (part)
- Marlboro High School with 1,700 students from Marlboro (part)

== Notable alumni ==
- Jay Alders (born 1973, class of 1991), fine artist
- Bonnie Bernstein (born 1970), ESPN sports reporter
- Cody Calafiore (born 1990), winner of Big Brother 24
- Paulie Calafiore (born 1988), television personality
- Sopan Deb (born 1988), journalist who works as a culture reporter for The New York Times
- Tom Fitzgerald (born 1966, class of 1984), news anchor for Fox 5 News WTTG in Washington D.C
- Lindsey Gallo (born 1981), middle-distance runner
- Bill Hill (born 1959), former cornerback who played in the NFL for the Dallas Cowboys who was named as head football coach at Howell High School in 2021
- Herman Hill (1945–1970), professional baseball outfielder who appeared in 43 games for the Minnesota Twins
- Kevin Interdonato (born 1979, class of 1997), actor who appeared on several episodes of the HBO series The Sopranos
- Sandje Ivanchukov (1960–2007), soccer defender who played professionally in the North American Soccer League, American Soccer League and Major Indoor Soccer League
- Brian Jude (born 1971, class of 1989), filmmaker, producer of Under the Raven's Wing and other feature films
- Rob Kinelski (born 1981), mixing engineer, sound engineer and record producer
- Joanne Nosuchinsky (born 1988), actress and beauty pageant titleholder
- Tom Pelphrey (born 1982), actor known for Guiding Light and Ozark; Daytime Emmy Award winner
- Kal Penn (born 1977), actor who attended the Performing Arts program at Howell but transferred to and graduated from Freehold Township High School
- Frankie Perez (born 1989), mixed martial artist specializing in Brazilian jiu-jitsu who has competed in Ultimate Fighting Championship
- Amy Polumbo (born 1984), Miss New Jersey 2007
- Denny Walling (born 1954), Major League Baseball player in the 1980s who played predominantly for the Houston Astros
