= Tom Fitzgerald (reporter) =

American television reporter

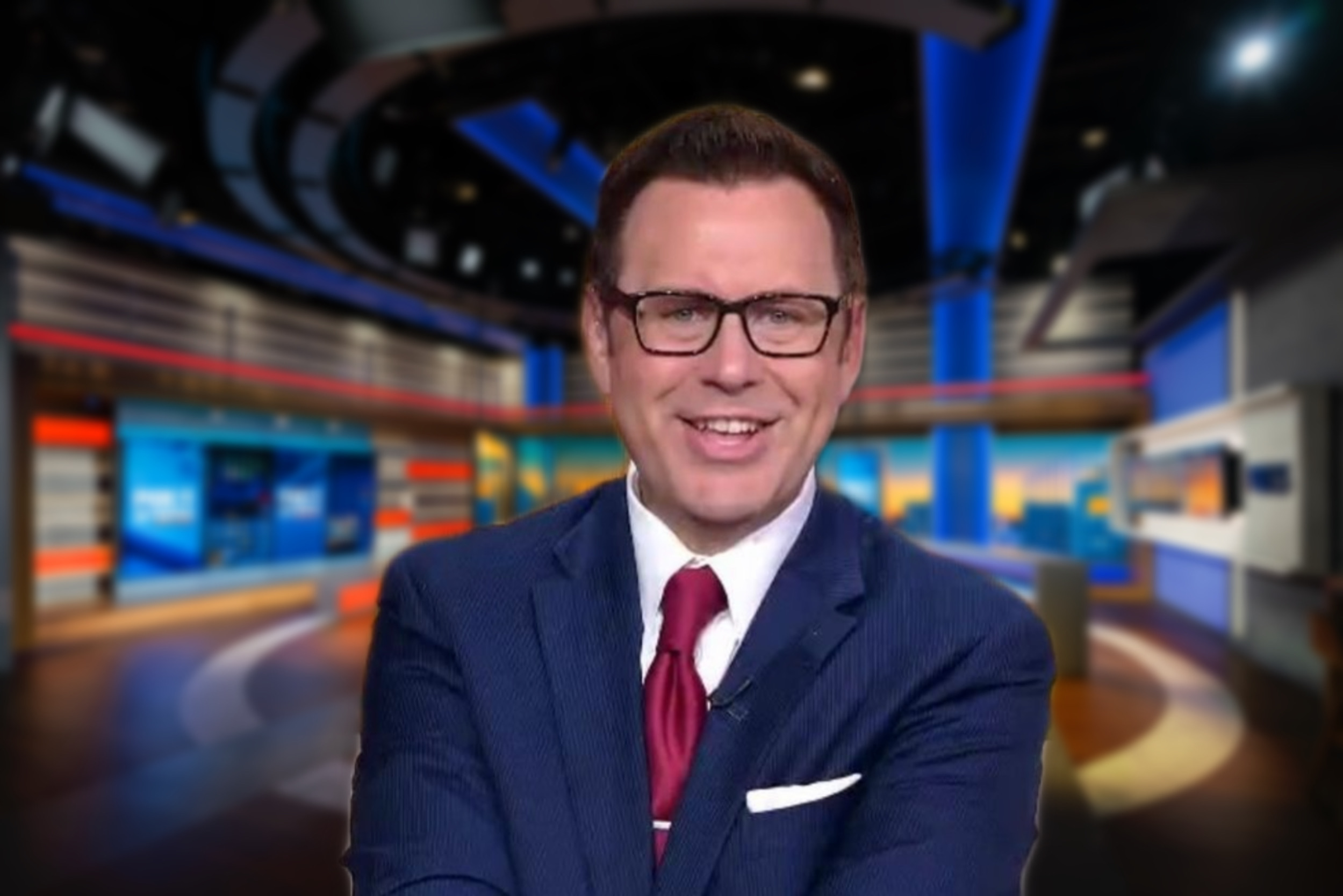

Tom Fitzgerald is a television news reporter, host and anchor for Fox 5 News WTTG in Washington D.C., which he joined in 2003.

== Personal and education ==
Fitzgerald grew up in Howell Township, New Jersey near the New Jersey Shore. He attended and graduated from Howell High School in 1984. Fitzgerald is a graduate of William Paterson University in Wayne, New Jersey, where he earned a Bachelor of Arts degree from the university's School of Arts & Communications in 1989.

== Career ==
Fitzgerald is an Anchor of "Fox 5 Morning Sunday", the Host of "Fox 5 On The Hill" and a Reporter at WTTG-TV in Washington D.C.

Fitzgerald's career began in 1985 at WBJB-FM, an NPR radio affiliate in Middletown Township, New Jersey as a newscaster and radio host. In 1990 he joined the staff of TV34 News as a reporter in Monmouth County, New Jersey. Over the course of six years he covered the New Jersey House of Representatives, political campaigns, organized crime investigations, and several major hurricanes.

In 1996, Fitzgerald was part of the original lineup of on-air correspondents for News 12 New Jersey. The network which is seen by more than 1.8 million homes, and was New Jersey's first 24-hour all-news television network. During his career with News 12 New Jersey, he reported, anchored and hosted the political talk show "Roundtable". Fitzgerald covered the September 11 attacks in 2001 traveling to the World Trade Center in New York, and at the Pentagon in Arlington, Virginia. He also covered several Republican and Democratic National Conventions, and served as the stations Jersey Shore Bureau Chief.

In 2003, Fitzgerald joined the staff of Fox Television's WTTG in Washington, D.C. Fitzgerald covers national political affairs for the Fox owned & operated station in the U.S. capital. Fitzgerald has covered the Obama administration, participating in several prime time presidential news conferences at the White House. In 2012, Fitzgerald attended all six hours of Supreme Court of the United States arguments over President Obama's Health Care Reform Law before the U.S. Supreme Court. In 2008, he was present for the US Supreme Court as it heard arguments before landmark decision striking down the Washington, D.C. gun ban. He reported several exclusive stories on how some airlines were failing to inspect their aircraft, resulting in hearings in the United States House of Representatives. He covered the 2016 Republican National Convention in Cleveland, Ohio and the 2016 Democratic National Convention in Philadelphia, Pennsylvania. He reported from the Inaugural stand at the U.S. Capitol Building for the swearing in of President Donald Trump on January 20, 2017. He also covered the Inauguration of President Joe Biden at the Capitol on January 20, 2021.

== Awards ==
Fitzgerald is a recipient of three Emmy Awards from the National Academy of Television Arts & Sciences. He has received five Emmy Award nominations. He was a contributor to several Edward R. Murrow Awards given out to broadcast news organizations by the Radio-Television News Directors Association.
