= Freehold Borough Schools =

School district in Monmouth County, New Jersey, US

Address
- 280 Park Avenue Freehold Borough, Monmouth County, New Jersey, 07728; United States
- Coordinates: 40.251999°N 74.280297°W

District information
- Grades: PreK-8
- Superintendent: Asia Michael
- Business administrator: Patrick Pisano
- Schools: 3

Students and staff
- Enrollment: 1,641 (as of 2022–23)
- Faculty: 162.0 FTEs
- Student–teacher ratio: 10.1:1

Other information
- District Factor Group: B
- Website: www.freeholdboro.k12.nj.us
Ind.	Per pupil	District spending	Rank (*)	K-8 average	%± vs. average
1A	Total Spending	$15,619	15	$18,891	−17.3%
1	Budgetary Cost	11,248	8	14,159	−20.6%
2	Classroom Instruction	6,963	6	8,659	−19.6%
6	Support Services	1,688	18	2,167	−22.1%
8	Administrative Cost	1,547	42	1,547	0.0%
10	Operations & Maintenance	934	2	1,612	−42.1%
13	Extracurricular Activities	78	32	104	−25.0%
16	Median Teacher Salary	53,080	6	61,136
Data from NJDoE 2014 Taxpayers' Guide to Education Spending. *Of K-8 districts with more than 750 students. Lowest spending=1; Highest=84

The Freehold Borough Schools are a community public school district that serves students in pre-kindergarten through eighth grade from Freehold Borough in Monmouth County, in the U.S. state of New Jersey.

As of the 2022–23 school year, the district, comprised of three schools, had an enrollment of 1,641 students and 162.0 classroom teachers (on an FTE basis), for a student–teacher ratio of 10.1:1.

The district is classified by the New Jersey Department of Education as being in District Factor Group "B", the second lowest of eight groupings. District Factor Groups organize districts statewide to allow comparison by common socioeconomic characteristics of the local districts. From lowest socioeconomic status to highest, the categories are A, B, CD, DE, FG, GH, I and J.

Students in public school for ninth through twelfth grades attend Freehold High School, as part of the Freehold Regional High School District or may apply to attend the district's specialized programs housed in other high schools in the FRHSD. As of the 2022–23 school year, the high school had an enrollment of 1,409 students and 97.8 classroom teachers (on an FTE basis), for a student–teacher ratio of 14.4:1. The Freehold Regional High School District also serves students from Colts Neck Township, Englishtown, Farmingdale, Freehold Township (which also has some students at Freehold Borough High School), Howell Township, Manalapan Township and Marlboro Township.

== History ==
In the era of de jure educational segregation in the United States, Freehold had a separate elementary school for black children; the school was still segregated in 1948.

The district was awarded a research grant in 2004 by the National Institute of Justice, a research branch of the United States Department of Justice. The $360,000 grant was entitled "Teacher-Parent Authentication Security System II: The Next Generation of Iris Recognition Technology in Schools" and was awarded to the Freehold Borough Board of Education.

== Schools ==
Schools in the district (with 2022–23 school enrollment data from the National Center for Education Statistics) are:

- Freehold Learning Center with 566 students in grades PreK–2
  - William Smith, principal
- Park Avenue Elementary School with 470 students in grades 3-5
  - Patrick Mulhern, principal
- Freehold Intermediate School with 519 students in grades 6-8
  - John Brovak, principal

== Administration ==
Core members of the district's administration are:

- Asia Michael, superintendent
- Patrick Pisano, business administrator / board secretary

== Board of education ==
The district's board of education, comprised of nine members, sets policy and oversees the fiscal and educational operation of the district through its administration. As a Type II school district, the board's trustees are elected directly by voters to serve three-year terms of office on a staggered basis, with three seats up for election each year held (since 2012) as part of the November general election. The board appoints a superintendent to oversee the district's day-to-day operations and a business administrator to supervise the business functions of the district. The board appoints a superintendent to oversee the district's day-to-day operations and a business administrator to supervise the business functions of the district.
