= Manalapan High School =

High school in Monmouth County, New Jersey, US

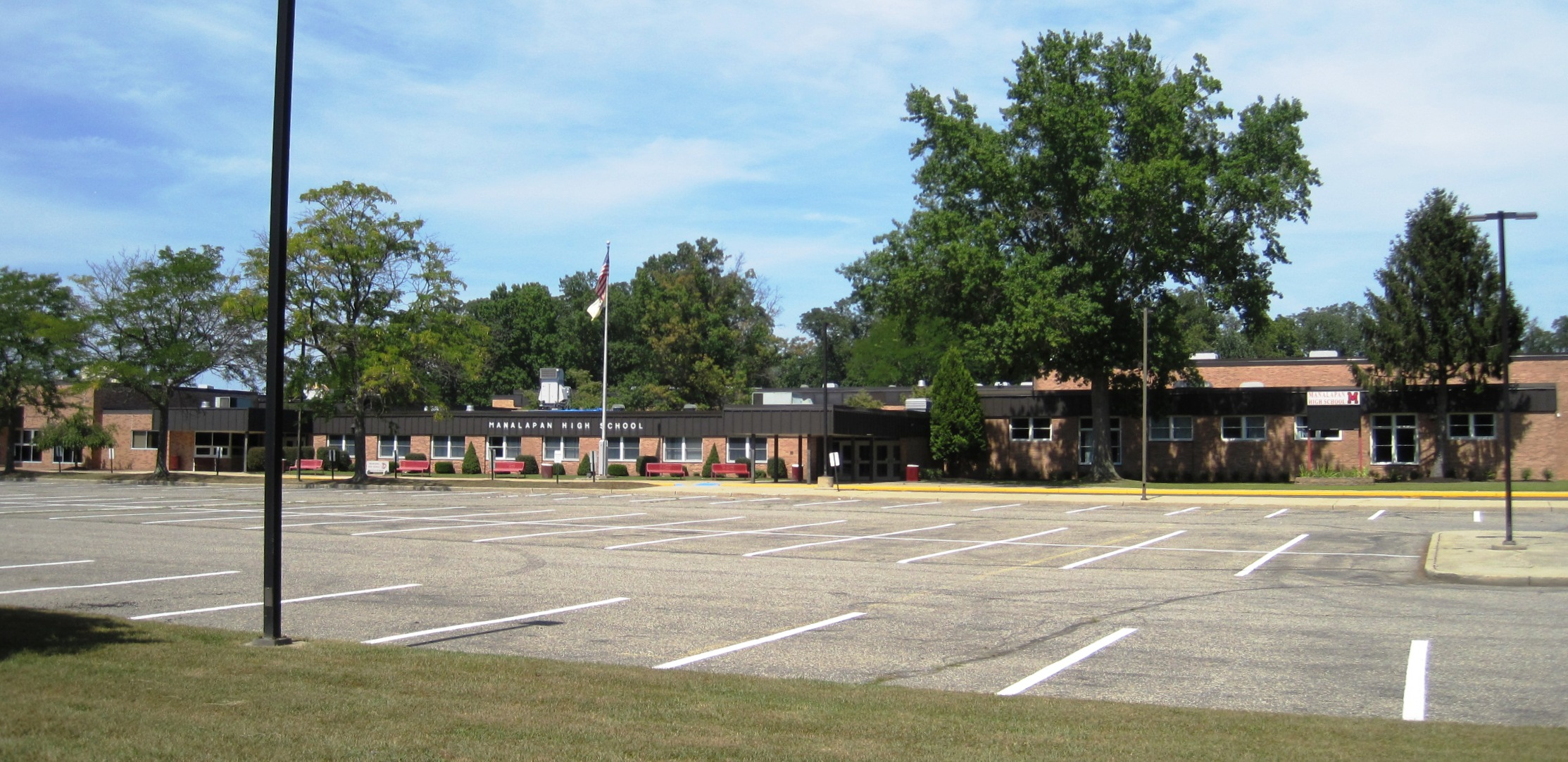

Location
- 20 Church Lane; Manalapan Township, Monmouth County, New Jersey 07726; United States; 40.2891°N 74.3360°W

Information
- Type: Public high school
- Motto: "Today's Students, Tomorrow's Leaders"
- Established: 1971
- School district: Freehold Regional High School District
- NCES School ID: 340561003802
- Principal: Shawn Currie
- Faculty: 113.0 FTEs
- Grades: 9-12
- Enrollment: 1,690 (as of 2024–25)
- Student to teacher ratio: 15.0:1
- Colors: Red white and navy blue
- Athletics conference: Shore Conference
- Team name: Braves
- Accreditation: Middle States Association of Colleges and Schools
- Website: manalapan.frhsd.com

Manalapan High School is a comprehensive four-year public high school located in Manalapan Township, in Monmouth County, in the U.S. state of New Jersey, operating as part of the Freehold Regional High School District. The school serves students in ninth through twelfth grades from all of Englishtown (which is the school's mailing address) and portions of Manalapan. The Freehold Regional High School District also serves students from Colts Neck Township, Farmingdale, Freehold Borough, Freehold Township, Howell Township, and Marlboro Township. The school has been accredited by the Middle States Association of Colleges and Schools Commission on Elementary and Secondary Schools since 1975; the school's accreditation expires in July 2025.

Manalapan High School is home to the Science/Engineering Specialized Learning Center, or S&E, which is a program for students with an interest in mathematical and scientific subjects. The program has anywhere between 10 and 40 students in each class and the curriculum consists of courses related to engineering, science and high level mathematics. The high school houses the Law Enforcement Public Safety Academy (LEPS), in which students undergo a course load learning about such fields as criminal justice, first responder procedures, evidence collection, first aid certifications, investigative procedures, civics, Homeland Security, fire science and safety, and emergency medical technicians. Manalapan also houses the Automotive Technical Academy, which helps students prepare for a career in the automotive service industry. Students learn about how engines and vehicles work, how to diagnose, and how to repair vehicles. Students will gain certifications through this program to set them up later in life. Students also learn how to use equipment such as scan tools.

As of the 2024–25 school year, the school had an enrollment of 1,690 students and 113.0 classroom teachers (on an FTE basis), for a student–teacher ratio of 15.0:1. There were 198 students (11.7% of enrollment) eligible for free lunch and 29 (1.7% of students) eligible for reduced-cost lunch.

== History ==
Freehold Township High School and Manalapan High School, the district's fourth and fifth facilities, were constructed with identical designs. Groundbreaking for both schools took place in August 1969 and the two schools opened in September 1971, having been completed at a combined cost of $10.4 million (equivalent to $82.7 million in 2025). Manalapan High School opened with an enrollment of 900 students from Englishtown and Manalapan Township, who had previously been assigned to attend Marlboro High School.

In 1985, Manalapan High School became the location of the Science & Engineering Magnet Program, the first magnet program established in the Freehold Regional High School District. The success of that program encouraged further programs in the district, with 11 others now operating district-wide.

== Awards, recognition and rankings ==
The school was the 93rd-ranked public high school in New Jersey out of 339 schools statewide in New Jersey Monthly magazine's September 2014 cover story on the state's "Top Public High Schools", using a new ranking methodology. The school had been ranked 152nd in the state of 328 schools in 2012, after being ranked 127th in 2010 out of 322 schools listed. The magazine ranked the school 125th in 2008 out of 316 schools. The school was also ranked 125th in the magazine's September 2006 issue, which surveyed 316 schools across the state.

Schooldigger.com ranked the school tied for 61st out of 381 public high schools statewide in its 2011 rankings (a decrease of 7 positions from the 2010 ranking) which were based on the combined percentage of students classified as proficient or above proficient on the mathematics (91.6%) and language arts literacy (96.2%) components of the High School Proficiency Assessment (HSPA).

In 2009, of the 460 students who graduated, 97% went on to continue their education at two- or four-year colleges or universities. Also there are others who graduated and are now attending trade or technical schools. The Class of 2009 also produced 11 commended students, 4 semi-finalists and 1 complete finalist in the National Merit Scholarship Program, as well as 42 Edward J. Bloustein Distinguished Scholars.

== Athletics ==
The Manalapan High School Braves compete in Division A North of the Shore Conference, an athletic conference comprised of public and private high schools in Monmouth and Ocean counties along the Jersey Shore. The league operates under the jurisdiction of the New Jersey State Interscholastic Athletic Association. With 1,417 students in grades 10-12, the school was classified by the NJSIAA for the 2019–20 school year as Group IV for most athletic competition purposes, which included schools with an enrollment of 1,060 to 5,049 students in that grade range. The school was classified by the NJSIAA as Group IV South for football for 2024–2026, which included schools with 890 to 1,298 students.

The girls' spring track team was the Group II state champion in 1975.

The boys' cross country running team won the Group III state championship in 1979 and the Group IV title in 2025.

The boys' wrestling team won the Central Jersey Group IV state sectional championship in 1986, 1991 and 1992, and won the Central Jersey Group V title in 2020.

The boys' basketball team won the Central Jersey Group IV state sectional championship in 1988.

The boys' bowling team were the winners of the 2006 New Jersey State Interscholastic Athletic Association state championship. The Brave's score of 2,840 defeated runner-up Woodbridge High School by a margin of ten pins at Carolier Lanes.

In 2007, the boys' soccer team won the Central Jersey Group IV state sectional championship with a 1–0 win over Howell High School in the tournament final. The team moved on to share the Group IV state championship with a 1–1 tie against Clifton High School.

In 2008, Robby Andrews won the New Jersey State Interscholastic Athletic Association Meet of Champions in the 800m run. He followed this up with the 1600m Group IV state championship in the 1600m run. Additionally he placed second in both the Millrose Games and Penn Relays, participating in the mile run on both occasions. In 2009, Robby Andrews won the Meet of Champions in the 800m run, set two national records in the 1000m and 800m runs, won the Millrose Games and won two national championships.

The baseball team won the Group IV state championship in 2011 (defeating Westfield High School in the tournament final) and 2012 (vs. Hillsborough High School). The 2011 baseball team finished the season with a record of 29-3 and won the Group IV state championship with a 29–14 victory against Westfield in a game in which the team pounded out 32 hits on way to the program's first state title.

The 2014 football team won the Central Jersey Group V state sectional title with a 21-7 victory against South Brunswick High School in the championship game played at Rutgers University's High Point Solutions Stadium.

The school has a longstanding athletic rivalry with Marlboro High School, another school in the Freehold Regional High School District, which includes a longstanding Thanksgiving Day football matchup between the teams. A more recent rivalry with Freehold Township High School has also developed.

== In popular culture ==
Manalapan High was featured on MTV's High School Stories, NBC's Today in a segment with alumnus Dylan Dreyer, and on TruTV's The Principal's Office.

== Administration ==
The school's principal is Shawn Currie. The school's administration includes three assistant principals.

== Other high schools in the district ==
Attendance at each of the district's high schools is based on where the student lives in relation to the district's high schools. While many students attend the school in their hometown, others attend a school located outside their own municipality. In order to balance enrollment, district lines are redrawn for the six schools to address issues with overcrowding and spending in regards to transportation. The other five schools in the district (with 2024–25 enrollment data from the National Center for Education Statistics) with their attendance zones for incoming students are:

- Colts Neck High School with 1,430 students from Colts Neck Township (all), Howell (part) and Marlboro (part)
- Freehold High School with 1,376 students from Freehold (all) and Freehold Township (part)
- Freehold Township High School with 1,813 students from Freehold Township (part), Howell (part), Manalapan (part)
- Howell High School with 1,775 students from Farmingdale (all) and Howell (part)
- Marlboro High School with 1,700 students from Marlboro (part)

== Notable alumni ==
- Robby Andrews (born 1991, class of 2009), middle distance runner, who specializes in the 800 and 1500 meters.
- Jason Bergmann (born 1981), pitcher who played in Major League Baseball for the Washington Nationals
- Saeed Blacknall (born 1996), wide receiver for the Vegas Vipers
- Kevin Boyle (born 1992), former professional ice hockey goaltender who played in the NHL for the Anaheim Ducks
- Lou Brutus (born 1962), radio host, musician and photographer
- David DeJesus (born 1979, class of 1997), MLB outfielder for the Tampa Bay Rays
- Dylan Dreyer (born 1981, class of 1999), television meteorologist working for NBC News
- Val Emmich (born 1979), singer, songwriter and actor
- Lou Esposito (born 1977/1978, class of 1996), American football coach and former player who has been the defensive coordinator for the Western Michigan Broncos football team
- Anthony Firkser (born 1995), tight end for the New England Patriots
- Richard Fleischman (born 1963, class of 1981), violist, pedagogue and conductor
- Jay Glazer (born 1969), television personality and sports reporter
- Kyle Mullen (d. 2022, class of 2015) former captain of the Yale Bulldogs football team who enlisted in the United States Navy after college and died following the "Hell Week" portion of Navy SEAL training
- Jack Perri (born 1975), head men's basketball coach at Southern New Hampshire University
- Daniel Reich (class of 2004), is an American entrepreneur, investor and philanthropist.
- Michael "The Situation" Sorrentino (born 1982, class of 1999), television personality who has appeared on MTV's Jersey Shore
- Rashod Swinger (born 1974), former defensive lineman who played in the NFL for the Arizona Cardinals
- Jade Yorker (born 1985), actor
