= Freehold Township High School =

High school in Monmouth County, New Jersey, US

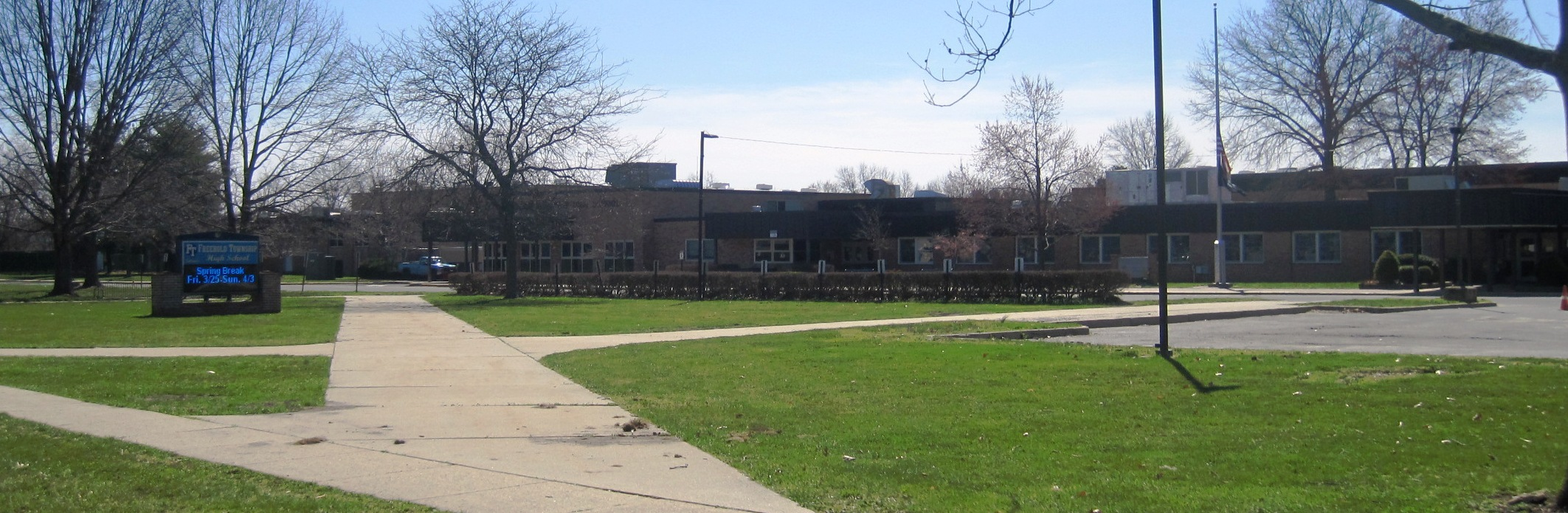
- Front of the school

Location
- 281 Elton-Adelphia Road (CR 524); Freehold Township, Monmouth County, New Jersey 07728; United States; 40.220957°N 74.281231°W

Information
- Type: Public high school
- Established: 1972
- School district: Freehold Regional High School District
- NCES School ID: 340561003798
- Principal: Alicia K. Scelso
- Faculty: 122.8 FTEs
- Grades: 9-12
- Enrollment: 1,813 (as of 2024–25)
- Student to teacher ratio: 14.8:1
- Colors: Columbia blue navy blue white
- Athletics conference: Shore Conference
- Team name: Patriots
- Accreditation: Middle States Association of Colleges and Schools
- Newspaper: Patriot Press
- Yearbook: Heritage
- Website: freeholdtwp.frhsd.com

Freehold Township High School is a four-year comprehensive public high school located in Freehold Township, in Monmouth County, in the U.S. state of New Jersey, and is part of the Freehold Regional High School District. The school serves students from portions of Freehold Township, and from parts of both Howell Township and Manalapan Township. The school has been accredited by the Middle States Association of Colleges and Schools Commission on Elementary and Secondary Schools since 1976; the school's accreditation status extends to July 2025.

As of the 2024–25 school year, the school had an enrollment of 1,813 students and 122.8 classroom teachers (on an FTE basis), for a student–teacher ratio of 14.8:1. There were 315 students (17.4% of enrollment) eligible for free lunch and 38 (2.1% of students) eligible for reduced-cost lunch.

== History ==
Freehold Township High School and Manalapan High School, the district's fourth and fifth facilities, were constructed with identical designs. Groundbreaking for both schools took place in August 1969 and the two schools opened in September 1971, having been completed at a combined cost of $10.4 million (equivalent to $82.7 million in 2025). Freehold High School was closed for a $300,000 renovation project during the 1971–72 school year, during which it operated with 1,600 students using the new building that had been completed for Freehold Township High School, which did not open as an independent school until September 1972, after the repair work at Freehold High School was completed.

== Awards, recognition and rankings ==
The school was the 66th-ranked public high school in New Jersey out of 339 schools statewide in New Jersey Monthly magazine's September 2014 cover story on the state's "Top Public High Schools", using a new ranking methodology. The school had been ranked 199th in the state of 328 schools in 2012, after being ranked 212th in 2010 out of 322 schools listed. The magazine ranked the school 122nd in 2008 out of 316 schools. The school was ranked 144th in the magazine's September 2006 issue, which surveyed 316 schools across the state. Schooldigger.com ranked the school tied for 115th out of 381 public high schools statewide in its 2011 rankings (a decrease of 32 positions from the 2010 ranking) which were based on the combined percentage of students classified as proficient or above proficient on the mathematics (85.9%) and language arts literacy (95.7%) components of the High School Proficiency Assessment (HSPA).

In its 2021 rankings, U.S. News & World Report ranked the school 138th in New Jersey, 348th in the New York metropolitan area and 3628th nationwide, as well as fourth among the six high schools in the district. Schools are ranked on their performance on state-required tests, graduation rates and how well they prepare students for college.

== Athletics ==
The Freehold Township High School Patriots compete in Division A North of the Shore Conference, an athletic conference comprised of public and private high schools in Monmouth and Ocean counties along the Jersey Shore. The league operates under the jurisdiction of the New Jersey State Interscholastic Athletic Association (NJSIAA). With 1,538 students in grades 10–12, the school was classified by the NJSIAA for the 2019–20 school year as Group IV for most athletic competition purposes, which included schools with an enrollment of 1,060 to 5,049 students in that grade range. The school was classified by the NJSIAA as Group V South for football for 2024–2026, which included schools with 1,333 to 2,324 students.

The boys' soccer team finished the season with a 22–1–1 record and was the Group IV co-champion in 1982 together with Kearny High School, after a 1–1 tie in the championship game.

The baseball team won the Group III state championship in 1986, defeating Indian Hills High School by a score of 6–0 in the tournament final played at Princeton University.

The field hockey team won the Central Jersey Group IV state sectional championships in 2009, 2011, 2012 and 2014–2016.

The girls' soccer team was Group IV co-champion in 2015 and 2017 with Ridge High School both years. A scoreless tie after double overtime with Ridge gave the 2015 team a share of the Group IV title and a 20–4–2 record for the season. The 2017 team finished the season with a 23–1–1 record and was co-champion with Ridge High School after the Group IV title game ended in a scoreless tie after regulation and two overtime periods.

The boys' bowling team won the Group IV state championship in 2015.

The girls' gymnastics team was the team state champion in 2017, 2018 and 2019. The three state titles are tied for third-most in New Jersey.

The 2019 girls' bowling team won the Group III state championship and was the runner-up in the Tournament of Champions to Toms River High School North.

== Magnet programs ==
FTHS consists of two magnet programs, the Animal Botanical Science Academy and the Global Studies Learning Center formerly known as the International Studies (IS) and Contemporary Global Issues (CGI) program: Both learning centers offer program-exclusive coursework to students, which are taken in addition to other available courses. To be eligible for these classes, students must enter a rigorous district wide examination during a student's eighth grade year where top candidates are allowed into the program. The examination includes an application, essays, letters of recommendation, and a standardized test. Typically, students who have high grades and test scores are admitted. You can also be wailisted into the program, and move up in the waitlist based upon the acceptance and/or denial of students into the programs into another FRHSD program.

- Students who enroll in the program are automatically members of the National FFA Organization (FFA)

Courses:

- Freshman year: Agribiology
- Sophomore year: Floral and Landscape Design and Animal Science
- Junior year: Honors Agricultural Leadership I
- Senior year: Honors Agricultural Leadership II and Animal Science
  - Classes incorporate FFA activities such as planning events or studying for competitions also known as Career Development Events. FFA focuses on agricultural education as well as positive personal development and career success.

Global Studies (GS) The Global Studies courses allow students to become more knowledgeable in current and past world manners, how these concurrent manners influence how people make decisions, and why they make them. Among the below studies, primarily that of the arts, literature, geography, infrastructure and history, students can help build a refined understanding of current global situations.

Courses:

- Freshman year: AP Human Geography (1/2 year), Honors International Diplomacy (1/2 year), Honors World Art Studio, and Honors World Literature and the Writers Workshop
- Sophomore year: Honors United States in the World, AP Comparative Government and Politics, and Honors American Literature and the Research Workshop
- Junior year: Honors International Law & Human Rights (1/2 year course), Regional Studies I: Latin America & the Caribbean (1/2 year), and AP US History
- Senior year: Honors Senior Seminar, AP Microeconomics (1/2 year), and Regional Studies II: Asia & Africa (1/2 year)

== Current student body ==
Statistics are as of the 2018-2019 School Year

Subset	Number of students	Percent
All	1,920	100%
White	1,592	74.5%
African American	103	5.0%
Asian	122	4.8%
Hispanic	179	7.1%
American Indian	5	0.2%
Two or More Races	9	0.4%
Male	962	46.4%
Female	1,107	53.5%

== Administration ==
The school's principal is Alicia K. Scelso. Her core administration team includes three assistant principals.

== Notable alumni ==
- Brad Brach (born 1986), former professional baseball pitcher
- Brian Brikowski (born 1989), American football defensive end and linebacker who played for the Montreal Alouettes of the Canadian Football League
- Alyssa Campanella (born 1990), Miss New Jersey Teen USA 2007, 1st runner up at Miss Teen USA 2007 and Miss USA 2011
- Dave Cantin (born 1979), entrepreneur
- Joann Downey (born 1966), politician who represents the 11th Legislative District in the New Jersey General Assembly
- Robert Griswold (born 1996, class of 2015), bronze medalist in swimming for the United States team at the 2016 Paralympic Games
- Val Majewski (born 1981), center fielder with the Houston Astros
- Caroline O'Connor (Class of 1995), President of a Major League Baseball franchise, Miami Marlins
- Kal Penn (born 1977), actor
- Peter Schrager (born 1982), sportscaster on Fox Sports and NFL Network
- Ryan Spadola (born 1991), wide receiver who has played in the NFL for the Miami Dolphins and New York Jets
- Emmanuel Ubilla (born 1986), professional basketball player for Kaposvári KK of the Hungarian League

== Other high schools in the district ==
Attendance at each of the district's high schools is based on where the student lives in relation to the district's high schools. While many students attend the school in their hometown, others attend a school located outside their own municipality. In order to balance enrollment, district lines are redrawn for the six schools to address issues with overcrowding and spending in regards to transportation. The other five schools in the district (with 2024–25 enrollment data from the National Center for Education Statistics) with their attendance zones for incoming students are:

- Colts Neck High School with 1,430 students from Colts Neck Township (all), Howell (part) and Marlboro (part)
- Freehold High School with 1,376 students from Freehold (all) and Freehold Township (part)
- Howell High School with 1,775 students from Farmingdale (all) and Howell (part)
- Manalapan High School with 1,690 students from Englishtown (all) and Manalapan (part)
- Marlboro High School with 1,700 students from Marlboro (part)
