= Shore Conference =

High school athletic conference in New Jersey, USA

- Conference: NJSIAA
- Founded: 1936
- Commissioner: Harry Chebookjian (President, 2023–24)
- No. of teams: 46
- Headquarters: New Jersey, United States
- Region: Monmouth and Ocean counties
- Official website: theshoreconference.com

The Shore Conference is an athletic conference of private and public high schools in the U.S. state of New Jersey, centered at the Northern Jersey Shore. All schools in this conference are located within Monmouth County and Ocean County. The Shore Conference is broken up into six classes based on school size and location. Classes change every two years based upon school size. The league operates under the jurisdiction of the New Jersey State Interscholastic Athletic Association (NJSIAA).

== History ==
The Shore Conference was founded in February 1936 as an athletic league for Group II public high schools in Monmouth and Ocean counties, New Jersey. The initiative was led by Roy W. H. Maurer, athletic director at Freehold High School, who became its first president. Nine of the eleven eligible schools initially joined, excluding Matawan and Leonardo.

The original focus was on competition in football, basketball, baseball, and track. Governance was organized with elected officers and an Executive Council, which rotated annually.

In December 1940, the conference capped its membership at twelve schools and rejected applications from outside districts, including Sayreville High School. Notably, Red Bank Catholic's applications for membership were repeatedly denied throughout the 1940s and 1950s due to a constitutional rule that only public schools could be admitted.

By the 1950s, the conference adopted divisional play and scheduling templates, shifting from a single league table to Group I and Group II divisions, later renamed Division A and B. Titles were awarded based on point systems or win-loss percentages, depending on the sport.

New sports such as cross country (1956), soccer (unofficially in 1961, officially in 1962), wrestling (1962), and tennis (1964) were gradually added to the athletic calendar.

Membership expanded steadily from the original eleven to over two dozen by the early 1960s. Realignments were frequent and often driven by changing school enrollments, resulting in the adoption of a four-division system (A, B, C, D) by 1969 to better accommodate growth and facilitate competitive balance.

A salaried Executive Secretary position was introduced in 1963, reflecting the increasing administrative complexity of managing the conference’s schedules and regulations.

As of the 2020s, the Shore Conference remains a leading interscholastic athletic organization in New Jersey, known for its competitiveness across multiple sports and its deep ties to local communities.

== Realignment ==
The Shore Conference periodically undergoes divisional realignment to reflect changes in school enrollment, athletic competitiveness, and geographic considerations. These realignments are generally implemented on a biennial basis and are overseen by the Executive Board and scheduling coordinators.

=== Historical Background ===
Founded in 1936, the Shore Conference initially consisted of a single division for Group II public schools in Monmouth and Ocean counties. As school populations grew and new schools were established, the conference expanded and adopted a multi-division structure. By the late 1950s, divisions were commonly grouped by school size (Groups I–IV), and later evolved into "A" and "B" divisions to improve parity and scheduling logistics.

Key realignments included:

- 1962–1963: The conference adopted a two-division realignment—A and B Divisions—based on a vote in April 1960.
- Late 1960s: Expansion to A, B, C, and D divisions based on enrollment bands and regional balancing.
- 1980s–2000s: Frequent reevaluation of divisional assignments to maintain competitive balance.
- 2010s–present: Sport-specific alignments, especially for football, have become more common through collaboration with the Shore Football Coaches Foundation and NJSIAA.

=== 2024–2026 Alignment ===
For the 2024–2025 and 2025–2026 school years, the Shore Conference is organized into six primary divisions: A North, A Central, A South, B North, B Central, and B South. Each division is composed based on geography and school size, with a mix of public and non-public institutions. Some schools compete in different classifications depending on the sport (e.g., general athletics vs. football).

Divisional vice presidents are appointed for each section to assist with coordination and sportsmanship initiatives:

- A North – Adam Brusotti (Freehold Township)
- A Central – John DeGenito (Raritan)
- A South – Ed Sarluca (Brick Memorial)
- B North – Philip Tyburczy (Matawan)
- B Central – Rich Laduca (Point Pleasant Beach)
- B South – John Germano (Barnegat)

=== Recent Developments ===
In 2024, the Shore Conference also adopted a revised football-only alignment that expanded to eight divisions. This was intended to enhance competitive balance and reduce travel, reflecting the unique needs of football programs across the region.

=== Factors Driving Realignment ===
Realignment decisions take into account:

- NJSIAA enrollment data for grades 10–12
- Geographic proximity to reduce travel
- Historical athletic performance to promote equity
- Public vs. non-public school distinctions
- Sport-specific competitive and logistical needs

These adjustments are typically reviewed by the conference’s scheduling team and approved by the Executive Board in consultation with school officials.

== Sports ==
The Shore Conference oversees interscholastic athletic competition in a variety of sports sanctioned by the New Jersey State Interscholastic Athletic Association (NJSIAA). As a regional high school athletics league serving Monmouth and Ocean counties, it provides structured divisions, postseason tournaments, and conference recognition in the following sports.

=== Fall Sports ===
- Cross Country (Boys & Girls)
- Field Hockey (Girls)
- Football
- Gymnastics (Girls)
- Soccer (Boys & Girls)
- Tennis (Girls)
- Volleyball (Girls)

=== Winter Sports ===
- Basketball (Boys & Girls)
- Bowling (Boys & Girls)
- Fencing (Boys & Girls)
- Ice Hockey (co-op teams permitted)
- Indoor Track & Field (Boys & Girls)
- Swimming (Boys & Girls)
- Wrestling (Boys & Girls)

=== Spring Sports ===
- Baseball (Boys)
- Golf (Boys & Girls)
- Lacrosse (Boys & Girls)
- Softball (Girls)
- Tennis (Boys)
- Track & Field (Boys & Girls)
- Volleyball (Boys)

Each sport typically includes divisional play, Shore Conference tournaments, and opportunities to qualify for NJSIAA state-level competition. Some sports, such as wrestling and track, also feature Shore Conference championship meets and individual honors.

The conference also sponsors seasonal tournaments and special recognition awards, including All-Conference and All-Division team selections, across various venues in Monmouth and Ocean counties.

== Member schools ==
Member schools, broken down by division for 2024–2025 and 2025–2026, are:

Shore Conference – Division A North
School name	NJSIAA Classification	Location	Enrollment (2023–24)	Mascot	School Colors
Christian Brothers Academy	Non-Public A	Lincroft, NJ	Not publicly listed	Colts	Navy Blue, White
Colts Neck High School	Group III (General), Group IV South (Football)	Colts Neck, NJ	1,413	Cougars	Navy Blue, Green, Silver
Freehold Township High School	Group IV (General), Group V South (Football)	Freehold Township, NJ	1,902	Patriots	Columbia Blue, Navy Blue, White
Howell High School	Group IV (General), Group V South (Football)	Farmingdale, NJ	1,905	Rebels	Navy Blue, Silver
Long Branch High School	Group IV	Long Branch, NJ	Not publicly listed	Green Wave	Green, White
Manalapan High School	Group IV (General), Group IV South (Football)	Englishtown, NJ	1,740	Braves	Red, White, Navy Blue
Marlboro High School	Group IV (General), Group IV South (Football)	Marlboro, NJ	1,742	Mustangs	Navy Blue, Gold
Red Bank Regional High School	Group III (General), Group IV South (Football)	Little Silver, NJ	1,297	Buccaneers	Maroon, Gray

Shore Conference – Division A Central
School name	NJSIAA Classification	Location	Enrollment (2023–24)	Mascot	School Colors
Manasquan High School	Group II	Manasquan, NJ	945	Warriors	Navy Blue, Gray
Monmouth Regional High School	Group II	Tinton Falls, NJ	902	Falcons	Black, Gold
Raritan High School	Group II (General), Group II South (Football)	Hazlet, NJ	698	Rockets	Green, White
Red Bank Catholic High School	Non-Public A (General), Non-Public B (Football)	Red Bank, NJ	915	Caseys	Forest Green, Gold
Rumson-Fair Haven Regional High School	Group II	Rumson, NJ	724	Bulldogs	Purple, White
Shore Regional High School	Group I	West Long Branch, NJ	558	Blue Devils	Navy Blue, White
Trinity Hall	Non-Public B	Tinton Falls, NJ	201	Monarchs	Orange, Navy Blue
Wall High School	Group III (General), Group II South (Football)	Wall Township, NJ	912	Crimson Knights	Crimson, White, Blue

Shore Conference – Division A South
School name	NJSIAA Classification	Location	Enrollment (2023–24)	Mascot	School Colors
Brick Memorial High School	Group IV (General), Group IV South (Football)	Brick Township, NJ	1,297	Mustangs	Forest Green, Gold, White
Brick Township High School	Group III (General), Group III South (Football)	Brick Township, NJ	1,211	Green Dragons	Green, White
Central Regional High School	Group III (General), Group III South (Football)	Bayville, NJ	1,562	Golden Eagles	Garnet, Gold
Jackson Memorial High School	Group IV (General), Group IV South (Football)	Jackson Township, NJ	1,496	Jaguars	Red, Black
Southern Regional High School	Group IV (General), Group V South (Football)	Manahawkin, NJ	1,442	Rams	Gold, Black
Toms River High School East	Group III (General), Group IV South (Football)	Toms River, NJ	1,300	Raiders	Black, White
Toms River High School North	Group IV (General), Group V South (Football)	Toms River, NJ	1,962	Mariners	Navy Blue, Gold
Toms River High School South	Group III (General), Group IV South (Football)	Toms River, NJ	1,371	Indians	Maroon, White

Shore Conference – Division B North
School name	NJSIAA Classification	Location	Enrollment (2023–24)	Mascot	School Colors
Holmdel High School	Group II	Holmdel, NJ	Not publicly listed	Hornets	Navy Blue, White
Freehold High School	Group III (General), Group IV South (Football)	Freehold Borough, NJ	1,407	Colonials	Navy Blue, Old Gold
Matawan Regional High School	Group III (General), Group III South (Football)	Aberdeen Township, NJ	1,154	Huskies	Maroon, Steel Gray
Middletown High School North	Group III (General), Group IV South (Football)	Middletown Township, NJ	1,322	Lions	Orange, Black
Middletown High School South	Group IV (General), Group IV South (Football)	Middletown Township, NJ	1,425	Eagles	Navy Blue, Silver
Neptune High School	Group III (General), Group III South (Football)	Neptune Township, NJ	1,102	Scarlet Fliers	Red, Black
Ocean Township High School	Group III (General), Group III South (Football)	Oakhurst, NJ	Not publicly listed	Spartans	Red, White
St. John Vianney High School	Non-Public A	Holmdel Township, NJ	979	Lancers	Black, Gold, White

Shore Conference – Division B Central
School name	NJSIAA Classification	Location	Enrollment (2023–24)	Mascot	School Colors
Asbury Park High School	Group I (General), Group I South (Football)	Asbury Park, NJ	370	Bishops	Columbia Blue, Black
Henry Hudson Regional High School	Group I	Highlands, NJ	302	Admirals	Navy Blue, White
Keansburg High School	Group I (General), Group I South (Football)	Keansburg, NJ	282	Titans	Purple, White
Keyport High School	Group I	Keyport, NJ	Not publicly listed	Red Raiders	Red, White
New Egypt High School	Group I (General), Group I South (Football)	New Egypt, NJ	317	Warriors	Navy Blue, Vegas Gold
Point Pleasant Beach High School	Group I (General), Group I South (Football)	Point Pleasant Beach, NJ	326	Garnet Gulls	Garnet, White
Ranney School	Non-Public B	Tinton Falls, NJ	686	Panthers	Navy Blue, White
St. Rose High School	Non-Public B	Belmar, NJ	382	Purple Roses	Purple, Gold

Shore Conference – Division B South
School name	NJSIAA Classification	Location	Enrollment (2023–24)	Mascot	School Colors
Barnegat High School	Group III (General), Group III South (Football)	Barnegat, NJ	997	Bengals	Orange, Black, White
Donovan Catholic High School	Non-Public A	Toms River, NJ	641	Griffins	Royal Blue, White
Jackson Liberty High School	Group III (General), Group IV South (Football)	Jackson Township, NJ	1,076	Lions	Red, Silver, Navy Blue
Lacey Township High School	Group III (General), Group IV South (Football)	Lanoka Harbor, NJ	1,186	Lions	Navy Blue, Gray, Cardinal
Lakewood High School	Group III (General), Group III South (Football)	Lakewood, NJ	1,330	Piners	Blue, White
Manchester Township High School	Group III (General), Group III South (Football)	Manchester Township, NJ	1,100	Hawks	Royal Blue, Gold
Pinelands Regional High School	Group III (General), Group III South (Football)	Tuckerton, NJ	1,077	Wildcats	Forest Green, Vegas Gold
Point Pleasant Borough High School	Group II (General), Group II South (Football)	Point Pleasant, NJ	886	Panthers	Black, Gold

== Rivalries ==
The Shore Conference is home to some of New Jersey’s most storied high school sports rivalries, particularly in football. These matchups are often rooted in geographic proximity, shared history, and community pride, with many dating back decades and drawing significant local attention.

=== Notable Rivalries ===
- Red Bank Catholic vs. Rumson-Fair Haven: A rivalry that often determines divisional championships in football and baseball. Their football meetings, especially in state playoff settings, have developed into must-see matchups across Monmouth County.
- Toms River North vs. Toms River South: An intra-town rivalry with decades of tradition, particularly in football and baseball. Their annual football game is one of the most highly anticipated on the Shore Conference calendar.
- Manasquan vs. Wall: A fierce rivalry in multiple sports, including football, basketball, and lacrosse. The Thanksgiving football matchup between these schools is one of the oldest and most competitive holiday games in the state.
- Middletown North vs. Middletown South: Known as the "Middletown Madness" in basketball and a major event in football, this rivalry is fueled by proximity, alumni pride, and consistent competition across all sports.
- Long Branch vs. Red Bank: A rivalry dating back over 100 years in football, regarded as one of the oldest public school matchups in New Jersey. It retains major historical and cultural significance.
- Keyport vs. Keansburg: A small-school rivalry characterized by passionate local support and long-standing pride in gridiron and hardwood contests.
- Point Pleasant Boro vs. Point Pleasant Beach: Although the schools are in different NJSIAA groups, their occasional contests in basketball and wrestling draw large community turnouts.

These rivalries often serve as cultural and athletic cornerstones for their respective schools, reinforcing community identity and school spirit.

== Tournaments ==
The Shore Conference organizes postseason tournaments across various sports to determine conference champions prior to the commencement of the NJSIAA state playoffs. These tournaments are significant regional events that highlight the competitive spirit of schools within Monmouth and Ocean counties.

=== Structure and Format ===
Tournament structures differ by sport:

- Team sports such as basketball, soccer, baseball, and softball typically feature single-elimination brackets.
- Individual sports like wrestling and swimming conduct championship meets or bracketed competitions.
- Seeding is generally based on regular-season performance, power points, and divisional standings.

For example, the 2025 Shore Conference Boys' Basketball Tournament included a 20-team bracket with seeding based on NJSIAA power points. The tournament featured opening rounds, quarterfinals, semifinals, and a championship game hosted at central venues within the region.

=== Relationship to NJSIAA State Playoffs ===
Shore Conference tournaments are distinct from NJSIAA state playoffs but serve as a precursor:

- They are completed before the NJSIAA tournaments begin, allowing teams to compete for both conference and state titles.
- Performance in Shore Conference tournaments does not directly influence NJSIAA playoff qualification, which is based on power points, strength of schedule, and win-loss records.
- Winning a Shore Conference tournament is considered a prestigious achievement within the region, complementing the pursuit of state championships.

For instance, during the 2025 baseball season, 39 of the 47 Shore Conference teams qualified for the NJSIAA Baseball Tournament, reflecting the overall strength of the league.

=== Additional County-Level Tournaments ===
In addition to Shore Conference championships, schools may also compete in county-specific tournaments:

- The Monmouth County Baseball Tournament is a longstanding tradition that runs parallel to the Shore Conference schedule, offering additional opportunities for competition and local bragging rights.
- Monmouth and Ocean counties have also hosted similar tournaments in other sports such as boys' and girls' soccer, basketball, and wrestling. Participation varies by year and scheduling availability.

=== Notable Events ===
- The Shore Conference Wrestling Tournament features a 16-man bracket, with top wrestlers selected using a points system based on prestige and performance. The 2025 tournament was held over two days at Lakewood High School.
- The Shore Conference Ice Hockey Tournament follows NFHS rules, with selected teams seeded after a performance-based cutoff date. The 2025 tournament was coordinated by the Brick Township Athletic Department.

== Accomplishments ==
In 2014, the Shore Conference swept all four sectional titles in Central Jersey in football. The Champions are:

- CJG1; Shore Regional High School
- CJG2: Rumson-Fair Haven Regional High School
- CJG3: Matawan Regional High School
- CJG4: Jackson Memorial High School
- CJG5: Manalapan High School

Also Red Bank Catholic High School won their first sectional championship in 38 years against Delbarton.
