= Science/Engineering Specialized Learning Center =

Magnet high school in New Jersey, United States

Coordinates: 40.287875°N 74.335747°W

Science & Engineering Magnet Program at Manalapan High School

Information
- Type: Public magnet high school
- Established: 1985
- School district: Freehold Regional High School District
- Grades: 9-12
- Enrollment: 100-200
- ROR ID: 03ewtwj48
- Website: https://sites.google.com/frhsd.com/seopenhouse/home

The Science/Engineering Specialized Learning Center, S&E or SnE, is a public high school magnet program housed within Manalapan High School, located in Englishtown, in Monmouth County, New Jersey, United States. The program, started in 1985, is designed for students with an interest in focusing on mathematical and scientific subjects.

The program has had 10 to 60 students in each class, which has recently been changed to a maximum of 60 per class, and the curriculum consists largely of courses related to engineering, science, and high level mathematics. The program has many Advanced Placement (AP) courses, which can provide college credit with appropriate scores (3, 4, or 5). A member of the Freehold Regional High School District, the learning center serves no more than 240 students at any time.

Applicants, drawn from the communities in the Freehold Regional High School District, take an entrance exam in the eighth grade that tests their abilities in mathematics and English. In addition, there is also a personal statement portion of the application which allows students to write an essay on why they wish to go to the school as well as telling of their extracurricular activities or awards. Parents have been known to move into the district just so their children may have a chance to be accepted into S&E.

The program has knowledgeable and helpful teachers. Most students score very highly on standardized tests (AP, SAT, ACT Exam, PSAT/NMSQT, High School Proficiency Assessment). In 2006, the average SAT score was 2,185: 713 Verbal, 770 Math, and 702 Writing, and more recent SAT scores have been similar. If this center was ranked as a separate high school, it would rank #2 out of more than 27,000 U.S. high schools based on SAT scores. However, as a STEM focused school it would place higher than top schools like High Technology High School. It also performs well in competitions such as the American Mathematics Contest or the Science League.

The program also provides students with the opportunity to get involved with internships and research, through the Honors Engineering Research course students take their senior year. For each half of the year, students can work on a research project or an individual supervised learning experience (SLE). For research projects, students can choose from eight topics: astronomy, computer interfacing, fluid statics and dynamics, laser art and communication, magnetic forces and fields, mathematical models, robotics, and alternative energy and environmental concerns. During these projects, students are encouraged to set and meet goals, and keep a log of their progress. For SLE's, the program helps place students at internships at local companies, including engineering firms, manufacturing firms, software development firms, telecommunications firms, solar energy installation companies, and public utility companies. Students are also able to pursue opportunities they find on their own. At the end of each half of the school year, students give final presentations summing up their work to their peers.

== Facilities ==
In addition to classrooms for mathematics, biology, chemistry, and physics, the program has a fully equipped and networked CAD and computer science classroom, an electronics lab, and is developing a makerspace in the school's former auto shop. The makerspace currently houses a laser cutter, several 3D printers, a tabletop CNC mill, a vacuum thermoforming machine, and various other tools, as well as workbench space, electronics prototype and test area, two robot arms, and a wide range of materials for multirotor and fixed wing drones, underwater robotics, and ground robotics. It is also a physical home for part of the Science and Engineering Library.

== Scientific journal and library ==
The program operates a peer-reviewed open access scientific journal, the Journal of Science and Engineering, that publishes high quality original research by promising students of science and engineering. The ISSN is 3066-7623 (online) and 3066-7607 (print). The Journal is indexed in Crossref and in Google Scholar and published articles are assigned digital object identifiers.

The program also has a library that houses college-level science and engineering references for student use. Special collections include Senior Project Logs (with holdings dating back to 1985) and the physical archives of the Journal of Science and Engineering.
