= Colts Neck High School =

High school in Monmouth County, New Jersey, US

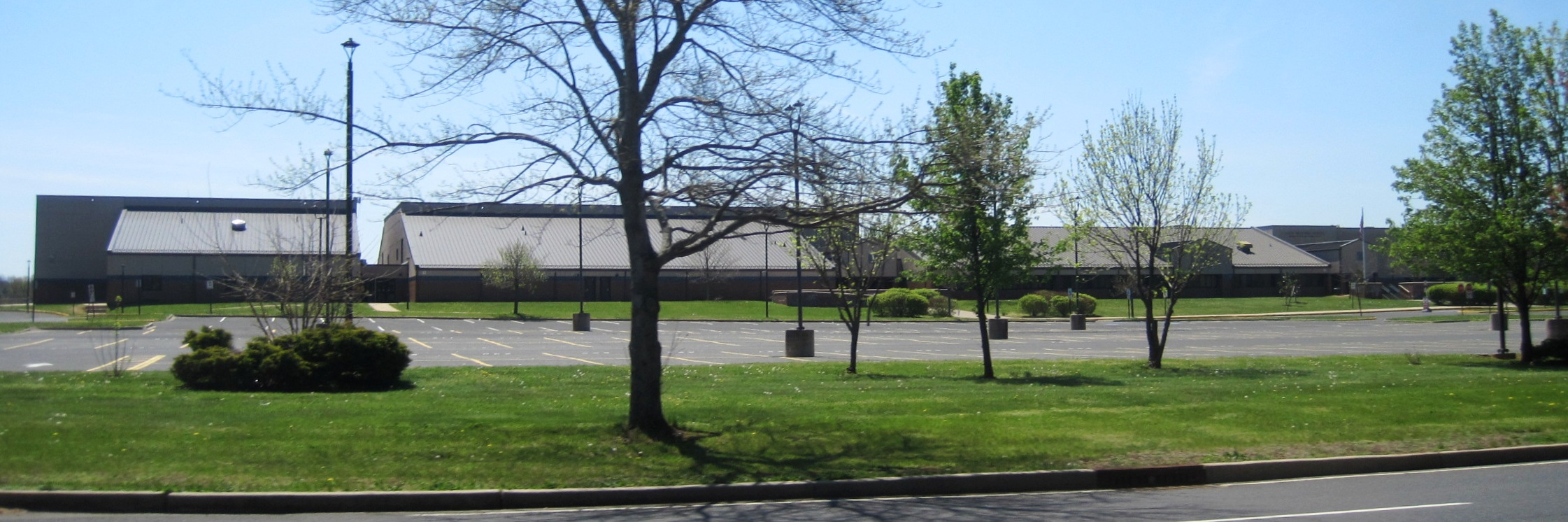
- Front of school as seen from CR 537

Location
- 59 Five Points Road; Colts Neck Township, Monmouth County, New Jersey 07722; United States; 40.275134°N 74.210314°W

Information
- Type: Public high school
- Motto: "Let the Tradition Begin"
- Established: 1998
- School district: Freehold Regional High School District
- NCES School ID: 340561000237
- Principal: Brian P. Donahue
- Faculty: 97.2 FTEs
- Grades: 9-12
- Enrollment: 1,430 (as of 2024–25)
- Student to teacher ratio: 14.7:1
- Colors: Green; Navy blue and Silver
- Athletics conference: Shore Conference
- Team name: Cougars
- Accreditation: Middle States Association of Colleges and Schools
- Newspaper: The Paw Print
- Website: coltsneck.frhsd.com

Colts Neck High School is a four-year comprehensive public high school located in Colts Neck Township, in Monmouth County, in the U.S. state of New Jersey, serving students in ninth through twelfth grades and operating as one of the six secondary schools of the Freehold Regional High School District. The school is located at the intersection of County Route 537 and Five Points Road. The school serves students from all of Colts Neck Township and from portions of both Howell Township and Marlboro Township. The school has been accredited by the Middle States Association of Colleges and Schools Commission on Elementary and Secondary Schools since 2008; its accredited status extends to July 2025.

As of the 2024–25 school year, the school had an enrollment of 1,430 students and 97.2 classroom teachers (on an FTE basis), for a student–teacher ratio of 14.7:1. There were 299 students (20.9% of enrollment) eligible for free lunch and 38 (2.7% of students) eligible for reduced-cost lunch.

The school's mascot is the cougar, which was chosen collectively by the student body in a competition. The school's motto is "Let The Tradition Begin."

== History ==
The earliest proposal for a high school in Colts Neck dates back to a May 1978, referendum that would have included a high school building in the township at a cost of $17 million (equivalent to $83.9 million in 2025), which was approved by Colts Neck voters but was overwhelmingly rejected by voters in the seven other constituent municipalities. In 1983, there was active consideration of having Colts Neck withdraw from the regional high school system, while the district considered renaming Marlboro High School, which was attended by Colts Neck students, as Marlboro-Colts Neck High School.

A 67-acre (27 ha) site was identified in 1986 as part of a project that would create a new Colts Neck High School that would cost an estimated $30 million (equivalent to $88.1 million in 2025) and could accommodate 1,300 students and would also expand other district facilities at a total cost of $36 million. In September 1986, voters approved the referendum by a 58%-42% margin, with Colts Neck residents providing much of the margin for passage. By 1988, the costs of construction of the new high school had soared by millions of dollars, exceeding the amount available from the referendum to cover the costs, leading to further delays. In February 1993, a judge ruled that the district had to move forward with construction of the new high school and could not put forth a referendum to undo the 1986 vote. In July 1994, the New Jersey Supreme Court refused to hear the case.

Construction began in August 1996, with expectations to have the building open in September 1998 to handle 750 incoming students, with an eventual capacity for 1,300.

The school opened in September 1998 as the sixth high school in the system, with 380 students in ninth and tenth grades.

Since the start of the 2016–17 school year, students in grades 9 through 12 from Naval Weapons Station Earle started attending Colts Neck High School, before which they had attended Monmouth Regional High School in Tinton Falls.

== Awards, recognition and rankings ==
The school was the 68th-ranked public high school in New Jersey out of 339 schools statewide in New Jersey Monthly magazine's September 2014 cover story on the state's "Top Public High Schools", using a new ranking methodology. The school had been ranked 103rd in the state of 328 schools in 2012, after being ranked 80th in 2010 out of 322 schools listed. The magazine ranked the school 109th in the magazine's September 2008 issue, which surveyed 316 schools across the state.

Schooldigger.com ranked the school tied for 72nd out of 381 public high schools statewide in its 2011 rankings (an increase of 61 positions from the 2010 ranking) which were based on the combined percentage of students classified as proficient or above proficient on the mathematics (89.4%) and language arts literacy (96.7%) components of the High School Proficiency Assessment (HSPA).

== Athletics ==
The Colts Neck High School Cougars compete in Division B North of the Shore Conference, an athletic conference comprised of public and private high schools in Monmouth and Ocean counties along the Jersey Shore. The league operates under the jurisdiction of the New Jersey State Interscholastic Athletic Association (NJSIAA). With 1,027 students in grades 10–12, the school was classified by the NJSIAA for the 2019–20 school year as Group III for most athletic competition purposes, which included schools with an enrollment of 761 to 1,058 students in that grade range. The school was classified by the NJSIAA as Group IV South for football for 2024–2026, which included schools with 890 to 1,298 students. Since the school opened in 2001, it has won numerous state, sectional, county, conference, and division titles.

The school participates with Raritan High School in a joint ice hockey team in which Freehold High School is the host school / lead agency. The co-op program operates under agreements scheduled to expire at the end of the 2023–24 school year.

=== Girls' soccer ===
In 2015, the girls' soccer team finished the season with a record of 24–0–1, winning the first Shore Conference title and the first state title for girls' soccer, defeating nationally top ranked Northern Highlands Regional High School by a score of 1–0 in the tournament final to win the Group III state championship.

=== Girls' basketball ===
The girls' basketball program set a single season record for wins in 2009 and won the Group IV state championship, defeating Columbia High School by a score of 58–52 in the tournament final. The team finished the season with a 29–4 record after losing in the finals of the Tournament of Champions by a score of 56–44 to St. John Vianney High School, which won their sixth Tournament of Champions title. In 2008 they won the Shore Conference Tournament with a 55–47 win over Rumson-Fair Haven Regional High School in triple overtime, the first public high school to win the conference title since 1989.

=== Girls' bowling ===
The girls' bowling team won the Group II state championship in 2019.

=== Field hockey ===
The 2017 field hockey team won the North II Group III state sectional championship with a 2–0 victory against Freehold High School.

=== Cross country / track & field ===
The cross country running and track program (in particular distance running) has been one of the school's most successful teams. The girls' cross country team has been nationally ranked three times, during the 2005, 2006 and 2007 seasons. The team also qualified for Nike Team Nationals in 2006 and finished 4th with Ashley Higginson (1st place), Briana Jackucewicz, Allison Donaghy, Kristen O'Dowd, Erin Donaghy, Allie Flott, Morgan Clark, and Allison Linnell (Linnell attended MAST.) This 2006 girls' team had wins at the 2006 Shore Conference, Monmouth County, Central Jersey Group IV, NJ Group IV, and NJ Meet of Champions. The cross country program also has produced three Foot Locker finalists (Briana Jackucewicz, Craig Forys, and Ashley Higginson).

The girls won state group cross country team titles in Group I in 2000, in Group III in 2005 and 2016–2018, and in Group IV in 2006.

The boys won the state Group III title in 2016, 2024 and 2025.

The indoor and outdoor track and field program has also been extremely successful having won six national titles, the boys indoor distance medley relay 2005, girls indoor 4 x 1-mile (1.61 km) Relay 2006 & 2007, boys indoor 2 mile (Craig Forys) 2007, girls indoor and outdoor 2 mile (Ashley Higginson) 2007. The track program also has produced numerous state champions and has held numerous state records, the most notable being the boys' 4 x 800 relay set in 2005 with a time of 7:39.54. Craig Forys set the New Jersey State 3000 meters and two-mile (3.2 km) records and Ashley Higginson set the New Jersey State 2 mile, 5000 meter and 2000 meter steeplechase records. The boys have won state group team titles in indoor track in Group III in 2016 and 2017.

The girls spring / outdoor track team won the Group III state championship in 2021.

=== Boys' basketball ===
In the 2015–16 season, the boys' basketball team captured its first state title, defeating crosstown rival Freehold Township High School by a score of 45–44 in the Central Jersey Group IV tournament final.

=== Boys' soccer ===
The team won the Group I championship in 2000, defeating runner-up Whippany Park High School by a score of 4–2 in the tournament final.

=== Softball ===
The softball team won the Group III state championship in 2021, defeating Cranford High School in the tournament final.

== Administration ==
The school's principal is Brian P. Donahue. His core administration team includes two assistant principals.

== Other high schools in the district ==
Attendance at each of the district's high schools is based on where the student lives in relation to the district's high schools. While many students attend the school in their hometown, others attend a school located outside their own municipality. In order to balance enrollment, district lines are redrawn for the six schools to address issues with overcrowding and spending in regards to transportation. The other five schools in the district (with 2024–25 enrollment data from the National Center for Education Statistics) with their attendance zones for incoming students are:

- Freehold High School with 1,376 students from Freehold (all) and Freehold Township (part)
- Freehold Township High School with 1,813 students from Freehold Township (part), Howell (part), Manalapan (part)
- Howell High School with 1,775 students from Farmingdale (all) and Howell (part)
- Manalapan High School with 1,690 students from Englishtown (all) and Manalapan (part)
- Marlboro High School with 1,700 students from Marlboro (part)

== Notable alumni ==
- Jake Areman (born 1996), soccer player who plays for the Tampa Bay Rowdies in the USL Championship
- Anthony DeSclafani (born 1990), MLB pitcher for the San Francisco Giants
- Ashley Higginson (born 1989), middle-distance runner who won the gold medal in the 3000 meter steeplechase at the 2015 Pan American Games
- Otandeka Laki (born 1996), footballer who plays as a winger and a striker for the Uganda women's national team
- Frankie Tagliaferri (born 1999), former professional soccer player who played as a midfielder in the National Women's Soccer League
- Amanda Visco (born 1997), former professional soccer player who played as a defender in the National Women's Soccer League and abroad
