= Scott Conover =

American football player (born 1968)

No. 76
- Positions: Tackle, guard

Personal information
- Born: September 27, 1968 (age 58); Neptune, New Jersey, U.S.
- Listed height: 6 ft 4 in (1.93 m)
- Listed weight: 285 lb (129 kg)

Career information
- High school: Freehold
- College: Purdue
- NFL draft: 1991: 5th round, 118th overall pick

Career history
- Detroit Lions (1991–1996)

Career NFL statistics
- Games Played: 67
- Games Started: 27
- Fumble recoveries: 1
- Stats at Pro Football Reference

Kelsey Scott Conover (born September 27, 1968) is an American former professional football player who was an offensive lineman for the Detroit Lions of the National Football League (NFL). He played college football for the Purdue Boilermaker and was selected 118th overall by the Lions in the fifth round of the 1991 NFL draft.

He appeared in a 2007 NutriSystem for Men commercial and spoke the line: "Scott Conover, 100 pounds." The product had the tag line: "Pizza, pot roast, pasta: Real food for real guys."

A native of Freehold Borough, New Jersey, Scott graduated from Freehold High School and went on to attend and play football at Purdue University in Indiana. While at Purdue, he was a defensive lineman for his first three seasons before being moved to offensive tackle. After only one season on the offensive line he was drafted into the NFL in the fifth round. He played six seasons in the NFL as offensive tackle for the Detroit Lions.
