= Darrell Reid =

American football player (born 1982)

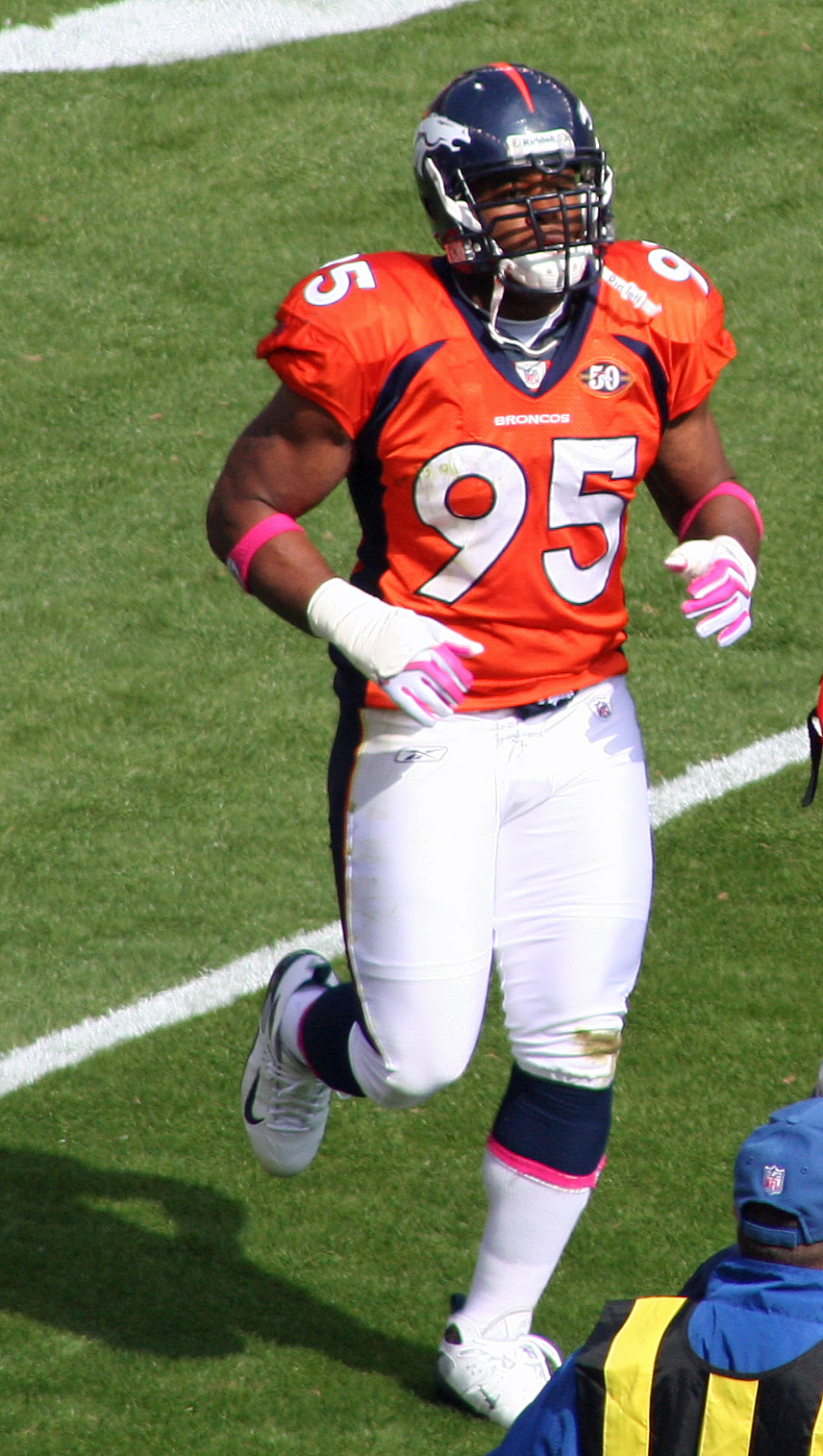
- Reid with the Broncos in 2009

No. 95
- Positions: Linebacker, defensive end

Personal information
- Born: June 20, 1982 (age 44); Freehold Borough, New Jersey, U.S.
- Listed height: 6 ft 2 in (1.88 m)
- Listed weight: 270 lb (122 kg)

Career information
- High school: Freehold
- College: Minnesota
- NFL draft: 2005: undrafted

Career history
- Indianapolis Colts (2005–2008); Denver Broncos (2009–2010)

Awards and highlights
- Super Bowl champion (XLI); Second-team All-Big Ten (2004)

Career NFL statistics
- Total tackles: 131
- Sacks: 6.5
- Forced fumbles: 2
- Fumble recoveries: 4
- Pass deflections: 2
- Stats at Pro Football Reference

Darrell Reid (born June 20, 1982) is an American former professional football player who was a linebacker in the National Football League (NFL). He played college football for the Minnesota Golden Gophers and was signed by the Indianapolis Colts as an undrafted free agent in 2005 and was a part of their Super Bowl XLI winning team against the Chicago Bears.

Born and raised in Freehold Borough, New Jersey, Reid attended Freehold High School.

== College career ==
Reid played college football for the Minnesota Golden Gophers from 2000-2004, where he was a four-year starter. He arrived at Minnesota as a linebacker, but was switched to defensive tackle in 2001. During his junior season, he led the team with 5.5 sacks. Reid switched to defensive end in 2004 and again led Minnesota in sacks with 7.5. This effort gained him a spot on the 2004 All-Big Ten Second-team.

== Professional career ==
=== Indianapolis Colts ===
Reid was signed as an undrafted free agent by the Colts, and spent time at the defensive tackle. He filled in as a fullback in goal line situations, and has played special teams.

Reid won Super Bowl XLI with the Colts in 2007.

=== Denver Broncos ===
On February 28, 2009, Reid signed a three-year, $10 million contract with the Denver Broncos. The deal includes a $1.3 million signing bonus and Reid could earn an additional $2.8 million through sack and playing-time incentives.

== NFL career statistics ==
Legend
**Bold**	Career high

=== Regular season ===
Year	Team	Games		Tackles					Interceptions					Fumbles			
Year	Team	GP	GS	Cmb	Solo	Ast	Sck	TFL	Int	Yds	TD	Lng	PD	FF	FR	Yds	TD
2005	IND	8	**1**	11	7	4	0.0	0	0	0	0	0	0	0	0	0	0
2006	IND	15	0	**35**	**26**	9	0.0	**5**	0	0	0	0	0	0	0	0	0
2007	IND	**16**	**1**	31	24	7	0.5	1	0	0	0	0	0	0	**2**	0	0
2008	IND	**16**	0	30	18	**12**	2.0	4	0	0	0	0	0	0	0	0	0
2009	DEN	**16**	0	24	18	6	**4.0**	1	0	0	0	0	**2**	**2**	**2**	0	0
		71	2	131	93	38	6.5	11	0	0	0	0	2	2	4	0	0

=== Playoffs ===
Year	Team	Games		Tackles					Interceptions					Fumbles			
Year	Team	GP	GS	Cmb	Solo	Ast	Sck	TFL	Int	Yds	TD	Lng	PD	FF	FR	Yds	TD
2005	IND	1	0	1	1	0	0.0	0	0	0	0	0	0	0	0	0	0
2006	IND	**4**	0	**8**	**7**	**1**	0.0	**1**	0	0	0	0	0	0	0	0	0
2007	IND	1	0	2	2	0	0.0	0	0	0	0	0	0	0	0	0	0
2008	IND	1	0	2	2	0	0.0	0	0	0	0	0	0	0	0	0	0
		7	0	13	12	1	0.0	1	0	0	0	0	0	0	0	0	0

== Health care fraud case ==
Reid was charged with one count of conspiracy to commit wire fraud and health care fraud, one count of wire fraud, and one count of health care fraud by the United States Department of Justice on July 24, 2020. He pleaded guilty by December 2020. By February 2022, he had been sentenced to 180 days of house arrest and ordered to perform 240 hours of community service.
