= Amy Polumbo =

American musician and pageant winner

Amy Polumbo (born November 20, 1984) was crowned Miss New Jersey 2007. She is from Howell Township, New Jersey, where she graduated from Howell High School in 2003. She graduated from Wagner College, where she studied musical theatre and psychology. She left college for some time to star as Ariel in The Voyage of The Little Mermaid in Hollywood Studios at Walt Disney World. She received her master's degree in Speech-Language Pathology from The School of Communication Sciences and Disorders at The University of Memphis.

Polumbo is working on a narrative about her Miss New Jersey experiences. She was a subject of some controversy in July 2007 when compromising photos from her private Facebook account were mailed to the pageant board by a group calling itself "The Committee to Save Miss America." These photos were later released to the media and the issue received national attention. In an interview on NBC's Today Show, Amy Polumbo said the photos show no nudity, pornography or underage drinking. In a later interview on The Today Show, the photos were released and were received by the public as anything but scandalous. Her attorney has denied the rumors that the incident was a publicity stunt. In addition to The Today Show, Polumbo appeared on The O'Reilly Factor and MSNBC with Dan Abrams. However, she turned down numerous interview opportunities and considered changing her name because of this incident.

Polumbo was the winner of the Miss America: Reality Check trivia competition which won the Red Team an advantage in the final stage. Polumbo won a Non-finalist Talent Award at the 2008 Miss America Pageant
