= Honey, We're Killing the Kids =

Television series

- Genre: Documentary
- Country of origin: United Kingdom
- Original language: English

Honey, We're Killing the Kids is a BBC Three television series in which parents are shown the consequences of poor parenting. The programme shows computer-generated images and technology of what their children may look like as adults if they continue with their present life-style, dietary and exercise habits. It was also adapted for the American network TLC in 2007.

== Format ==
First, a family with issues relating to their parenting, dietary and exercise habits is introduced. Then, the children are examined by physicians and psychologists, and every aspect of their eating habits and physical activity is analysed by an expert team. Then, the parents are shown what their children may look like by taking present-day photos of them and age-progressing the photos with a computer year by year until age forty. The parents are frequently brought to tears when presented with the likelihood of their children's unhappy future appearance and significantly reduced life expectancy.

Some traits are exaggerated for effect. Highly variable traits such as clothes, hairstyles, jewelry, eyeglasses, facial hair, and so forth are added to the computer generated images based on guesses by the show at the social and educational impact current poor parenting may have on the children's future lives. These guesses at highly variable traits are swayed depending on the outcome predicted by the show's child experts based upon the likely life expectancy, state of health and emotional stability of the children. Bad haircuts and glasses may be used for the previous version while the finished version has the computer generated images smiling and wearing a suit. Another example, in the premier TLC episode, an eight-year-old boy was given a mullet, an earring, nerdy-looking eyeglasses, and a soul patch at age fifteen. In another episode, an eight-year-old girl was given a bad case of acne as she went through her teenage years. Rosacea, obesity, tooth decay, and hair loss also seem to be common ailments added to the age-progression. These guesses at personal traits are present in all episodes to dramatise the harmful physical, emotional effects of a poor diet and poor parenting, and the major impact the show's experts say these are likely to have on the children's future well being.

The show follows families' home lives for a period of four weeks. During this period they follow a manual of instructions written by experts including a child psychologist, a fitness expert and a dietician. At weekly interventions to this regime they are criticized by the show's host and given three new 'rules' targeted at each family specifically, to help them be better parents. Rules have been primarily aimed at the children, including both diet and exercise, but there have also been a couple of rules for adults, such as giving up smoking (and in one case going back to university). Practices such as "Home Cooking" and "Get Active" have been introduced, as well as recommendations aimed at fostering emotional stability such as "Honey Time", a practice encouraged where the parents set aside time before bedtime, to praise positive things their children have done that day. It is generally accepted that positive reward and praise of children is likely to enhance their social and educational chances in later life, by making them more confident and emotionally secure.

Many families are from socially deprived backgrounds and derive significant benefit from simple improvements in diet. The show also features many second families or blended families reflecting widespread social upheaval and change in traditional modes of parenting, and focusing on the dilemmas of stepparents and stepchildren.

Despite the arguably exaggerated computer generated images, the show has contributed to a widespread public debate about parenting which has included the television series Jamie's School Dinners initiated by Jamie Oliver in the UK.

== International versions ==
Legend: Currently airing No longer airing Upcoming version

Country	Title	Broadcaster	Star	Original run
United States	Honey, We're Killing the Kids	TLC	Samantha Bessudo Drucker	2006–2007
New Zealand	Honey, We're Killing the Kids (Maori: E te honi, kei te patu matou i nga tamariki)	TV3	Louise Schofield	2007–2008
Poland	Kochanie, ratujmy nasze dzieci!	TVP2	Tomasz Wolny	2016–present
Russia	Дорогая, мы теряем наших детей (Honey, we're losing our kids)	REN TV	Oleg Sus	2013
Canada	Honey, We're Killing the Kids Canada	Food Network (Canada)	Lisa Hark	2006–2007
Ukraine	Кохана, ми вбиваємо дітей	СТБ	Dmytro Karpachov	2011–2016

== Critical reception ==
Common Sense Media rated the show 3 out of 5 stars, stating that it "has all the annoying elements of a reality show: constant replaying of dramatic moments, meetings in an eerie gothic mansion, editing that may not tell the whole story, and a pat ending. But...the show aims to help real families who struggle with real problems. And to this end, the show does a good job promoting healthy ideas while staying away from labeling kids as 'fat' or 'lazy'. They also described the show as ''a diet makeover show in a Supernanny format." Pop Matters was less favorable, writing that it "combines Dr. Phil's self-scourging pap with the sight of chubby children being deprived of the things they love".
