= Bradevelt, New Jersey =

Populated place in Monmouth County, New Jersey, US

- Unincorporated community
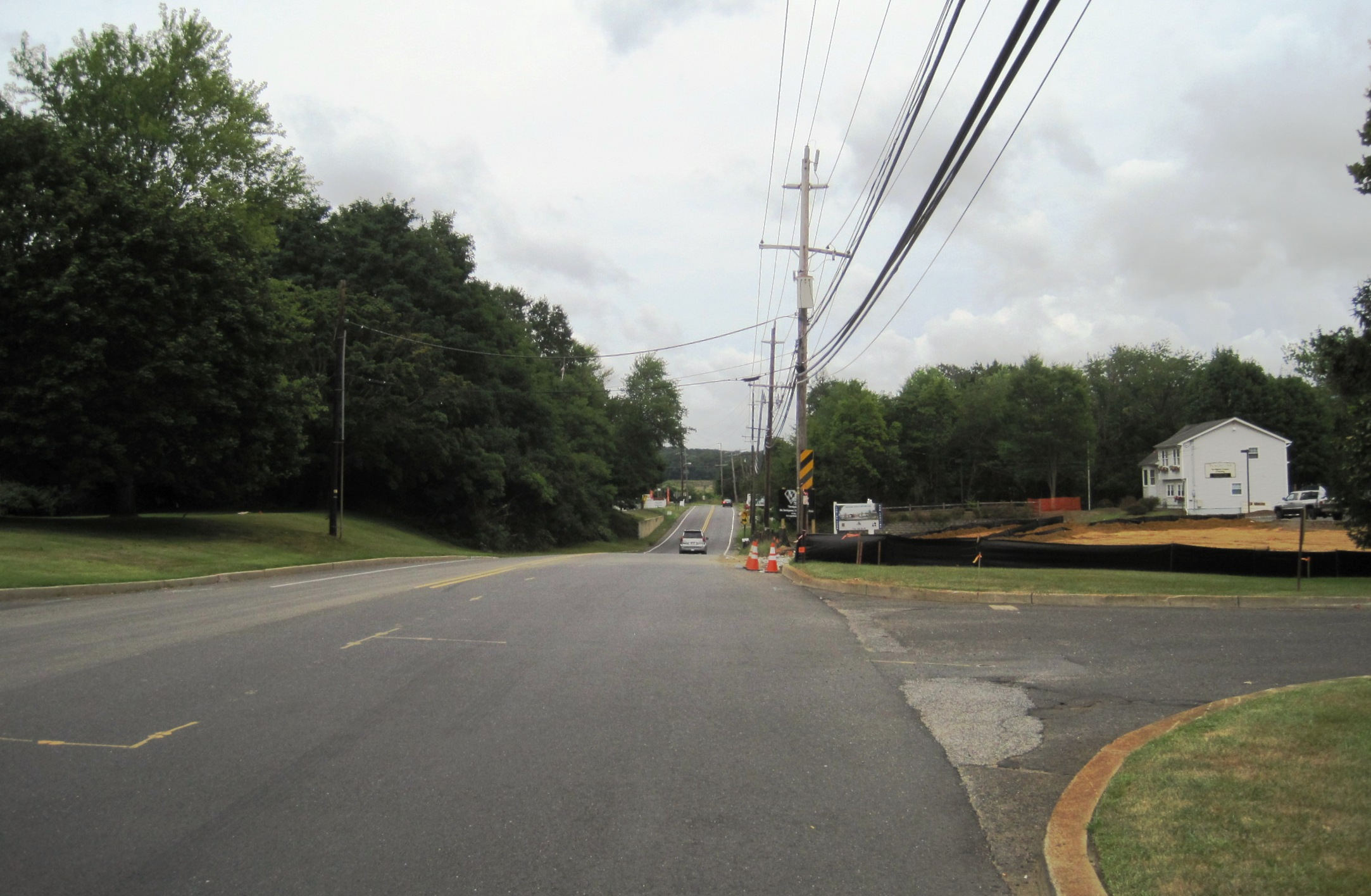
- Looking east along CR 520

- Location in Monmouth County (Inset: Monmouth County in New Jersey) Bradevelt (New Jersey) Bradevelt (the United States)
- Coordinates: 40°20′04″N 74°14′22″W
- Country: United States
- State: New Jersey
- County: Monmouth
- Township: Marlboro
- Elevation: 161 ft (49 m)
- ZIP Code: 07746
- GNIS feature ID: 0874884

Bradevelt is an unincorporated community located within the Morganville section of Marlboro Township, in Monmouth County, in the U.S. state of New Jersey. County Route 520 travels through Bradevelt, while Route 79 is located west of the community. The area consists of a mix of businesses along the two main roads, farmland, and the remains of the Marlboro Psychiatric Hospital which is being converted to Big Brook Park. The former Monmouth County Agricultural Railroad (a portion of which is now part of the Henry Hudson Trail) runs north and south through Bradevelt. Early to mid 1800s the area was called Hulsetown.

== Agriculture ==
Produce was shipped to many locations nationally. The New York Times describes a harvest time observation that at one point, as many as 100 wagons and horses were in line waiting to unload at the train station. However, the area was also known for Rome, Paragon and Stark apples, which won awards as well as peaches, corn and amber wheat. In 1908, "the largest ear of corn ever grown in New Jersey... was picked"—it contained twenty-six rows of large corn on it.

In addition to farming produce, the area also hosted most other livestock commonly found on a farm. At various times, the area was known for turkey production and other poultry, boar, Berkshire pigs, calves, cows, Khedive Bulls, horses and ads to sell them were common in local livestock magazines.

Some years were bad for the farmers, Army worm were heavily infesting the farms in the area in 1924 and then in 1925, the area was heavily infested with Japanese beetle. The infestation was so bad that the township of Marlboro, and specifically Bradevelt was placed under a Quarantine. All produce sold had to be certified by the state lab in Riverton where it had to be inspected free of Japanese beetles. This had a dramatic negative effect on selling produce that year.

== Structures ==
=== School ===
There was a two-story red school house on Route 520 in Bradevelt re-purposed from a house in 1810, which was torn down in 1913 and replaced for 1914 school year. In this school, future U.S. Vice President Garret Hobart as well as his father Addison Hobart and future Assemblyman John D. Honce were teachers. Frank Dugan came from this school and later became important to the educational system in Marlboro; a school is named after him.

=== Psychiatric hospital ===
In 1928, construction of a Marlboro Psychiatric Hospital was begun. The main entrance to the hospital was on route 520 in Bradevelt. The hospital transferred 500 patients from Graystone Hospital in 1931 when it opened.

The 509 acres purchased by the state for the hospital grounds were purchased for $76,000. It was reported that the houses and farms which were obtained in 1928 were considered "very old". Some of the structured destroyed were built before the Revolutionary War.

=== Post office ===
Bradevelt had a post office. In 1865, the mail was handled by Patrick Carton who lost an arm in the Civil War. Mail delivery started as twice a day. In 1929, it was changed to once daily in the evening; then changed to morning delivery. However, the population did not support a separate dispatch and the Post Office was closed in February 1932. Mail for the area was sent to the main Marlboro office.

=== Historic churches ===
Two historic churches serve Bradevelt. Both Located on Route 520, the first is St. Gabriel's Chappel. Built by Fr. Frederick Kivelitz in 1878, the church served the community until a larger church was built in Marlboro. St. Gabriel's Church is known for an annual carnival. In 1949, the carnival featured the Yankees baseball team featuring Phil Rizzuto and Snuffy Stirnweiss. The second church was started in 1709, as the "First Reformed Church of Freehold", but in 1931 changed its name to "Old Brick Reformed Church". In 1826, the church reconstructed the building and erected the present edifice.

=== Train station ===
One of seven railroad station stops along the twelve mile railroad line from Matawan to Freehold was located by Route 520 in Bradevelt. Potatoes & Marl were a main crop and product for the area. In 1914, 225,000 barrels of potatoes were shipped from the Bradevelt station. The depot burned down in May 1926. Following the fire, a rail car was used for the station agent and ticket sales.

== Other features ==
Illegal alcohol stills were very common in the Bradevelt area during the prohibition. In some cases, the stills would explode causing barn and house fires.

Found in a Marl pit in Bradevelt was evidence that New Jersey had chestnuts growing 60 million years ago. This was after a well preserved specimen was found and identified by the Yale Forest School.

The area was known for good fishing on the Hop Brook. Trout, Pike, pickerel and perch were known to be caught on this stream.
