= Herberts Corner, New Jersey =

Herberts Corner, New Jersey may refer to:

- Herberts Corner, Monmouth County, New Jersey
- Herberts, New Jersey in Middlesex County
