= Robertsville, New Jersey =

Populated place in Monmouth County, New Jersey, US

- Census-designated place
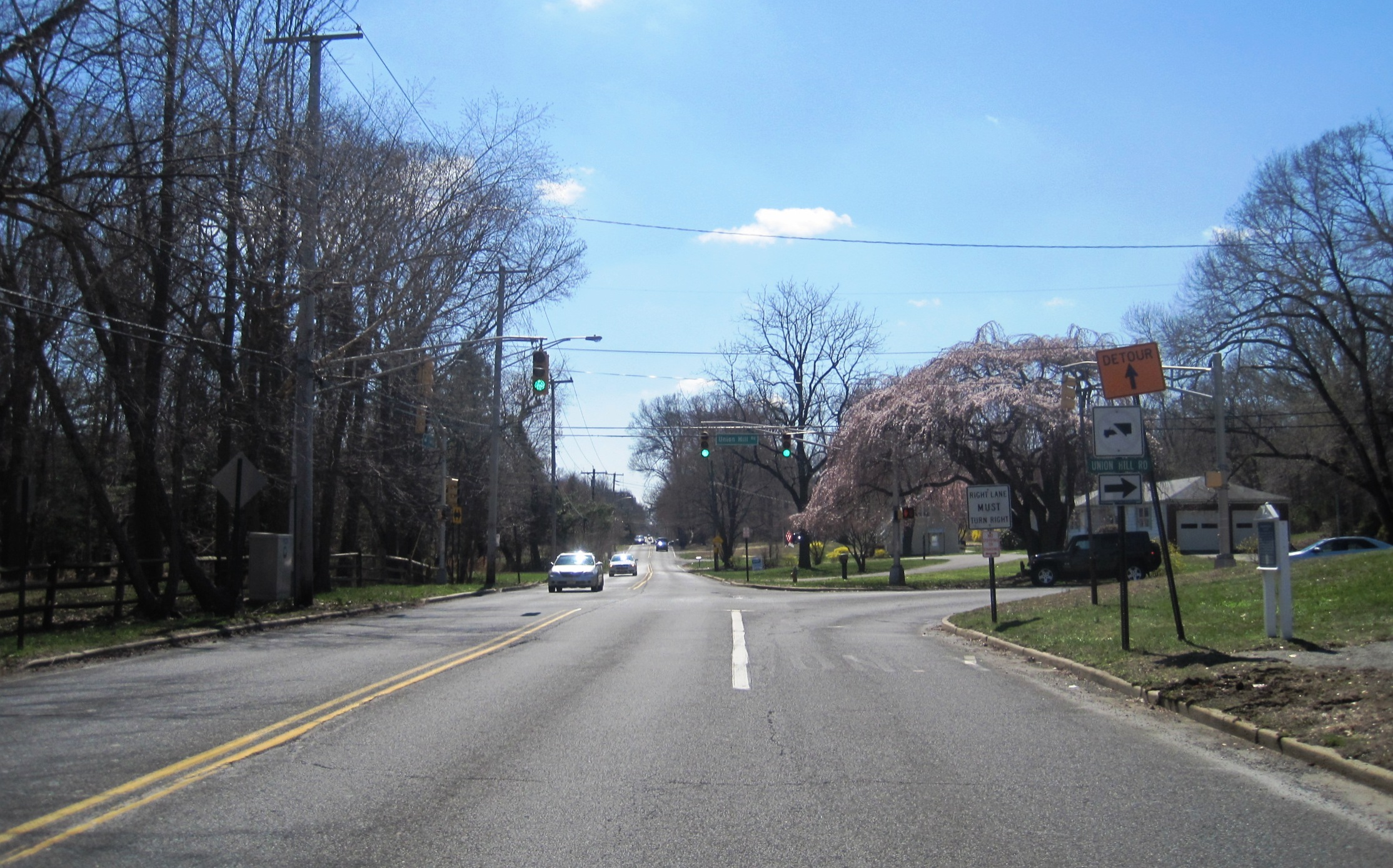
- Tennent Road (CR 3) and Union Hill Road

- Location in Monmouth County Location in New Jersey Location in the United States
- Coordinates: 40.338759°N 74.294388°W
- Country: United States
- State: New Jersey
- County: Monmouth
- Township: Marlboro

Area
  - Total: 5.92 sq mi (15.32 km^{2})
  - Land: 5.90 sq mi (15.29 km^{2})
  - Water: 0.012 sq mi (0.03 km^{2}) 0.21%
- Elevation: 160 ft (50 m)

Population (2020)
  - Total: 11,399
  - Density: 1,931.1/sq mi (745.61/km^{2})
- Time zone: UTC−05:00 (Eastern (EST))
  - Summer (DST): UTC−04:00 (Eastern (EDT))
- ZIP Codes: 07726 (Englishtown); 07746 (Marlboro); 07751 (Morganville)
- Area codes: 732/848
- FIPS code: 34-63900
- GNIS feature ID: 02634200

Robertsville is a census-designated place and unincorporated community in Marlboro Township, Monmouth County, in the U.S. state of New Jersey. As of the 2020 census, the CDP's population was 11,399.

== Geography ==
Robertsville is in northern Monmouth County, in the western corner of Marlboro Township. It is bordered to the southwest by Manalapan Township and to the northwest by Old Bridge Township in Middlesex County. U.S. Route 9 passes through the west side of the community, leading south 6 miles (10 km) to Freehold Borough, the Monmouth county seat, and north 9 miles (14 km) to South Amboy. The New Jersey Route 18 expressway runs along the eastern side of Robertsville, with access to the community from Exit 29 (Tennent Road). Route 18 leads northwest 13 miles (21 km) to New Brunswick and southeast 14 miles (23 km) to the Garden State Parkway at Tinton Falls.

According to the United States Census Bureau, the Robertsville CDP has a total area of 5.915 square miles (15.320 km^{2}), including 5.903 square miles (15.289 km^{2}) of land and 0.012 square miles (0.031 km^{2}) of water (0.20%).

== Demographics ==
Historical population
Census	Pop.	Note	%±
1980	8,461		—
1990	9,841		16.3%
2000	11,255		14.4%
2010	11,297		0.4%
2020	11,399		0.9%
Population sources: 1980; 1990-2010; 2010 under the name Morganville in the 2000 census

The community first appeared as a census designated place under the name Robertsville in the 1980 U.S. census. The CDP was renamed as Morganville for the 2000 U.S. census. The original name was restored to Robertsville for the 2010 U.S. census.

=== Racial and ethnic composition ===
Robertsville CDP, New Jersey – Racial and ethnic composition Note: the US Census treats Hispanic/Latino as an ethnic category. This table excludes Latinos from the racial categories and assigns them to a separate category. Hispanics/Latinos may be of any race.
Race / Ethnicity (NH = Non-Hispanic)	Pop 2000	Pop 2010	Pop 2020	% 2000	% 2010	% 2020
White alone (NH)	9,565	9,145	8,456	84.98%	80.95%	74.18%
Black or African American alone (NH)	183	261	220	1.63%	2.31%	1.93%
Native American or Alaska Native alone (NH)	1	2	7	0.01%	0.02%	0.06%
Asian alone (NH)	1,097	1,320	1,695	9.75%	11.68%	14.87%
Native Hawaiian or Pacific Islander alone (NH)	5	1	2	0.04%	0.01%	0.02%
Other race alone (NH)	13	20	34	0.12%	0.18%	0.30%
Mixed race or Multiracial (NH)	60	90	213	0.53%	0.80%	1.87%
Hispanic or Latino (any race)	331	458	772	2.94%	4.05%	6.77%
Total	11,255	11,297	11,399	100.00%	100.00%	100.00%

=== 2020 census ===
As of the 2020 census, Robertsville had a population of 11,399. The median age was 44.5 years. 23.5% of residents were under the age of 18 and 17.2% were age 65 or older. For every 100 females, there were 98.3 males; for every 100 females age 18 and over, there were 95.2 males.

100.0% of residents lived in urban areas, while 0.0% lived in rural areas.

There were 3,758 households, and 38.7% had children under the age of 18. Of all households, 73.4% were married-couple households, 7.9% were households with a male householder and no spouse or partner present, and 16.4% were households with a female householder and no spouse or partner present. About 13.0% of households were made up of individuals, and 7.8% had someone living alone who was 65 years of age or older.

There were 3,833 housing units, of which 2.0% were vacant. The homeowner vacancy rate was 0.3% and the rental vacancy rate was 6.3%.

=== 2010 census ===
At the 2010 census, there were 11,297 people, 3,792 households, and 3,230.784 families living in the CDP. The population density was 1,908.6 per square mile (736.9/km^{2}). There were 3,941 housing units at an average density of 665.8 per square mile (257.1/km^{2}). The racial makeup of the CDP was 84.21% (9,513) White, 2.39% (270) Black or African American, 0.03% (3) Native American, 11.7% (1,324) Asian, 0.01% (1) Pacific Islander, 0.59% (67) from other races, and 1.05% (119) from two or more races. Hispanic or Latino of any race were 4.05% (458) of the population.

Of the 3,792 households 42.4% had children under the age of 18 living with them, 77.3% were married couples living together, 6.0% had a female householder with no husband present, and 14.8% were non-families. 13.0% of households were made up of individuals, and 7.1% were one person aged 65 or older. The average household size was 2.98 and the average family size was 3.27.

The age distribution was 27.0% under the age of 18, 6.3% from 18 to 24, 20.2% from 25 to 44, 33.7% from 45 to 64, and 12.7% 65 or older. The median age was 42.8 years. For every 100 females there were 95.3 males. For every 100 females ages 18 and older there were 92.3 males.

== Education ==
Children residing in the Robertsville area in public school attend Robertsville Elementary School, as part of the Marlboro Township Public School District.

== Transportation ==
Tennent Road (County Route 3), Newman Springs Road (County Route 520), U.S. Route 9, and the Route 18 freeway travel through Robertsville.
