= Anthony Spalliero =

- Born: July 30, 1942; Maddaloni, Italy
- Died: December 19, 2010 (aged 68); Edison, New Jersey, U.S.
- Occupations: Real Estate developer, connected with organized crime
- Status: Deceased
- Conviction: Bribery
- Criminal charges: Aggravated assault, Theft of a backhoe and Bribery.

Antonio "Anthony" Spalliero (July 30, 1942 in Maddaloni – December 19, 2010 in Edison, New Jersey) was a real estate developer with ties to organized crime. From 1968 to 2005, Spalliero had been arrested at least eight times, and indicted twice, though most of the charges were dismissed or dropped.

In 2007, he was convicted of paying $100,000 in bribes to Marlboro mayor Matthew Scannapieco. He was sentenced to pay $125,000 in fines and serve one year of home confinement and two years of probation.
