= Burnt Fly Bog =

Superfund site in New Jersey, United States

- Superfund site
- Location within Monmouth County, New Jersey Location within New Jersey
- Location: Marlboro, Monmouth, New Jersey; 40.376357°N 74.280810°W

Information
- CERCLIS ID: NJD980504997
- Responsible parties: Champion Chemical Company; Eagle Asphalt Company; Ace-Manzo Inc

Progress
- Proposed: December 30, 1982
- Listed: September 8, 1983
- Construction completed: September 21, 2004

The Burnt Fly Bog Superfund Site is located in Marlboro Township in Monmouth County, New Jersey. Contamination began in the 1950s and 1960s. It was used as a dumping ground for hazardous chemicals and oils. This site was used to reprocess or recycle oil, and it was also used as a landfill during the 1950s. The contamination affected the surface water and soil. The EPA got involved in the 1980s and addressed the situation. Human health concerns were a main part of the EPA getting involved because residents lived only about 1,000 to 2,000 feet around the site. Major components of the remedy included excavation and off-site disposal of contaminated soil from Northerly Wetlands, Tar Patch Area. The back filling of the areas addressed, monitoring of the surface water and sediments, and biological sampling in the Westerly Wetlands. The current status of the site is complete. The remedial stages were completed in the late 1990s and a five-year monitoring of the surface water was completed around 2004.

== Origins ==
Burnt Fly Bog is a rural area covering about 1,700 acres (690 ha) of Marlboro Township, Monmouth County. Burnt Fly Bog consists of an Uplands Area and Westerly Wetlands where most of the waste was dumped. It also includes four lagoons: Asphalt Area, the Tar Patch Area, Northerly Wetlands and the Westerly Wetlands.

=== Town history ===
Marlboro is a rural area consisting of dairy, tomato, and potato farms. Before World War II, the township was the nation’s largest grower of potatoes. Around the 1950s and 1960s the population grew tremendously. After the war the state began to improve and build transportation infrastructure in the township. Developments of housing and buildings began to replace the farm and rural areas of the town, and it became a growing suburb for people that were working in New York and in the large corporations near the town.

=== Company history ===
The company Ace-Manzo Inc was the one involved in the waste and chemical dumping in Burnt Fly Bog. Ace-Manzo Inc. is a privately owned company based in Matawan, New Jersey. The owners are Dominick and Carmella Manzo. The company handles water, sewer and utility lines within construction and contractor sectors. The company was founded by Dominick Manzo in 1958. Current estimates show this company has an annual revenue of 19 million dollars. The EPA also blamed Champion Chemical, Imperial Oil and Emil Stevens. The EPA implicated Champion Chemical, Imperial Oil, and Emil Stevens, but they were never successful in proving that they were responsible, although they dumped the oil. The EPA did win a case against Ace-Manzo making them the main cause for the creation of the Superfund site. The state recovered about $1.9 million from a federal lawsuit which held Dominick and Carmella Manzo responsible for the dumping of hazardous materials and waste in Burnt Fly Bog, however, it was purchased with the contamination.

== Superfund designation ==
The site was addressed in four stages, one immediate action and three long-term remedial phases which were to focus on clean-up of the Uplands Area and Westerly Wetlands. Immediate actions started in 1982. The immediate action focused on installing a security fence around the lagoons that contained the oils and sludge to hold back any contents. This prevents any contaminated liquids from drifting from the site. The next two stages focused on two sections of the site. They excavated contaminated soil and disposed of the waste and hazardous materials.

The last stage focused on 3 sections of the site. They dug up and disposed of PCB- and lead-contaminated soil. They restored the ground with new soil and started construction on the site. The clean-up process continued until 1998 and the EPA began a five-year review of the site. Every five years, the EPA will inspect the condition of the site.

=== State and national intervention ===
The EPA got involved around the 1980s, almost 20 years after the initial dumping at the site began.

The EPA began the restoration process to complete the performance measures, which includes human exposure, groundwater migration, construction completion (physical cleanup for entire site) and anticipated use. The EPA got involved because the waste and chemicals that were present affected the ground water. This affected the residents' drinking water and main water source. The chemicals also affected the fish and other animals around the site. Health issues were another main concern prompting the EPA to get involved. The chemicals that flooded the lagoons and land caused health issues for the people surrounding the area. Chemicals like lead, PCBs, and methylene chloride had serious effects on people like lung/kidney irritation, rashes, fatigue, GI discomfort and even cancer, which is hard to prove because of the many causes of cancer.

== Health & Environmental Hazards ==
Lagoons were made for storage of waste oil and other aqueous wastes. It was also used as a landfill and dump location. These reprocessed oils and other types of waste entered surface waters and also contaminated the soil.

=== Lead ===
Lead was one of the chemicals that were discovered in tested soil samples. Lead is a heavy, blue-gray metal commonly found in pigments/paints, pipes, cable covers, and storage batteries. Lead exposure can cause weakness in joints and muscles, and it can severely damage the brain and kidneys in either children or adults. It can cause miscarriages in pregnant women and can damage the reproductive system in males. The U.S. Environmental Protection Agency has classified lead as a probable human carcinogen.

=== PCBs ===
Polychlorinated Biphenyls are synthetic chemicals that have no known sources in the environment. They are oily, colorless or light yellow and can either be solid or liquid. PCBs have no smell. When exposed to the chemical, rashes and acne can be present. It can also cause irritation of the respiratory and digestive systems, induce fatigue, and cause harm to the blood and liver.

== Cleanup ==
The cleanup process of the Superfund Site has been completed. The contaminated soil and sludge from the Uplands Area has been replaced. About 90,000 tons of contaminated soil which contained high levels of PCBs was removed and disposed. In Westerly Wetlands about 6,000 tons of PCB-contaminated soil was dug up. In 1996, the site was considered completed, and the EPA continued to monitor for five more years.

=== Initial cleanup ===
The initial cleanup started in 1982 where the EPA repaired an earth mound to hold back the contents of the lagoons. A fence was put in place around the site for removal of the contaminated soil and sludge in the Uplands Area. This was done for to prevent contact with hazardous materials and to prevent the sludge from moving anywhere else. EPA conducted a plan for the cleanup which included removing hazardous materials in the asphalt area, tar patch area and drummed waste area, and removing soil and sludge that contained high levels of PBCS, then replanting and restoring the area. After the cleanup has been completed the EPA designed a five-year program to monitor the groundwater. This plan was in place for two contaminated areas of Burnt Fly Bog; the Uplands Area and the Westerly Wetlands.

=== Current status ===
The site investigation started around July 1982 and the remedy action did not start until 1983 because the EPA was selecting the proper remedy for the site. The final remedial stages of the site were completed in September 1998. The final completion of the final construction of the site was not completed until September 2004.

EPA also continues to review the site for inspection and the most recent review was done in June 2016.

== See also ==
Love Canal
