= MMMS =

MMMS may refer to:

- Mabelvale Magnet Middle School, a magnet middle school in Little Rock, Arkansas
- Marlboro Memorial Middle School, a middle school in Marlboro Township, New Jersey
- Meads Mill Middle School, a middle school in Northville, Michigan.
- Merry Marvel Marching Society, a Marvel Comics fan club of the 1960s and 70s
