= Devitte Military Academy =

Military academy in New Jersey, United States

Coordinates: 40.377845°N 74.261540°W

The Devitte Military Academy was an American military academy founded in 1918 by Major Leopold Devitte and Suzanne Jacques DeVitte. It started as the "Devitte School" but changed its name in 1927. It closed in 1979.

Starting out as co-educational residential school, in 1920, it became an all-male school. It was located on Wolleytown Road in the Morganville section of Marlboro Township, Monmouth County, New Jersey.

At its start, the school campus covered about 70 acres. In 1931 it expanded to 80 acres. By 1974, the campus had been scaled back to 58 acres of "athletic and academic facilities".

The school closed in 1943 but reopened in 1952.

Most of the students were from the United States, Mexico and Central America.

== School functions ==
The heavily wooded campus consisted of five buildings: the main building, two dormitory buildings, a classroom and recreation hall. There were a few maintenance outbuildings, athletic fields and a pool.

The main building was called the "main house" which included four dormitory rooms, "Cosmo's room", a sick bay and infirmary, mess hall, kitchen, a gymnasium, and the Headmaster's quarters. The two dedicated dormitory buildings were named "Washington House" and "Pershing House". The school building was simply called "the school house". Cosmo's room was the private abode for one Cosmo Thomaselli, who had been adopted by the Sweeneys after, as a student, his parents had been killed in an automobile accident.

The headmaster was Major Leopold DeVitte (? - 1952), who retired in 1945. The title of "Major" was "self-designated officership". Then Captain Charles J. Pratt was commander, followed by Captain Walter J. Sweeney. The headmaster in the 70s was M.J. Ratajczak, who died suddenly in 1975.

Major DeVitte and Mrs. Devitte rest in the Old Tennent Cemetery in Manalapan, NJ.

The school's motto was "Where discipline is firm, but fair".

In 1935, a review of the camp stated that "Motion pictures are shown twice a week and there is a pool".

In 1930 the school cost $720 a year, increasing to $,2900 in the last school year.

The school was for boys aged 6 to 16, and offered elementary to 9th grade instruction. It was open 12 months a year when it started, but was later changed to a 10-month school year. In the last year of school, 1978, the enrollment had dwindled to 50 students.

Originally, the instruction was offered only as a residential program, but in 1975, the program offered day students without a residential component.

The academy had a marching band. This frequently led local parades and played in area holiday celebrations.

== Current land use ==
Following the school's closing, the property was purchased by Harold L. Doty. Some of the property was used for the "Little Flower Children's Center". The pool, playgrounds, ball fields and other facilities were used by the day care center. The owners also lived on the property. After this use, the property was sold off in smaller parcels, but about 30 acres were purchased for the Sri Guruvaayoorappan Temple. All buildings but one were demolished. One of the buildings was re-purposed and adapted for the Hindu-American Temple, which currently occupies the campus.
