= Marlboro Jewish Center =

- Location in Monmouth County, New Jersey

Religion
- Affiliation: Conservative Judaism
- Ecclesiastical or organizational status: Synagogue
- Leadership: Rabbi Michael Pont
- Status: Active

Location
- Location: 103 School Road West, Marlboro, New Jersey 07746
- Country: United States
- Interactive map of Marlboro Jewish Center
- Coordinates: 40°19′24″N 74°16′02″W

Architecture
- Completed: 1970

Website
- mjcnj.com

Marlboro Jewish Center (Congregation Ohev Shalom) is a Conservative synagogue located at 103 School Road West, Marlboro, Monmouth County, New Jersey, in the United States. The synagogue was completed in 1970.

Current spiritual leaders are Rabbi Michael Pont and Cantor Michelle Teplitz. This congregation has contributed to the community as a top USY chapter in all of New Jersey.
