= High Point Schools =

Schools in New Jersey, United States

The High Point Schools are a group of private special education elementary and adolescent schools located on a 10-acre (40,000 m^{2}) campus in the Morganville section of Marlboro Township, in Monmouth County, New Jersey, United States. The schools provide educational and therapeutic services for students ages 5 – 21 who have emotional, behavioral and learning difficulties. The schools are a division of CPC Behavioral Healthcare.

For the 1993-94 school year, High Point Elementary School was awarded the National Blue Ribbon Award of Excellence from the United States Department of Education, the highest honor that an American school can achieve.
