= Matthew Scannapieco =

Matthew V. Scannapieco

Mayor of Marlboro, New Jersey
- In office January 1992 – December 2003
- Preceded by: Saul Hornik
- Succeeded by: Robert Kleinberg

Personal details
- Born: May 21, 1944 (age 81) Staten Island, New York, U.S.
- Party: Republican
- Spouse(s): Barbara (1978-2002); Michelle (2002-2005)

Military service
- Allegiance: United States
- Branch/service: United States Army
- Battles/wars: Vietnam War

Matthew V. Scannapieco (born May 21, 1944) is an American politician who served as Mayor of Marlboro, New Jersey from 1992 to 2003. During the course of his career in public service, Scannapieco, a Republican, also served on the Township Council, the Planning Board and the Zoning Board of Adjustment. During his tenure as mayor, he sat on the planning board and appointed all but one of the other members. During this time, Marlboro township experienced a 40 percent increase in housing units in Marlboro, or nearly 3,500 new units. In 2005, in the case of United States of America v. Matthew V. Scannapieco, he was charged with illegally accepting cash payments to influence planning processes and tax evasion.

== Legal problems ==
Scannapieco pleaded guilty to accepting $245,000 in bribes from several land developers.

The former mayor also pleaded guilty to tax evasion, specifically for failing to pay federal taxes on the money he accepted from several land developers involved with W.B. Associates.

In August 2015, he pleaded guilty to child sexual abuse. At the age of 71, he was sentenced to 25 years in custody.
