= Henry Hudson Trail =

Rail trail in Monmouth County, New Jersey

Coordinates: 40°25′49″N 74°06′30″W

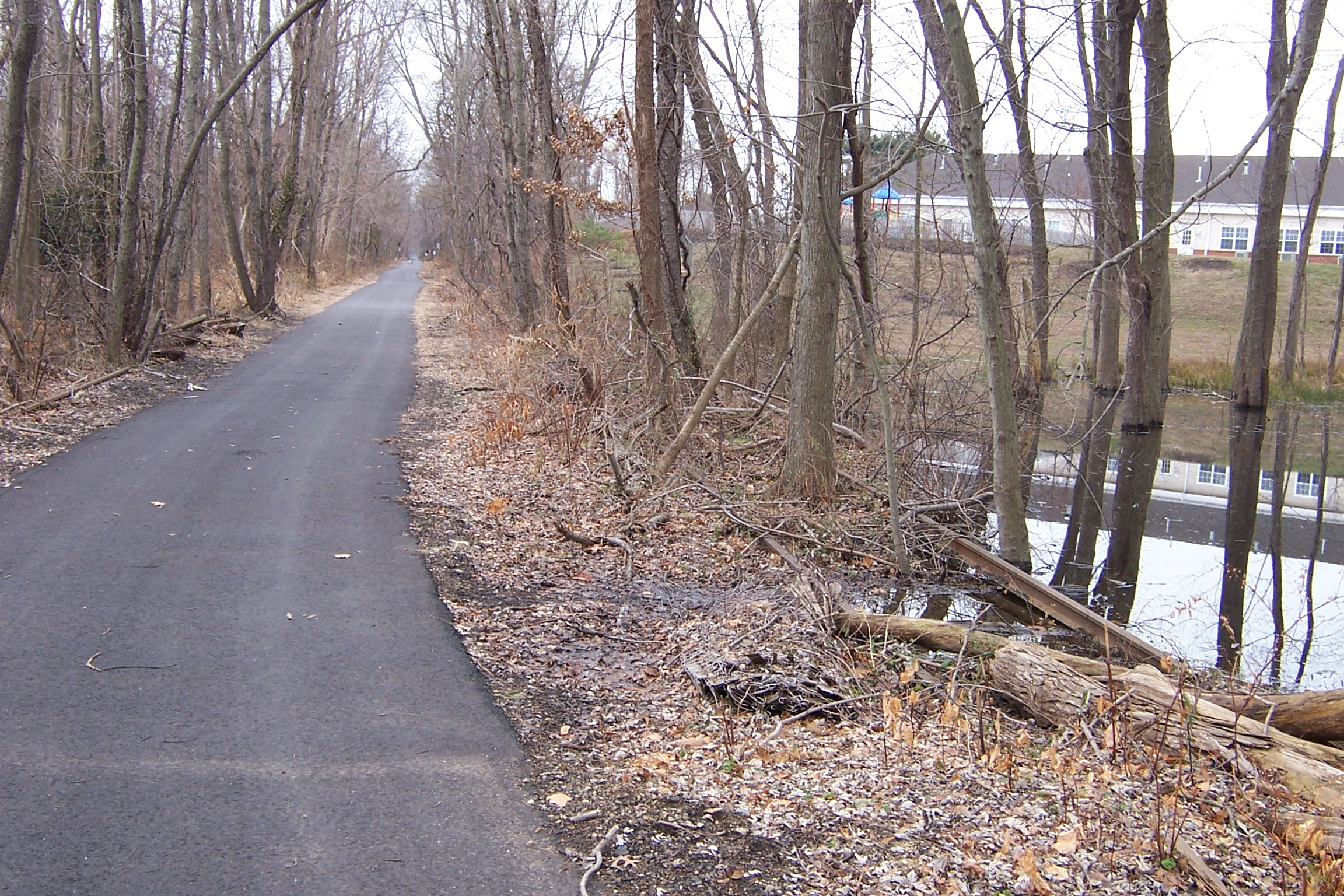
- Along the southernmost segment of the trail, in Marlboro Township. Abandoned rails can be seen on both sides.
- Length: 24 mi (39 km)
- Location: Monmouth County, New Jersey
- Trailheads: Route 537 in Freehold Borough; Allen Road in Marlboro Township; Wyncrest Road in Marlboro Township; Church Street in Matawan; Lloyd Rd. and Clark St. in Aberdeen/Keyport; Avenue D in Atlantic Highlands
- Use: Cycling, Running, Hiking
- Difficulty: Easy
- Season: Year round
- Surface: Asphalt
- Right of way: Monmouth County Agricultural Railroad, Freehold and Atlantic Highlands Railroad

The Henry Hudson Trail is a rail trail in western and northern Monmouth County, New Jersey. The trail is named for Henry Hudson, who explored the harbor at Atlantic Highlands and the Raritan Bayshore coastline in the early 1600s. The 24-mile-long (39 km), 10-foot-wide (3.0 m) paved multi-use trail is part of the Monmouth County Park System. The rail trail traverses the Raritan Bayshore region from Highlands and connects inland to Freehold Borough using the former rights-of-way of several rail lines. Although trees line much of the trail, it affords some views of surrounding wetlands, streams, woodlands and fields. It traverses through the municipalities of Freehold Township, Marlboro Township, Matawan, Aberdeen Township, Keyport, Union Beach, Hazlet, Keansburg, Middletown Township, and Atlantic Highlands.

The Garden State Parkway, the North Jersey Coast Line, and several abandoned rail bridges in Matawan and Aberdeen is the dividing line between the northern and southern sections of the trail. The northern section runs 12 miles east from the Aberdeen-Keyport border to Highlands, north of and roughly parallel to Route 36. A missing link in Atlantic Highlands requires on-road travel between Avenue D and the Atlantic Highlands marina. The southern (inland) section runs south from Matawan to Freehold Borough. A long missing link between Wyncrest Road and Big Brook Park in Marlboro divides this inland section into its own north and south segments, but planning is underway to connect the segments in 2025.

The property for the inland sections is currently railbanked by New Jersey Transit (NJT), which leases the line for trail usage to the Monmouth County Park System. The trail is administered by the Monmouth County Park System and is leased through 2020 for use as a trail. If future economic conditions warrant resuming operation, NJT reserves the right to restore rail service at any time. The railroad line was never officially abandoned, unlike most rail trails.

The Henry Hudson Trail was the first rail-trail developed in Monmouth County, and was joined by the Union Transportation rail-trail in 2010.

== Trail sections ==
=== Inland South ===
The southern segment of the inland section runs from downtown Freehold north to Allen Road in Marlboro (near Marlboro High School and Route 79). This section was largely opened in 2006. In 2013 a connecting trail was built from a point near the Allen Road terminus to the trails of the county's Big Brook Park. In 2024, the trail was extended further south into Freehold Borough.

=== Inland North ===
The northern segment of the inland section runs from Wyncrest Road in Marlboro north to Stillwell Street in Matawan, generally paralleling Route 79 for much of the way. This section was opened in 2006, with a short additional stretch completed in 2011. This segment has an old train station which has fallen into disrepair due to no longer being used.

=== Atlantic ===
The Atlantic section running east–west was the first to be developed, opening in 1992. The route roughly parallels Route 36 from the Garden State Parkway to Atlantic Highlands, with trail heads at Lloyd Road and Clark Street in Aberdeen/Keyport and Avenue D in Atlantic Highlands. This section suffers from many busy road crossings.

=== Avenue D & Center Avenue parallel ===
East of the Atlantic sections terminus at Avenue D, a one mile (2 km) on-road detour is required to connect to the Bayshore extension to Highlands. It then turns onto Center Avenue, where it connects to the Bayshore trail.

=== Bayshore Trail extension ===
A 1.4 miles (2.3 km) Bayshore extension opened in April 2009 and extends the Henry Hudson Trail eastward from the Atlantic Highlands marina below the bluffs of Atlantic Highlands, ending at Popamora Point Park at the western end of Highlands. The entirety of this segment is concurrent with the Bayshore Trail.

== History ==
The Marlboro Township section of the rail line began in the 1860s as the Monmouth County Agricultural Railroad. The initial discussion concerning the construction of the railroad began in the 1840s, as an improved means of hauling produce to Keyport docks. The initial effort failed and began again in 1867 with work being completed about 1880. The railroad carried produce, manufactured goods and marl fertilizer to the rail pier in Keyport. The marl was dug from the large pits owned by many local farmers such as O.C. Herbert or Uriah Smock in Marlboro. The railroad can be seen on a map from 1873. All service ceased in the 1950s. The original 9-mile (14 km) "Atlantic" section is built on the former right-of-way of the Freehold and Atlantic Highlands Railroad, which was later absorbed by the Central Railroad of New Jersey.

In September 2009, a portion of the southern section of the trail from Texas Road (Matawan) to Greenwood Road (Marlboro) was closed for an 18-month project for a Superfund cleanup at the site of the former Imperial oil company.

In 2001, NJT resurrected the idea of utilizing the rail corridor for its MOM commuter rail line. According to the Sierra Club, should the transit agency opt to restore commuter service along the line, it would be the first instance in U.S. history where a rail trail reverted to railway usage.

== Future additions ==
The missing section in Marlboro Township, New Jersey, between Wyncrest Rd. and Big Brook, is in the process of being developed, set for a trail opening in 2025.

== See also ==
- Assunpink Trail
- Delaware and Raritan Canal Trail
- Lenape Trail
- Middlesex Greenway
- Union Transportation Trail
