= Marlboro Township Public School District =

School district in Monmouth County, New Jersey, US

Address
- 1980 Township Drive Marlboro Township, Monmouth County, New Jersey, 07746; United States
- Coordinates: 40.326734°N 74.2669°W

District information
- Grades: PreK–8
- Superintendent: Michael Ballone (acting)
- Business administrator: Vincent Caravello
- Schools: 8

Students and staff
- Enrollment: 4,537 (as of 2022–23)
- Faculty: 410.6 FTEs
- Student–teacher ratio: 11.1:1

Other information
- District Factor Group: I
- Website: www.mtps.org
Ind.	Per pupil	District spending	Rank (*)	K–8 average	%± vs. average
1A	Total Spending	$16,421	27	$18,891	−13.1%
1	Budgetary Cost	14,359	44	14,159	1.4%
2	Classroom Instruction	8,430	38	8,659	−2.6%
6	Support Services	1,812	21	2,167	−16.4%
8	Administrative Cost	1,573	44	1,547	1.7%
10	Operations & Maintenance	2,309	83	1,612	43.2%
13	Extracurricular Activities	100	47	104	−3.8%
16	Median Teacher Salary	63,195	57	61,136
Data from NJDoE 2014 Taxpayers' Guide to Education Spending. *Of K–8 districts with more than 750 students. Lowest spending=1; Highest=84

The Marlboro Township School District is a community public school district that serves students in pre-kindergarten through eighth grade in Marlboro Township in Monmouth County, in the U.S. state of New Jersey.

As of the 2022–23 school year, the district, comprised of eight schools, had an enrollment of 4,537 students and 410.6 classroom teachers (on an FTE basis), for a student–teacher ratio of 11.1:1.

The district is classified by the New Jersey Department of Education as being in District Factor Group "I", the second-highest of eight groupings. District Factor Groups organize districts statewide to allow comparison by common socioeconomic characteristics of the local districts. From lowest socioeconomic status to highest, the categories are A, B, CD, DE, FG, GH, I and J.

Most public students in ninth through twelfth grades from Marlboro Township attend Marlboro High School, which is part of the Freehold Regional High School District, with some Marlboro students attending Colts Neck High School. The district also serves students from Colts Neck Township, Englishtown, Farmingdale, Freehold Borough, Freehold Township, Howell Township and Manalapan Township. Many Marlboro students attend the various Learning Centers and Academies available at other district high schools and students from other municipalities in the district attend Marlboro High School's Business Learning Center. As of the 2022–23 school year, Marlboro High School had an enrollment of 1,816 students and 112.2 classroom teachers (on an FTE basis), for a student–teacher ratio of 16.2:1 and Colts Neck High School had an enrollment of 1,432 students and 91.2 classroom teachers (on an FTE basis) and a student–teacher ratio of 15.7:1.

== History ==
Preschool had in prior years been taught in the original "one room" Robertsville School built in 1832; this building still stands, down the road from the current Robertsville Elementary School.

== Awards and recognition ==
In 2022, the United States Department of Education announced that Defino Central Elementary School was named as a National Blue Ribbon School, along with eight other schools in the state and 297 schools nationwide.

== Schools ==
The district has eight school facilities: one pre-school, five elementary schools and two middle schools. The schools in the district (with 2022–23 enrollment data from the National Center for Education Statistics) are:

Preschool

- David C. Abbott Early Learning Center with 187 students (opened 2002) serves kindergarten and preschool special education.
  - Albert Perno, principal

Elementary schools

- Defino Central Elementary School with 526 students in grades K–5 (opened 1957)
  - David Stratuik, principal
- Frank J. Dugan Elementary School with 649 students in grades K–5 (opened 1987)
  - Richard M. Pagliaro, principal
- Asher Holmes Elementary School with 447 students in grades 1–5 (opened 1973)
  - JoAnn Cilmi, principal<ref.Contact and Hours, Asher Holmes Elementary School. Accessed September 25, 2024.</ref>
- Marlboro Elementary School with 493 students in grades K–5 (opened 1971)
  - Mitch Shatz, principal
- Robertsville Elementary School with 461 students in grades 1–5 (opened 1968)
  - Anthony Giarratano, principal

Middle schools

- Marlboro Memorial Middle School with 1,004 in grades 6–8 students, opened in 2003, and is home of the Monarch Lions, with the school colors of maroon and gold.
  - John Pacifico, principal
- Marlboro Middle School with 755 students in grades 6–8, opened in 1976 and is home of the Hawks.
  - Patricia Nieliwocki, principal

== Athletics ==
The Marlboro Mavericks is a wrestling team jointly shared by the two middle schools. Founded in 2004, they have a franchise record of 33–6, with three Divisional Championships, along with two consecutive tournament championships and in 2005–2006 had a perfect 12–0 record in dual meets.

== Administration ==
Core members of the district's administration are:

- Michael Ballone, superintendent
- Vincent Caravello, business administrator and board secretary

== Board of education ==
The district's board of education, comprised of nine members, sets policy and oversees the fiscal and educational operation of the district through its administration. As a Type II school district, the board's trustees are elected directly by voters to serve three-year terms of office on a staggered basis, with three seats up for election each year held (since 2013) as part of the November general election. The board appoints a superintendent to oversee the district's day-to-day operations and a business administrator to supervise the business functions of the district.
