= Waste oil =

Unsuitable petroleum-based or synthetic oil

Waste oil is defined as any petroleum-based or synthetic oil that, through contamination, has become unsuitable for its original purpose due to the presence of impurities or loss of original properties.

== Differentiating between "waste oil" and "used oil" ==
The U.S. EPA defines the term "used oil" as any petroleum or synthetic oil that has been used, and as a result of such use is contaminated by physical or chemical properties. "Used oil" is a precise regulatory term. "Waste oil" is a more generic term for oil that has been contaminated with substances that may or may not be hazardous. Any oil contaminated with hazardous waste may itself be a hazardous waste, and if so, must be managed subject to hazardous waste management standards. Both used oil and waste oil require proper recycling or disposal to avoid creating an environmental problem.

== Products used as waste oil ==
Some examples of types of products that after use, can be labeled as used oil are: hydraulic oil, transmission oil, brake fluids, motor oil, crankcase oil, gear box oil, synthetic oil, and grades 1, 2, 3 and 4 fuel oil.

== Disposal of waste oil ==
Waste oil can be disposed of in different ways, including sending the used oil off-site (some facilities are permitted to handle the used oil such as local garages and local waste disposal facilities), burning used oil as a fuel (some used oil is not regulated by burner standards, but others that are off-specification used oil can only be burned in either industrial furnaces, certain boilers, and permitted hazardous waste incinerators), and marketing the used oil (claims are made that the used oil is to be burned for energy recovery, and then it is shipped to a used oil burner who burns the used oil in an approved industrial furnace or boiler). Oils that are off-specification typically contain: Arsenic 5 ppm, Cadmium 2 ppm, Chromium 10 ppm, Lead 100 ppm, Flash point 100 °F, minimum (i.e., FP must be greater than 100 °F), Total Halogens >4,000 ppm

== Storage and handling of waste oil ==
For on-site burning of used oil, the oil must be stored in tanks or containers, above or underground. The containers must be in good condition with no leaks, the tanks/containers must be labeled with the words “used oil”, and there must be a spill prevention plan (or a control and countermeasures plan).

=== Used Oil Management ===
In 1984 the Florida Department of Environmental Protection (DEP) implemented a used oil management program under Sections 403.75 through 403.769, Florida Statutes. Florida’s Used Oil Recycling Program has grown to become one of the most successful in the United States and has received national recognition.

=== Waste oil furnaces and boilers ===
Waste oil furnace is a type of furnace used for heating purposes and is fueled by used oil that is free of hazardous contaminants, as described by the EPA. Waste-oil-fueled boilers can be used for various industrial purposes as well as heating.

== See also ==
- Dangerous goods
- Hydraulic oil
- Motor oil
- Oil depletion
- Vegetable oil used as fuel
