= Charles H. Boud =

American politician (1843-1921)

Member of the New Jersey General Assembly from Monmouth County
- In office 1884–1885

Freehold Director of Monmouth County
- In office 1882–1883
- Preceded by: Austin H. Patterson
- Succeeded by: John C. Hathaway

Member of the Monmouth County Board of Chosen Freeholders from Howell Township
- In office 1879–1883

Personal details
- Born: October 3, 1843 Red Bank, New Jersey, US
- Died: September 1, 1921 (aged 77) Dover, New Jersey, US
- Resting place: Farmingdale Evergreen Cemetery
- Party: Democrat

Charles H. Boud (October 3, 1843 – September 1, 1921) was an American Democratic Party politician from New Jersey, who served on the Monmouth County, New Jersey Board of Chosen Freeholders and the New Jersey General Assembly.

== Biography ==
Boud was born on October 3, 1843, in Red Bank, New Jersey, and lived his entire life in Farmingdale, New Jersey. He worked as a Stationmaster for the Pennsylvania Railroad and the New Jersey Southern Railroad before working as superintendent of the Freehold and Squankum Marl Company.

In 1879, Boud was elected to the Board of Chosen Freeholders representing Howell Township and served until 1882. At the May 11, 1882, annual reorganization, he was chosen as Director of the Monmouth County, New Jersey Board of Chosen Freeholders, and served as Director for one year before leaving the board.

In 1882 he was Secretary of the Monmouth County Democratic/Republican Executive Committee.

In the 1883 general election, Charles H. Boud was elected to a one-year term in the New Jersey General Assembly.

Boud died in Dover, New Jersey, on September 1, 1921, and is buried in Farmingdale Evergreen Cemetery in Howell, New Jersey.

== See also ==
- List of Monmouth County Freeholder Directors

== Notes and references ==
Political offices
Preceded by Austin H. Patterson	Monmouth County Freeholder Director; 1881-1882	Succeeded by John C. Hathaway
