= Mayor of Long Branch, New Jersey =

List of mayors of Long Branch, New Jersey

The Mayor of Long Branch, New Jersey is the chief executive officer of the city of Long Branch, New Jersey, United States.

What is now Long Branch was split off from Shrewsbury, New Jersey, in 1849 to become Ocean Township, Monmouth County, New Jersey. On April 11, 1867, it became the Long Branch Commission (or Board of Trade) with limited jurisdiction by three commissioners.

The city was incorporated by an act of the New Jersey Legislature on March 29, 1904 (njleg-128-0376-77) replacing the Long Branch Commission. On May 20, 1904, the city council adopted the Coult Charter as the new form of government, based on the results of a referendum on May 17, 1904, approved by voters. It was officially an independent city. On November 7, 1960, the voters again changed the form of government from Commissioners to Manager-Council. While the council was still elected by the citizens, the mayor was selected by the nine-man council.

Since 1966, enacted by direct petition, the city is governed under the Mayor-Council (Plan A) form of municipal government, the Faulkner Act. The government of consists of a Mayor and a five-member City Council, whose members are elected at-large in nonpartisan elections to serve four-year terms of office on a concurrent basis. Elections, which are held in May, are non-partisan so that party affiliations of candidates are not mentioned on ballots. The inauguration of the new government takes place the following July 1.

The next election for Long Branch Mayor and Council is May 14, 2030.

== Mayors ==
Mayor	Birth and death	Term	Notes
John Pallone	(1955–Present)	2018 to present	John Pallone is the current Mayor of Long Branch, New Jersey. He was first elected on May 8, 2018 defeating then-incumbent Mayor Adam Schneider and long-time School Board Member Avery Grant. Pallone is a fourth-generation Long Branch native, the son of a police detective sergeant, and the younger brother of Congressman Frank Pallone. He was sworn in on July 1, 2018, by then-Governor Phil Murphy. Before serving as Mayor, he served on the city council from 1990 to 1994 and again from 2010 to 2018. As Mayor, Pallone oversaw the city’s response to the COVID-19 pandemic, including coordinating public health communications, supporting vaccination and testing efforts, and managing municipal operations during periods of emergency restrictions and economic uncertainty. His administration also focused on expanding recreational and community spaces, including the opening of New Jersey’s first fully accessible beach, development of a new community pool complex, and plans for a 500-foot all-weather fishing pier funded in part through $5 million in state aid. Under Pallone’s leadership, the city pursued infrastructure and civic improvement projects, including upgrades to the Elberon station area, renovations to the Long Branch Public Library, Senior Center, and Arts and Cultural Center, and restoration efforts at the historic Church of the Seven Presidents Museum. During this period, the Long Branch Public Library also received the National Medal for Museum and Library Service, one of the nation’s highest honors for libraries and museums. He was re-elected unopposed in 2022 and 2026 alongside his full council slate. His third term will conclude on June 30, 2030.
Adam Schneider	(1954–Present)	1990 to 2018	Adam Schneider is an attorney who was elected Mayor of Long Branch in May 1990 over opponents Bill George and Reuben Williams after Mayor Philip D. Huhn decided not to run for re-election to a third term. Before becoming Mayor, Schneider was first elected to the Long Branch City Council in a special election in 1988 to fill an open seat left by newly elected Congressman Frank Pallone. In the beginning of his time as Mayor, he inherited a heavily blighted oceanfront, stemming from the June 8, 1987 gas leak and electrical fire that completely destroyed the historic Long Branch Pier. His administration launched the Long Branch Redevelopment Plan between 1994 and 1996. The goal was to revitalize the waterfront into what eventually became the multi-million dollar residential and commercial hub known as Pier Village. In the interim, he gained national prominence for using eminent domain to seize private, non-blighted oceanfront properties for upscale redevelopment. His policies sparked major backlash and extensive legal battles. He also oversaw the initial rebuilding of the Long Branch oceanfront amidst the damage caused by Hurricane Sandy in 2013. He was re-elected six times and is unequivocally known to be the longest serving Mayor in the city's history after having served 28 years in office. His seventh and final term ended on June 30, 2018.
Philip D. Huhn	(1945–Present)	1982 to 1990	As a political newcomer, Philip D. Huhn defeated three-term incumbent Mayor Skip Cioffi in a major upset during the May 1982 municipal election. He was overwhelmingly re-elected to a second four-year term in 1986, receiving approximately 82% of the vote. Huhn served as mayor until 1990, when he chose not to seek a third term. Following his tenure as mayor, Huhn served as City Manager of Keansburg from 1993 to 1999 before later serving as Business Administrator for Neptune Township.
Henry R. "Skip" Cioffi	(1932-2020)	1970 to 1982	Henry R. "Skip" Cioffi served three consecutive terms as Mayor of Long Branch from 1970 to 1982. During his 12-year tenure, he reduced municipal taxes eight times, including the city's first tax reduction in 14 years. His administration acquired land for what became Seven Presidents Park, established a land bank for future park development, secured funding for the construction of Ocean Boulevard, supported the electrification of the North Jersey Coast Line, revitalized the city's pier and oceanfront, and initiated one of New Jersey's first successful municipal recycling programs. Cioffi also expanded youth recreation and athletic programs and imposed temporary curfews in 1972 in response to youth violence. He was unseated by Philip D. Huhn in the 1982 mayoral election.
Paul Nastasio, Jr.	(1907-1996)	1966 to 1970	Interviewed in 1969 about association with organized crime suspects in Long Branch.
Vincent J. Mazza	(1925-2016)	1965 to 1966	He was appointed in 1965. In 1966 Long Branch switched from the council–manager government to the mayor-council government. This was the second time in five years that Long Branch switched its form of government.
Milton Ferdinand Untermeyer Jr.	(1914–1980)	1963 to 1965	He served on the commission that recommended that Long Branch change to a new government system.
Thomas L. McClintock	(1926-2016)	1961 to 1963	He also served as the Mayor of Colts Neck, New Jersey. He appears to be the only person to have served as mayor of two different municipalities in Monmouth County, New Jersey. He served in the positions 12 years apart. Long Branch adopts a council–manager government.
Paul Kiernan		1958 to 1961	
Daniel Joseph Maher	(1893-1980)	1955 to 1958	
Alexander Vineburg	d. 1966	1953 to 1955	
J. William Jones		1948 to 1953 (?)	This was his second term.
Paul Kiernan	(1906/07-1989)	1944 to 1948	This is his first term. He became mayor on May 9, 1944. He also served as the Sheriff of Monmouth County, New Jersey.
Alton Verran Evans	(1904-1989)	1933 to 1944	He became mayor for his second consecutive term on May 12, 1936. He was born on August 8, 1904, in Larchmont, New York, to Lillian and Moses E. Evans. He attended Swarthmore College and in 1928 he graduated from New York Law School. He was admitted to the New Jersey Bar Association in 1929. He married Getrude M. Hunt on June 24, 1931. He was a member of the District Court of the County of Monmouth, New Jersey from 1943 to 1948. He was the presiding judge on the same court from 1948 to 1965. He served on the New Jersey Superior Court from 1972 to 1974.
Charles Dorman McFaddin		1932 to 1936	He became mayor in 1932.
J. William Jones		1928 to 1932	This was his first term. He was born in Long Branch and became mayor in 1928. He also served as the commissioner of parks and public property.
Frank Leslie Howland	(1877-1946)	1924 to 1928	He became mayor in 1924.
Clarence James Housman	(1869-1932)	1920 to 1924	He became mayor in 1920. There was an attempt to recall him as mayor. He died on November 14, 1932.
John Walter Flock Sr.	(1873-1952)	1918 to 1920	He became mayor in May 1918. He was born in Allentown, New Jersey, on July 30, 1873. He died on December 7, 1952, in Oceanport, New Jersey.
Marshall Woolley		1916 to 1918	He became mayor on May 9, 1916.
Bryant Baxter Newcomb	(1867-1945)	1912 to 1916	He became mayor on May 7, 1912. He also served on the Board of Chosen Freeholders for Monmouth County. He died on February 1, 1945, at Monmouth Memorial Hospital after being struck by a taxicab.
Henry Joline		1912	Henry Joline was the city council president and was briefly acting mayor in the absence of Edwin Washington Packer from February 1912. Packer resigned as mayor on April 9, 1912 and Joline's role as acting mayor ended with the appointment of Bryant Baxter Newcomb in May.
Edwin Washington Packer	(died 1926)	1910 to 1912	He became mayor in November 1910. Packer left on vacation in February 1912 and during his absence was charged with corruption. His whereabouts were unknown for some time after his due date of return. Upon his reappearance, he pleaded non vult, was fined US$500 and resigned as mayor on April 9, 1912. He died on May 18, 1926.
Charles O. McFaddin	(1859-1920)	1906 to 1910	He became mayor on November 6, 1906. He was born on September 25, 1859, in Lewisburg, Pennsylvania. He married Emma Price of Oceanport, New Jersey, and was the father of future mayor Charles Dorman McFaddin. McFaddin was twice president of the Long Branch Chamber of Commerce. He was the superintendent of freight and passenger rates for the New York and Long Branch Railroad. He also served as a Long Branch city commissioner. He died on February 25, 1920, in Long Branch of heart failure.
Charles Asa Francis	(1855-1934)	1903 to 1906	He was the first mayor under the reincorporation of Long Branch as a city on April 8, 1903. He was born on October 28, 1855, in Ardena, New Jersey. He died on April 18, 1934, in Long Branch, New Jersey.
Walter S. Reed		1901 to 1903	He became mayor on February 22, 1901. He was a physician.
Benjamin Morris		1900 to 1901	His term ended on February 22, 1901.
Augustus Chandler		1899 to 1900	He was born in March 1849 in New Jersey and he died on June 19, 1922, in Long Branch, New Jersey.
Rufus Blodgett	(1834-1910)	1894 to 1898	This was his first term. He served seven terms as mayor. He also served as the superintendent of the New York & Long Branch Railroad for 25 years.
George W. Brown		1890 to 1893	This was his second term.
Thomas Ridge Wooley		1886 to 1887	This was his second term. He was elected on September 13, 1886.
Wilbur Arthur Heisley		1887 to 1890	His biography states that he was elected in 1886. Thomas Ridge Wooley also appears in this time slot in an account in the New York Times.
George W. Brown		1884 to 1886	This was his first term.
Richard Woodward		1883 to 1884	
Thomas Ridge Wooley	(1841-?)	1879 to 1883	This was his first term. He was born in Philadelphia, Pennsylvania, on March 10, 1841, to Jordan Woolley. Jordan Woolley was the Sheriff of Monmouth County, New Jersey, and Coroner of Monmouth County, New Jersey and a Monmouth County Freeholder. The family moved to Long Branch in 1862 and Thomas was appointed under sheriff of Monmouth County, serving three years with his father as the sheriff, and two years with his successor, William B. Sutphen.
Joseph E. Cooper		1867 to 1879	Joseph E. Cooper was the first Mayor of Long Branch, New Jersey. Long Branch was incorporated on April 11, 1867, with a commission form of government.

== Gallery ==
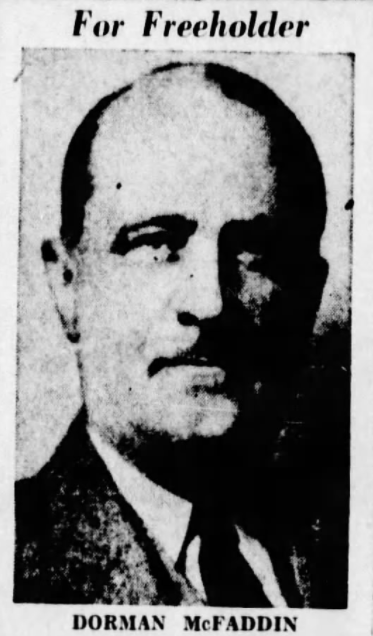
Charles Dorman McFaddin in the Asbury Park Press (August 3, 1939)

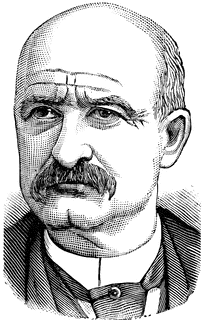
Rufus Blodgett served seven terms as mayor

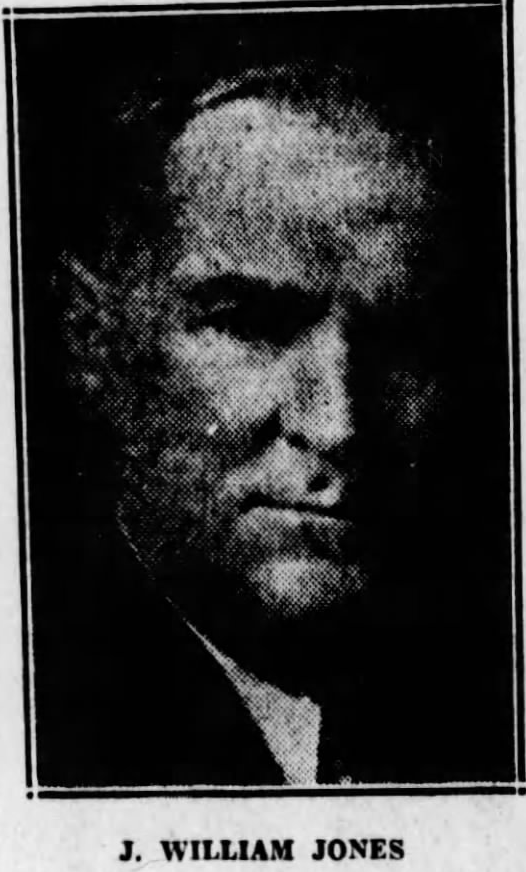
J. William Jones served two terms

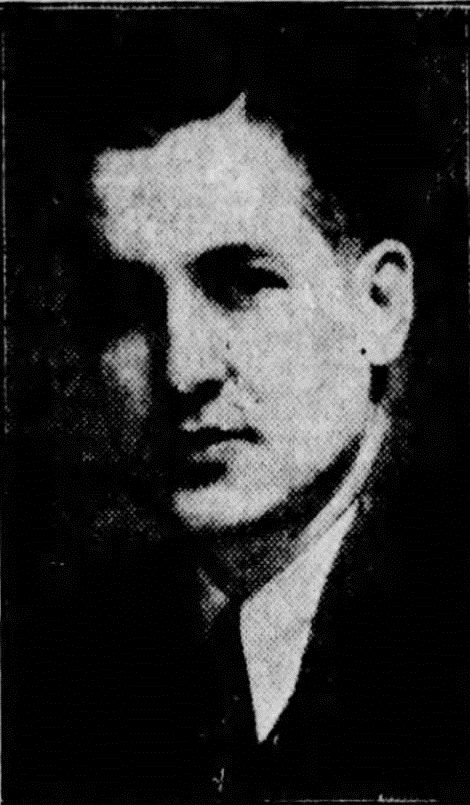
Alton Verran Evans in the Asbury Park Press (May 11, 1936)

== See also ==
- West Long Branch, New Jersey
