= John Haight =

John Haight may refer to:

- John H. Haight (1841–1917), Union Army soldier in the American Civil War
- John T. Haight (1841–1892), American politician from New Jersey
