= Lakewood Terminal =

General information
- Location: 200 1st Street; Lakewood Township, New Jersey; United States
- Coordinates: 40.09145°N 74.21207°W
- Owner: NJ Transit

Construction
- Parking: 92 spaces

History
- Opened: 1950
- Rebuilt: 1989
Location

Lakewood Terminal is a regional bus terminus owned and operated by NJ Transit (NJT) at 1st & Lexington Avenues in Lakewood, New Jersey. Bus service includes routes to Atlantic City, Hudson County, New York, Philadelphia, and points at the Jersey Shore, including those of the Ocean County bus network, Ocean Ride. It is situated near the intersection of Route 88 and U.S. Route 9, a busy commuter corridor and the former Central Railroad of New Jersey right-of-way, where the MOM rail line may eventually travel. There are 92 parking spaces available at the bus station.

== History ==
Lakewood in the late 19th and early 20th century was a winter resort. Train service by what became New Jersey Southern Railroad began in 1860. Between 1929 and 1941 it was served by CNJ's deluxe Blue Comet service. Weekday passenger service ended in 1952 and weekend passenger service in 1957.

The Lincoln Bus Terminal, as the terminal was originally called, was built in 1950 by Lincoln Stages Bus Company with a bus depot later added. The company, which became Lincoln Transit, ran the Atlantic City–New York route and ceased operations in 1983. The terminal was also used by Greyhound Lines and Public Service Coordinated Transport, the latter of which became Transport of New Jersey and was taken over by New Jersey Transit bus operations (NJT) in 1983. A half-million dollar renovation of the facility by NJT was completed in January 1989.

== Services ==
The terminal serves several NJ Transit bus routes, including:

- Route 137: Lakewood to Port Authority Bus Terminal (New York City)
- Route 139: Lakewood to Port Authority Bus Terminal (New York City)
- Route 317: Asbury Park to Philadelphia Greyhound Terminal
- Route 559: Lakewood to Atlantic City Bus Terminal
- Route 67: Toms River to Newark Penn Station

Additionally, Ocean Ride local service is provided on the OC3 Brick / Lakewood / Toms River and OC4 Lakewood – Brick Link routes.

== Future Developments ==
Lakewood has developed an additional multi-modal facility at the northern end of downtown at 9th Street and Clifton, which acts as the hub for the expanding bus network.
