= Lanzaro =

Lanzaro is a surname. Notable people with the surname include:

- Maurizio Lanzaro (born 1982), Italian footballer and coach
- William M. Lanzaro, American politician
