= Joseph Irwin =

Joseph Irwin may refer to:

- Joseph C. Irwin (1904–1987), American politician from New Jersey
- Joseph Oscar Irwin (1898–1982), British statistician
- Joseph Denis Irwin (born 1965), Irish footballer
- Joseph Irwin, who took part in the death of Lucas Leonard
- Joseph Charles Peel Irwin, inventor of babies’ day
