= Freehold Secondary =

Railway line in New Jersey, US

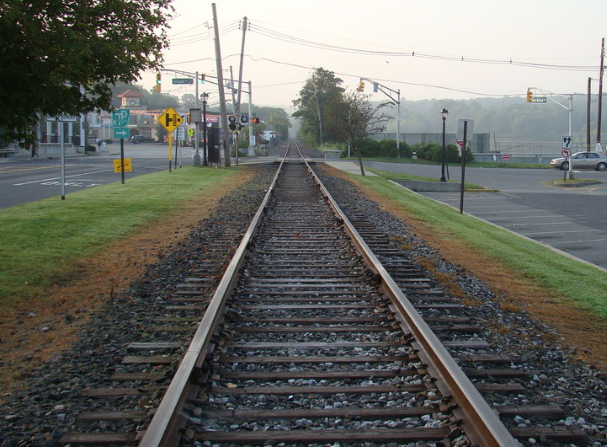
- Jamesburg right-of-way in 2017

Overview
- Other name: Freehold Industrial Track
- Status: Active
- Owner: Conrail Shared Assets Operations
- Locale: Monmouth County, New Jersey

Service
- Type: Freight rail
- System: CSAO
- Operator: Delaware and Raritan River Railroad

History
- Opened: 1853

Technical
- Number of tracks: 1
- Track gauge: 4 ft 8 1/2 in (1,435 mm) standard gauge

The Freehold Secondary (also called the Freehold Industrial Track) is an active rail line in New Jersey, the tracks of which are owned by Conrail Shared Assets Operations (CSAO) and operated by the Delaware and Raritan River Railroad (DRR), a subsidiary of Chesapeake and Delaware, LLC. The active portion operates between Jamesburg and Lakewood, New Jersey. The section between Freehold and the junction with the Southern Secondary in Farmingdale had been dormant since 1999; DRR began track rehabilitation on this section on January 16, 2023. On October 13, 2023, (following a last-spike-driven ceremony in Farmingdale) the 5–mile Farmingdale–Freehold segment was officially reactivated. In total, 25,000+ feet of rail, 12,500 ties (including 8,000 made of sustainable steel) and seven level crossings were replaced in a project that concluded nine months ahead of schedule and under budget. This project makes the operation more efficient, as one train can now serve on-line customers between Browns Yard in Old Bridge, where the train originates, to the line's largest and southernmost customer (Woodhaven Lumber) in Lakewood. DRR intends to grow business with future plans to reactivate dormant track south of Lakewood.

== History ==
=== Construction and early history (1851–1879) ===
The Freehold and Jamesburg Agricultural Railroad was incorporated in 1851 to connect Freehold with the Camden and Amboy Railroad in Jamesburg. The first section between the aforementioned towns was opened to traffic in 1853. In 1868, the line was extended to a connection with the Northeast Corridor (then Camden and Amboy Railroad's main line). On the other end of the line, a firm known as the Squankum and Freehold Marl Company built track from Freehold to Farmingdale in 1868, and leased it to the Freehold and Jamesburg in the same year. The final link in the railroad, between Farmingdale and Sea Girt was built by the Farmingdale and Squan Village Railroad Company which was incorporated on April 3, 1867, and mandated to finish construction of their line by July 1, 1877. Its line was leased to the Freehold and Jamesburg in 1874. Also in 1874, the line between Jamesburg and Monmouth Junction (the connection with the Northeast Corridor) was sold to the Camden and Amboy Railroad.

On May 24, 1879, the three companies were merged to form a new company also called the Freehold and Jamesburg Agricultural Railroad. In the Board of Directors Election held on June 24, 1879, Strickland Kneass was elected president (he had been named president on the merger documents in May, but had not been formally elected by the board until June). Since June 1, 1879, the company's trackage has been operated by the Pennsylvania Railroad.

=== Pennsylvania Railroad/Penn Central operation (1879–1976) ===
Operation continued and prospered under the Pennsylvania Railroad, and both freight and passenger trains used the line up until the Pennsylvania cut its Trenton-Jamesburg-Sea Girt train on May 29, 1962. The line famously hosted dying President Garfield, and his private train as it traveled from Washington, DC, to where he died in Elberon, New Jersey. In 1939, the line hosted the King and Queen of the United Kingdom’s private train, en route to Red Bank, New Jersey. After dieselization, the line's passenger trains were a favorite with railfans because of their use of Doodlebugs, a gas electric car. Freight service continued after the end of passenger service, but in 1964, the section between Sea Girt and Farmingdale was torn up, parts of which became the Edgar Felix Bikeway.

=== Conrail (1976–2022) ===
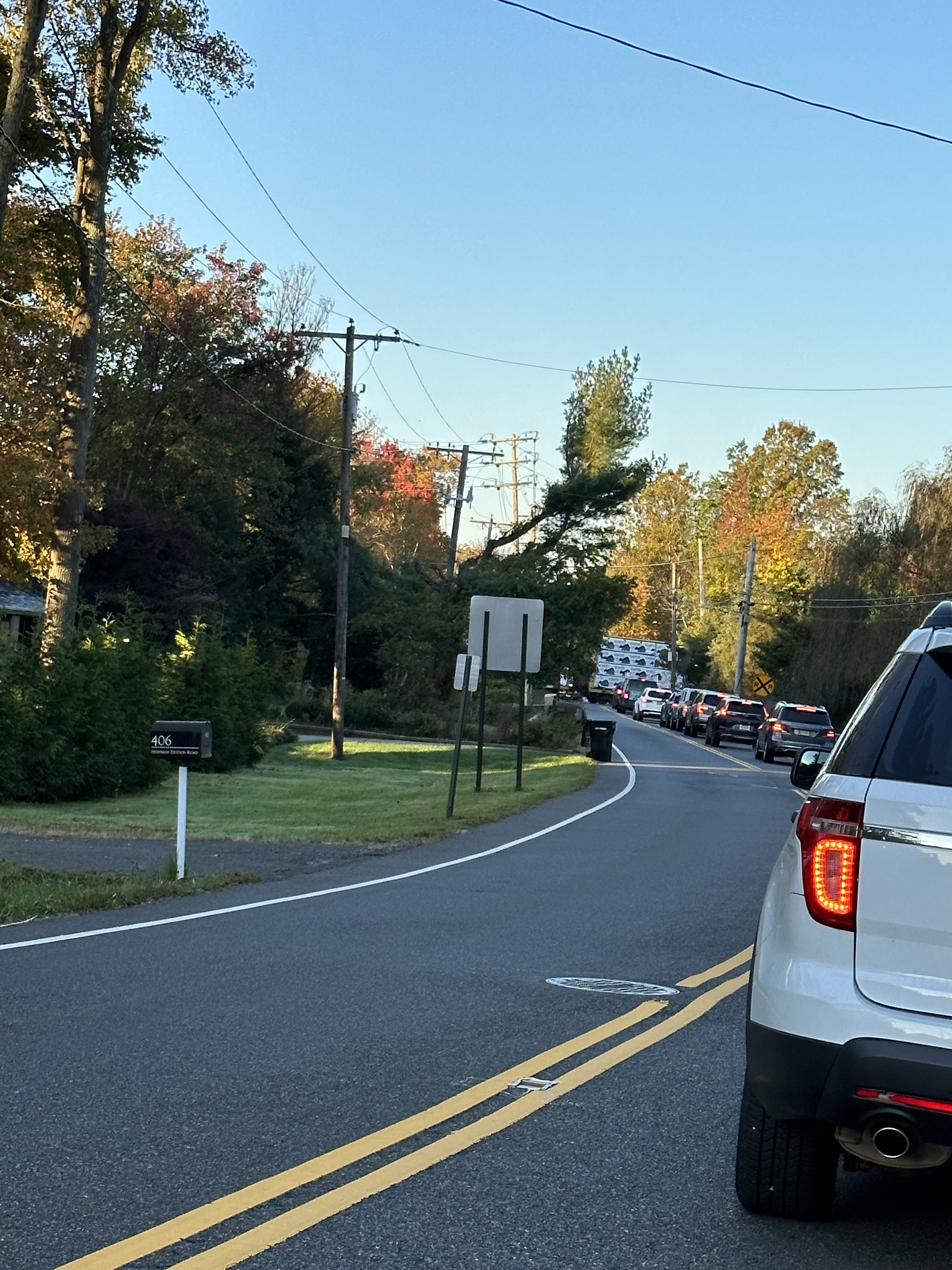
Cars waiting on Hoffman Station Road as a freight train on the Freehold Secondary goes by in Monroe Township, 2023

In 1976, Conrail took over the operations of seven northeastern railroads, including the Penn Central, who operated the line after the 1968 merger of the Pennsylvania and the New York Central Railroad. During consolidation of redundant lines, Conrail did not abandon the remaining portions of the Freehold Secondary, but a 1978 division map marks the section between Freehold and Jamesburg as a "light density line." In the 1999 breakup of Conrail between Norfolk Southern Railway and CSX Transportation, the line went to Conrail Shared Assets (CSAO), a joint switching and terminal railroad created in order to serve the New York, Philadelphia and Detroit markets equally from both carriers. CSAO initially kept the entire line open. Since the early 2000s, there had not been a train east of the Prestone plant in Freehold. In 2022, Chesapeake and Delaware, LLC filed to take over rail service from CSAO on the Southern Secondary and Freehold Secondary, portions of which are owned by CSAO and NJ Transit. CSAO relinquished common carrier operations to the Delaware and Raritan River Railroad effective July 1, 2022. However, CSAO retains trackage rights along the line.

=== Delaware and Raritan River Railroad (2022–present) ===
On October 13th, 2023, the 5-mile stretch between Freehold & Farmingdale was returned to regular freight service. The rehabilitation project allowed the two stub-ended lines (the Southern Secondary & Freehold Secondary) to operate as a single track with direct service from Jamesburg to Lakewood. Supplemental work includes the late 2023 creation of a wye in Farmingdale by adding a southern leg to join the Freehold Secondary's northern curve connecting the Southern Secondary, and ongoing grade crossing upgrades.

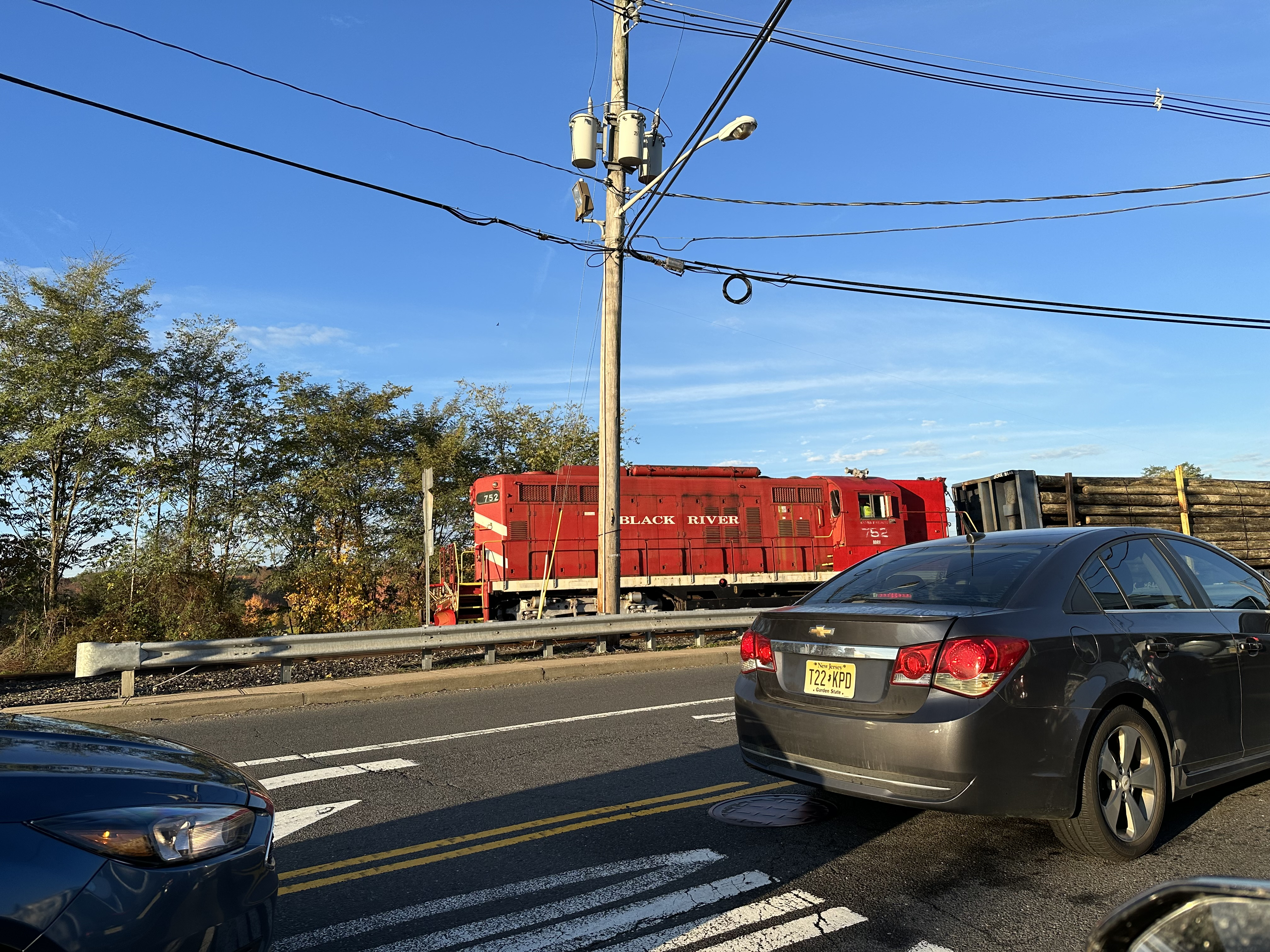
Freight train on the Freehold Secondary in Jamesburg, 2023

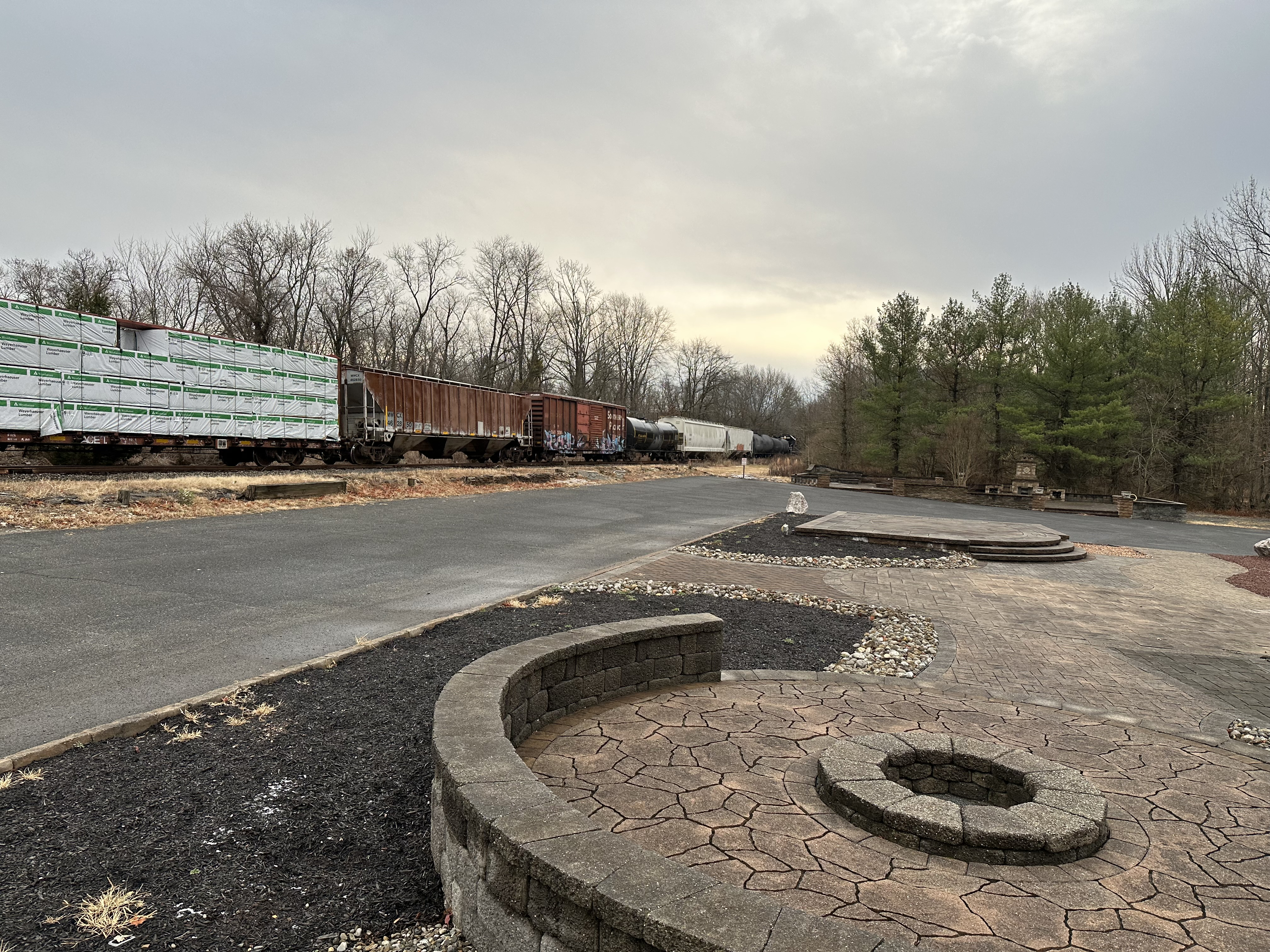
Freight train on the Freehold Secondary in Tennent, Manalapan Township, 2024

== Current operations ==
Conrail Local Freight WPSA-31 (Wayfreight Philadelphia division SAyreville - 31) runs from Browns Yard to Jamesburg to interchange with DRR. From Jamesburg, DRR local JB-01 runs to Freehold to serve the remaining customers on the line: These include:

- S&A Molding, Englishtown, receives wood pellets.
- Reed & Perrine, Tennent, receives fertilizer chemicals.
- Builders General, Freehold, receives lumber.
- Prestone, Freehold, receives plastic pellets and chemicals.
- Beacon Scrap Metal and Iron Company, Freehold, receives empty gondolas and ships out scrap metal (Beacon is currently the D&RR's only customer that ships out product - the rest receive product, & then send back the empty cars.)

== See also ==
- Monmouth Ocean Middlesex Line
