= Delaware and Raritan River Railroad =

Railroad in New Jersey

- Map Map of DRR lines, leased and operated

Overview
- Parent company: Chesapeake and Delaware, LLC
- Headquarters: Ringoes, New Jersey
- Reporting mark: DRR
- Locale: Central Jersey
- Dates of operation: 2022–present

Technical
- Track gauge: 4 ft 8 1/2 in (1,435 mm) standard gauge
- Length: 50 miles (80 km)

Other
- Website: https://www.cadrailroads.com/

The Delaware and Raritan River Railroad (reporting mark DRR) is a short-line railroad that operates 2 lines in central New Jersey. The Southern Secondary runs from an interchange with Conrail Shared Assets Operations (CSAO) at Red Bank south to Lakewood. The Freehold Secondary runs from an interchange with CSAO at Jamesburg southeast to Farmingdale. Delaware and Raritan River Railroad is a subsidiary of Chesapeake and Delaware, LLC.

== History ==
In 2022, Chesapeake and Delaware, LLC filed to take over freight service from CSAO on the Southern Secondary and Freehold Secondary. Portions of the lines are owned by CSAO and NJ Transit. Delaware and Raritan River Railroad began operations on July 1, 2022.

Between January 16, 2023, and September 15, 2023, a previously dormant segment between Freehold and Farmingdale was rebuilt, including installation of approximately 25,000 feet of rail, 12,500 ties, plus work at seven grade crossings. A test train operated on the rebuilt segment on September 15, 2023. Following a spike-driving ceremony in Farmingdale on October 13, 2023, the segment opened for freight service.

The railroad has stated plans to pursue additional restoration south of Lakewood toward Lakehurst, contingent on further track work plus shipper demand.

== Farmingdale wye ==
A wye was constructed at Farmingdale, including a new grade crossing on Preventorium Road. Installation occurred during the week of December 4, 2023. The connecting track between Southard Avenue and Preventorium Road is approximately 1,600 feet (490 m). The wye enables through freight movements between Jamesburg and Lakewood without a reverse move at Farmingdale, reducing switching complexity for line-wide service.

== Operations ==
CSAO interchange points are located at Red Bank (Southern Secondary) and Jamesburg (Freehold Secondary). Freight movements on the Southern Secondary interface with North Jersey Coast Line passenger operations near Red Bank and farther south toward Bay Head.

== Lines ==
- Southern Secondary
- Freehold Secondary
