= List of Central Railroad of New Jersey precursors =

These railroads were bought, leased, or in other ways had their track come under ownership or lease by the Central Railroad of New Jersey.

The Central Railroad of New Jersey was consolidated into Conrail.

The Allentown Terminal Railroad, Bay Shore Connecting Railroad, Beaver Meadow, Trescow and New Boston Railroad, New York and Long Branch Railroad and Raritan River Railroad were partly owned by the CNJ.

- American Dock and Improvement Company
- Bayonne Port Terminal
- Buena Vista Railroad
- Carteret Extension Railroad
- Carteret and Sewaren Railroad
- Central Railroad of Pennsylvania
  - Easton and Western Railroad
- Constable's Hook Railroad
- Cumberland and Maurice River Railroad
  - Bridgeton and Port Norris Railroad (succeeded November 30, 1878)
- Cumberland and Maurice River Extension Railroad
- Dover and Rockaway Railroad (leased April 26, 1881)
- Elizabeth Extension Railroad
- Freehold and Atlantic Highlands Railroad
  - Atlantic Highlands Railroad
  - Freehold and New York Railway (consolidated January 8, 1890?)
    - Monmouth County Agricultural Railroad
  - Keyport Railroad (consolidated January 8, 1890?)
- Hibernia Mine Railroad (leased September 30, 1910)
- High Bridge Railroad (leased)
  - Taylor Iron Works
- Lafayette Railroad
- Lake Hopatcong Railroad
- Lehigh and Wilkes-Barre Coal Company
- Long Valley Railroad
- Longwood Valley Railroad
- Manufacturers' Railroad
- Manufacturers' Extension Railroad
- Mauch Chunk, Summit Hill and Switchback Railway
  - Mauch Chunk Switch-Back Railway
- Middle Brook Railroad
- Middle Valley Railroad
- Mount Hope Mineral Railroad (bought February 1930)
- Navesink Railroad
- New Jersey Southern Railway
  - New Jersey Southern Railroad
    - Kent County Railroad (leased) (later reassigned to PRR)
    - Long Branch and Sea-Shore Railway (leased)
    - Maryland and Delaware Railroad (leased) (later reassigned to PRR)
    - Pemberton and New York Railroad (leased) (later reassigned to PRR)
    - Raritan and Delaware Bay Railroad (succeeded September 14, 1869)
    - Toms River Railroad (leased)
    - Toms River and Waretown Railroad (leased)
    - Vineland Railway (leased)
      - Vineland Railroad (succeeded March 30, 1877)
- New Jersey Terminal Railroad
- Newark and Elizabeth Railroad
- Newark and New York Railroad
- Newark Warehouse Company
- Ogden Mine Railroad (leased January 1, 1882)
- Passaic River Extension Railroad
- Perth Amboy and Elizabethport Railroad (consolidated 1873)
- Raritan North Shore Railroad
- Somerville and Easton Railroad (consolidated February 22, 1849?)
  - Elizabeth and Somerville Railroad (consolidated February 26, 1847?)
- Sound Shore Railroad
- South Branch Railroad
- Toms River and Barnegat Railroad
- Vineland Branch Railway
- West End Railroad
- West Side Connecting Railroad
- Wharton and Northern Railroad (bought February 1930)
  - Hibernia Branch Railroad (consolidated December 7, 1905)
  - Morris County Railroad (consolidated December 7, 1905)
    - Charlotteburg and Green Lake Railroad (bought 1888)
      - Green Pond Railroad (succeeded August 17, 1876)
  - Morris County Connecting Railroad (consolidated December 7, 1905)
  - Port Oram Railroad (consolidated December 7, 1905)
- Wilkes-Barre and Scranton Railway (leased May 1, 1888)
