= Wheatland, New Jersey =

Populated place in Ocean County, New Jersey, US

- Unincorporated community
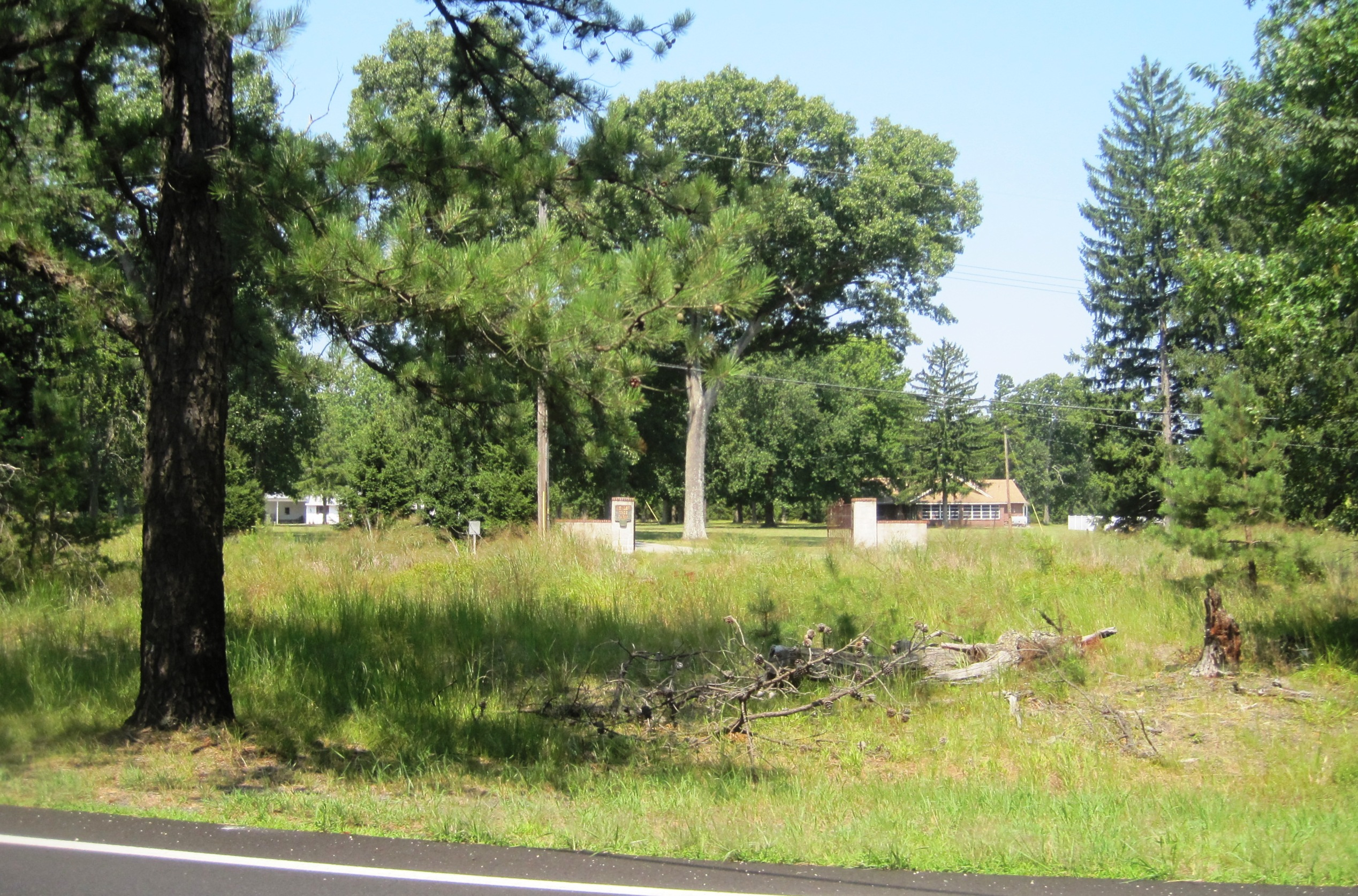
- Settlement as seen from Pasadena Road

- Location within Ocean County (Inset: Ocean County in New Jersey) Wheatland, New Jersey (New Jersey) Wheatland, New Jersey (the United States)
- Coordinates: 39°53′42″N 74°26′02″W
- Country: United States
- State: New Jersey
- County: Ocean
- Township: Manchester
- Elevation: 148 ft (45 m)
- Time zone: UTC−05:00 (Eastern (EST))
  - Summer (DST): UTC−04:00 (EDT)
- GNIS feature ID: 881766

Wheatland (also called Pasadena) is an unincorporated community within Manchester Township in Ocean County, in the U.S. state of New Jersey.

Wheatland is located approximately four miles (6.4 km) southwest of Whiting, along a now-abandoned line of the New Jersey Southern Railroad.

The Pasadena Wildlife Management Area is located east of the settlement.

== History ==
Sand—mined from nearby pits—was used to manufacture clay drain pipes at a factory erected at Wheatland during the 1870s.

In 1882, Wheatland had a post office, and a population of 125.
