= Harry Larrison Jr. =

American politician

Freehold Director of Monmouth County
- In office 1986 – December 2, 2004
- Preceded by: Thomas J. Lynch Jr.
- Succeeded by: Thomas J. Powers
- In office 1981–1983
- Preceded by: Ray Kramer
- Succeeded by: Thomas J. Lynch Jr.
- In office 1977–1978
- Preceded by: Ray Kramer
- Succeeded by: Ray Kramer

Member of the Monmouth County Board of Chosen Freeholders
- In office February 12, 1966 – December 2, 2004
- Preceded by: Charles I. Smith

Personal details
- Born: May 28, 1926 Neptune Township, New Jersey, US
- Died: May 29, 2005 (aged 79)
- Party: Republican
- Education: Neptune High School

Harry Larrison Jr. (May 28, 1926 – May 29, 2005) was an American Republican Party politician, who served on the Monmouth County Board of Chosen Freeholders from February 12, 1966, to December 2, 2004. The nearly 39 years that Larrison served marked the longest tenure of a Freeholder in New Jersey history.

== Biography ==
Freeholder Larrison was born in Neptune Township to Harry Larrison Sr. and Dorothy Brown Larrison; he attended local schools, graduating from Neptune High School in 1945. In 1946 he joined the Ocean Grove Fire Department, where he would later serve as chief. In 1956 he was appointed to the Neptune Township Housing Authority and in 1960 Larrison was appointed to a vacancy on the Neptune Township Committee.

On February 12, 1966, Larrison was appointed to a vacancy on the Board of Chosen Freeholders caused by the resignation of Charles I. Smith; in November of that year he was elected to the first of 13 consecutive three-year terms. He would continuously serve as a freeholder until December 2, 2004, when he resigned due to failing health.

Freeholder Larrison served as director in 1977–1978, from 1981 to 1983, and again from 1986 to 2004.

On April 27, 2005, Larrison was charged by federal prosecutors with accepting $8,500 in bribes to help developers gain approval for their projects, but died before the case was heard.

Larrison died at age 79 of cancer on May 29, 2005, at Jersey Shore University Medical Center.

== See also ==
- List of Monmouth County Freeholder Directors

Political offices
Preceded by Ray Kramer	Monmouth County Freeholder Director; 1977–1978	Succeeded by Ray Kramer
Preceded by Ray Kramer	Monmouth County Freeholder Director; 1981–1983	Succeeded by Thomas J. Lynch Jr.
Preceded by Thomas J. Lynch Jr.	Monmouth County Freeholder Director; 1986–2004	Succeeded by Thomas J. Powers
