= List of sheriffs of Monmouth County, New Jersey =

Monmouth County, New Jersey has had sheriffs since colonial era, when it was part of East Jersey and later was the Province of New Jersey.

After the Dutch surrender of New Netherland, Colonel Richard Nicolls, an English military officer, was authorized to establish the Monmouth Tract, which he did on April 8, 1665, and instituted a legal system centered on English common law During a brief period of control by the Dutch in 1673, a sheriff would be known as a schout.

"An Act to Appoint Sheriffs", was approved by the Legislature of East New Jersey on March 1, 1682. Terms were for a single year with a maximum of three consecutive terms.

Pursuant to Article VII Section II of the 1947 New Jersey State Constitution, each county in New Jersey is required to have three elected administrative officials known as "constitutional officers": the County Clerk, the County Surrogate (both elected for a five-year term) and the County Sheriff (elected for a three-year term). There are no term limits.

Shaun Golden has been the 76th Sheriff of Monmouth County since 2010. 1960 Morris J Woodring

== Royal sheriffs (pre 1776) ==
Royal sheriffs during colonial era:

Order	Term	Sheriff	Notes
01	1683	Eliakim Wardell	First Royal Sheriff. He was appointed by Deputy Governor Thomas Rudyard; served from May 31, 1683, to November 1684. Prior to his appointment Lewis Morris Jr. was appointed to the position but declined to serve. Richard Hartshorne was then appointed and he also declined. Wardell was the third choice.
02	1684	Robert Hamilton	
	1696 to 1699	Samuel Foreman	
	1699	Daniel Hendrickson	First New Netherlander to be appointed, namesake of Hendrickson Corners, New Jersey
	1700	John Stewart	
	1715	Gideon Crawford	
	1722 to 1727	William Nicholls	
	c. 1756	Daniel Van Maater	
	1760 to 1762	John Taylor	
	1775	Elisha Lawrence	Last Royal Sheriff. Elisha Lawrence (1746 – July 23, 1799) was an American Federalist Party politician, who represented Monmouth County in the New Jersey Legislative Council, the precursor to the New Jersey State Senate, from 1780 through 1783, from 1789 through 1792 and in 1795. He served as vice-president of Council from 1789 through 1792, and again in 1795.

== State of New Jersey (1776-1946) ==
The sheriffs were:

Order	Term	Sheriff	Notes
01	1776	Nicholas Van Brunt	First Sheriff of Monmouth County after independence.
02	1779	David Forman	
03	1782-1784	John Burrowes Jr.	
04	1785	David Ehea	
05	1788-89	Daniel Hendrickson	
06	1790	Elisha Walton	
07	1793	William Lloyd	
08	1796	James Lloyd	
09	1799	Samuel P. Formam	
10	1802	Elisha Walton	
11	1805	James Lloyd	
12	1808	David Craig	
13	1811	Lewis Gordon	
14	1814	Charles Parker	
15	1817	John J. Ely	(April 7, 1778 – January 11, 1852) This was his first term. He served as the Director of the Monmouth County, New Jersey Board of Chosen Freeholders and as a member of the New Jersey General Assembly. His son, Horatio Ely, would later serve as sheriff.
16	1820	James Lloyd	
17	1823	Richard Lloyd	
18	1825	John J. Ely	This was his second term.
19	1828	Daniel Holmes	
20	1831	John M. Perrine	
21	1834	Thomas Miller	
22	1837	Horatio Ely	
23	1838	Abraham G. Neafie	
24	1841	Charles Allen	
25	1844	Holmes Conover	
26	1847	Samuel Conover	
27	1850	John C. Cox	
28	1853	Holmes Conover	
29	1856	Samuel Conover	
30	1859	Joseph I. Thompson	
31	1862	Jordan Woolley	His son was the Mayor of Long Branch, New Jersey.
32	1865	William B. Sutphin	
33	1868	John H. Patterson	
34	1871	Samuel T. Hendrickson	
35	1874	George W. Brown	
36	1878	Charles Allen	
37	1881	John L. Thompson	
38	1884	Theodore Aumack	
39	1887	Theodore Fields	He served from 1887 to 1890. He was born near Eatonown and educated at Ocean Hill Institute in Long Branch. He went into the hotel business purchasing Osborn House (New Jersey) in Avon-by-the-Sea and Manasquan (then known as Swuan), before locating in Wall Township before returning to farming. He was a founder of the Bonnat Club, a hunting and fishing society. On May 14, 1884, Fields was chosen as Director of the Monmouth County, New Jersey Board of Chosen Freeholders and served for three years. Fields was appointed to the unexpired term of Freeholder Samuel M. Gifford, who had died in office, and served on the board until May 1, 1887. After leaving the Board of Chosen Freeholders, Fields was nominated as the 1887 Democratic candidate for sheriff, and was elected to a three-year term in the general election. While sheriff, Fields relocated to Freehold, the county seat. He is the father Houston Fields (Shriff,1896 to 1899).
40	1891	Ruliff P. Smock	This is his first term.
41	1893	Matthias Woolley	He served from 1893 to 1895. Matthias Woolley was the first Republican Sheriff of Monmouth County. He moved to Freehold, New Jersey and hired Houston Fields as his deputy sheriff and John A. Howland as his confidential clerk. He served as a member of the board of education of the Long Branch Public Schools for 16 years and was the district's treasurer for six years.
42	1896	Houston Fields	He served from 1896 to 1899. Fields was born on October 23, 1861, near Eatontown, New Jersey. He was educated in the Manasquan Public Schools, at the Freehold Institute, and in the Long Branch Public Schools. He was admitted to the bar in June 1894, and as a Master in Chancery in 1896. After working for five years for the Pennsylvania Railroad, Houston Fields was appointed in 1887 as Under Sheriff and warden of the county jail by his father, Sheriff Theodore Fields. He would continue to serve under sheriffs of both parties before being elected to a three-year term as sheriff in 1896. Houston Fields was active in many Masonic and fraternal organizations in Monmouth County.
43	1899	Ruliff P. Smock	This is his second term.
44	1899	Obadiah E. Davis	This was his first term.
44	1899	Obadiah C. Bogardus	He was a dentist in Keyport, New Jersey. He was elected sheriff of Monmouth County in 1902 and Mayor of Keyport, New Jersey from 1917 to 1920 and again in 1935.
	1902 to 1905	Obadiah E.Davis	This was his second term.
	1905	Charles Asa Francis	
	1905	Charles E. Close	
	1908	Clarence E. F. Hetrick	
	1911	Wilbert A. Beecroft	
	1914	Cornelius B. Barkalow	This was his first term.
	1917	Elmer Hendrickson Geran	Member of the Democratic Party. He was born on October 24, 1875, he represented New Jersey's 3rd congressional district from 1923 to 1925. He died on January 12, 1954.
	1918	Cornelius B. Barkalow	This was his second term.
	1920	Elmer Hendrickson Geran	
	1920	Walter H. Gravatt	
	1920	John H. Van Mater	
	1921 to 1925		
	1926	Narry N. Johnson	
	1929	William R. O’Brien	
	1932	Howard Height	
	1935	George H. Robert	
	1938	Morris J. Woodring	
	1941	John T. Lawley	
	1941–1944	Morris J. Woodring	

== State of New Jersey (post-1947 constitution) ==
Order	Term	Sheriff	Notes
	1947; 1949–1951; 1953; 1956–1962	Ira Ellsworth Wolcott	(1883-1963)
71	1962–1965	Joseph A. Shafto	
72	1965	Paul Kiernan	He served from 1965 to 1980, for five terms and also served as the Mayor of Long Branch.
73	1980	William M. Lanzaro	Served from 1980 to 1995, for five terms. Lanzaro grew up in the Morganville section of Marlboro Township and attended the Marlboro Public Schools and Matawan Regional High School. He later moved to Matawan, where he ran a car dealership. He became involved in the Matawan Republican Party, eventually becoming its chairman, and ran the successful 1970 campaign of Lillian G. Burry for borough council. In 1977, Lanzaro unsuccessfully challenged longtime Democratic incumbent sheriff Paul Kiernan, but defeated Kiernan in a 1980 rematch. Lanzaro, who campaigned on the issue that he would be a full-time sheriff, would go on to serve five terms himself. Soon after taking office, Lanzaro was faced with a protest by inmates at the Monmouth County Correctional Institution who were demanding more privileges. A federal judge ruled that conditions amounted to punishment. During Lanzaro's tenure, the Sheriff's Office participated in the Ident-a-Kid program. In "Pay or stay" sweeps, parents delinquent in their child support payments were arrested and held until payment was made. By 1995, Lanzaro had had a falling out with county political leaders and was denied the Republican organization's endorsement for reelection. He challenged the organization-backed candidate, Joseph W. Oxley, in the Republican primary and lost. Afterward, he retired from political activity.
74	1996	Joseph W. Oxley	He served from 1996 to 2007.
75	2008	Kim Guadagno	She served from January 1, 2008, to January 19, 2010.
76	2010	Shaun Golden	76th Sheriff of Monmouth County He holds a master's degree in administration from Seton Hall University. He has been a resident of Farmingdale. Golden is a New Jersey Certified Public Manager and an adjunct professor at Monmouth University in the Department of Political Science and Public Policy. Shaun Golden is a brother of Al Golden, head football coach at the University of Miami.
