= Bryant B. Newcomb =

American Republican Party politician

Mayor of Long Branch, New Jersey
- In office 1912–1916

Elected Member of the Board of Chosen Freeholders of Monmouth County
- In office 1918–1921

Director of the Monmouth County, New Jersey Board of Chosen Freeholders
- In office 1921–1933
- Preceded by: William M. Bergen
- Succeeded by: Frederic P. Reichey

Personal details
- Born: Bryant Baxter Newcomb; August 23, 1867 Landis Township, New Jersey
- Died: February 1, 1945 (aged 77) Long Branch, New Jersey
- Party: Republican
- Spouse(s): Selena Warwick (died 1897); Viola M. Warwick (died 1936)

Bryant Baxter Newcomb (August 22, 1867 – February 1, 1945) was an American Republican Party politician, who served as the Mayor of Long Branch, New Jersey, and served as the Director of the Monmouth County Board of Chosen Freeholders. He was director of the Long Branch Building and Loan Association. He was the business manager for the Monmouth County Publishing Company that published the Daily Record.

== Early life ==
Bowman was born in Landis Township, New Jersey, to Franklin and Caroline Newcombe. His family moved to Long Branch where Franklin worked as a contractor. Bryant attended city primary and secondary schools. He then worked as a bookkeeper and confidential secretary at Bayley and Burns, where he stayed for 18 years.

== Career ==
He served as the Long Branch, New Jersey City Clerk from 1902-1912 before being elected to the City Commission, where he was chosen to serve as Mayor for the years 1912 through 1916. He was the first mayor elected under the commission form of government, a form created by the 1911 Walsh Act. Newcomb was an advocate of the form. In 1913, a recall campaign was instigated against Newcomb and two city commissioners. In 1915, Newcomb organized mayors and prominent property owners along the New Jersey Short to create a coast protection league, of which he was made president. The group sought to organize support in state and national legislation for improved coastal management. After his term, he moved to New York City, where he worked with the banking and brokerage firm of John Nickerson, Jr. He then moved back to Long Branch where he became manager of F. M. Taylor Publishing Co. (Later the Monmouth County Publishing Co.), publishers of the Long Branch Record.

Newcomb was elected to the Board of Chosen Freeholders in the 1918 general election, and served five three year terms. He served as Director of the Board from 1921 through 1933. In the early 1920s, he became president and director of the Long Branch Building and Loan Association, where he worked for 20 years.

Bryant B. Newcomb's tenure on the Board of Freeholders coincided with the increased use of the automobile during the 1920s, and millions of dollars were invested in the county's infrastructure during this time. Newcomb was chairman of the roads committee which supervised construction of $2 million worth of county roads. He also served on the finance committee, bridge committee, jail committee, and surplus fund committee.

In 1933, Newcomb and his running mate, Arthur Johnson, were defeated by Democrats Arthur Pryor and Henry W. Herbert.

After leaving the board, Newcomb retired from politics, remaining in the newspaper business until retiring in 1937. He returned to the paper as business manager emeritus in 1940.

Newcomb also worked as a firefighter with the Atlantic and Independent Fire Companies of the Long Branch Fire Department.

== Personal life ==
Newcomb was married twice. First to Selena Warwick with whom he had three children: Franklin T., Selena W., and Bryant B. Jr. He later married her sister, Viola M. Warwick with whom he had two sons: W. Howard and Thomas W. His second wife died on February 12, 1936.

He died on February 1, 1945, at Monmouth Memorial Hospital from injuries sustained from being struck by a taxicab.

== See also ==
- List of Monmouth County Freeholder Directors

== Notes and references ==
Political offices
Preceded by William M. Bergen	Monmouth County Freeholder Director; 1921-1933	Succeeded by Frederic P. Reichey
