= Rufus Blodgett =

American politician

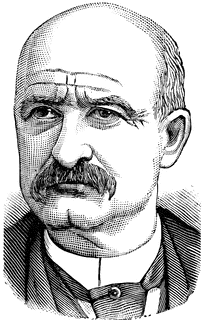

United States Senator from New Jersey
- In office March 4, 1887 – March 3, 1893
- Preceded by: William J. Sewell
- Succeeded by: James Smith Jr.

Mayor of Long Branch, New Jersey
- In office 1893–1898

Personal details
- Born: October 9, 1834 Dorchester, New Hampshire, U.S.
- Died: October 3, 1910 (aged 75) Long Branch, New Jersey, U.S.
- Party: Democratic

Rufus Blodgett (October 9, 1834 – October 3, 1910) was a United States senator from New Jersey and Superintendent of the New York & Long Branch Railroad for 25 years. He served as the Mayor of Long Branch, New Jersey on five occasions.

He was the only person in either house of Congress to vote against the Sherman Antitrust Act.

U.S. Senate
Preceded by William J. Sewell	U.S. senator (Class 1) from New Jersey; 1887–1893; Served alongside: John R. McPherson	Succeeded by James Smith Jr.
