= Kim Guadagno =

Lieutenant Governor of New Jersey from 2010 to 2018

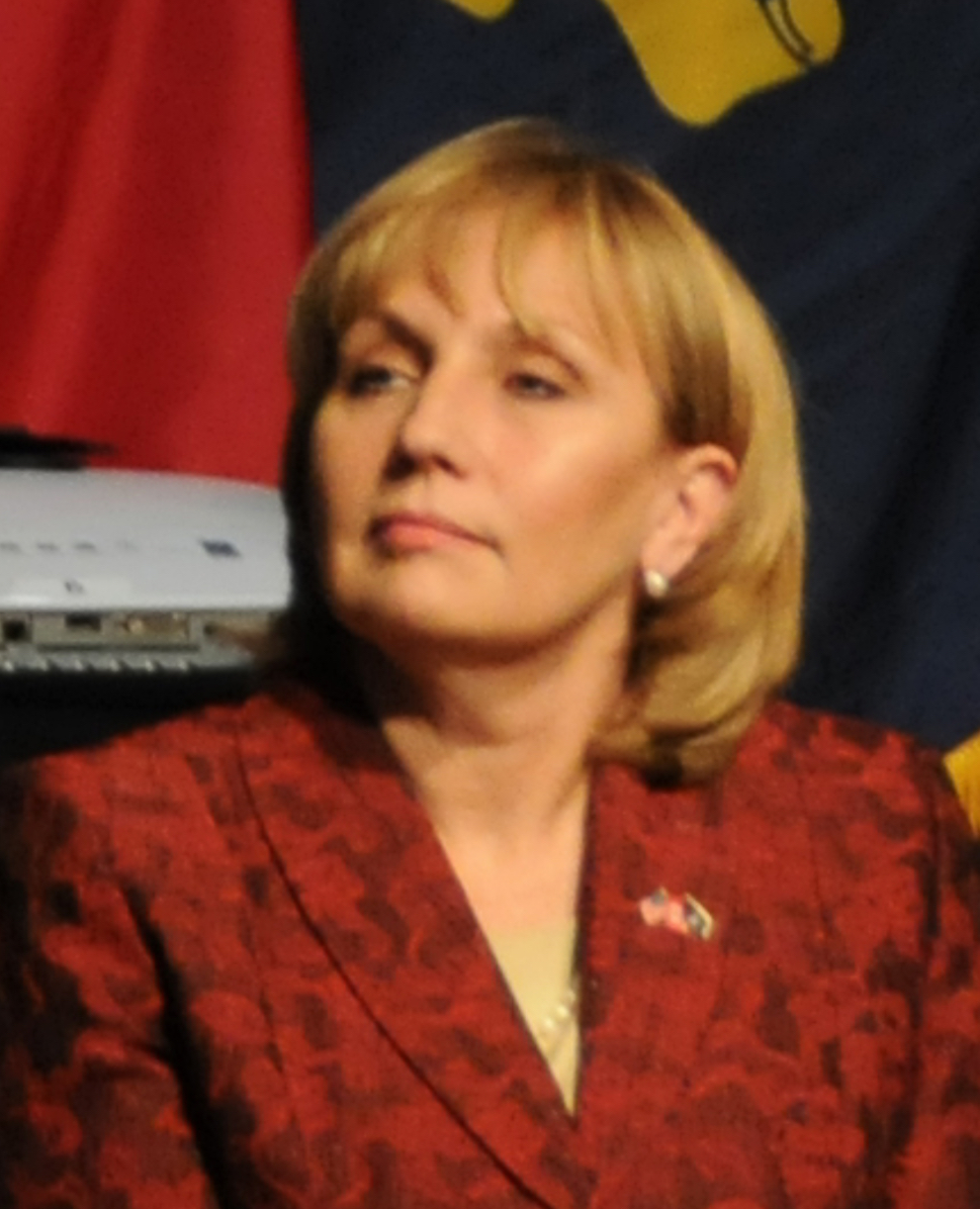
- Guadagno in 2017

1st Lieutenant Governor of New Jersey
- In office January 19, 2010 – January 16, 2018
- Governor: Chris Christie
- Preceded by: Position established
- Succeeded by: Sheila Oliver

33rd Secretary of State of New Jersey
- In office January 19, 2010 – January 16, 2018
- Governor: Chris Christie
- Preceded by: Nina Wells
- Succeeded by: Tahesha Way

75th Sheriff of Monmouth County, New Jersey
- In office January 1, 2008 – January 19, 2010
- Preceded by: Joseph Oxley
- Succeeded by: Shaun Golden

Personal details
- Born: Kimberly Ann McFadden; April 13, 1959 (age 67) Waterloo, Iowa, U.S.
- Party: Republican (until 2021); Independent (2021–present)
- Spouse: Michael Guadagno (m. 1991)
- Children: 3
- Education: Ursinus College (BA); American University (JD)

Kimberly Ann Guadagno (Italian pronunciation: [ɡwaˈdaɲɲo]; née McFadden; born April 13, 1959) is an American lawyer and politician who served as the first lieutenant governor and 33rd secretary of state of New Jersey from 2010 to 2018.

Guadagno was the Republican nominee for Governor of New Jersey in 2017, but lost in the general election to Democrat Phil Murphy.

As of 2026, Guadagno is currently the only Republican to have served as the lieutenant governor of New Jersey, as well as the only white person to have served in that office.

== Early life and education ==
Kim Guadagno was born Kimberly Ann McFadden in Waterloo, Iowa, the middle child of five of Mary Patricia "Pat" (Blevens) and Charles A. "Chuck" McFadden Jr. Her father's job in sales had her living in many different places prior to going to college. She earned a Bachelor of Arts degree from Ursinus College in Collegeville, Pennsylvania in 1980, and a J.D. degree in 1983 from the Washington College of Law in Washington, D.C.

== Career ==
=== Early legal work ===
Kim Guadagno is a former assistant United States attorney for the Eastern District of New York and the District of New Jersey. She was also assistant New Jersey attorney general. Serving as deputy chief of the U.S. attorney's office's corruption unit from 1994 to 1998, Guadagno was responsible for the corruption prosecutions of former Essex County Executive Thomas D'Alessio (a Democrat) and of Somerset County Prosecutor Nicholas Bissell (a Republican). In 1994, in a case involving an executive of lottery contractor GTECH Corporation, the U.S. Attorney's Office was criticized by the judge overseeing the case for the disclosure of grand jury testimony in a sentencing report; the issue was never referred for further ethical or legal investigation. The lottery executive went to jail. The D'Alessio and Bissell cases were each recognized as one of the top federal prosecutions in the country at the time by the US Department of Justice.

She served as deputy director from 1998 to 2001 in the Division of Criminal Justice, where she supervised prosecutions of a $40 million financial fraud and of David L. Smith, creator of the "Melissa" computer worm. She taught legal research and writing at Rutgers School of Law–Newark from 2003 until November 2009. In 2005 Kim Guadagno was elected to Monmouth Beach's non-partisan governing body as one of its three Walsh Act commissioners.

=== Monmouth County sheriff ===
Elected the 75th sheriff of Monmouth County in 2007, succeeding Joseph Oxley, she became the first woman to serve in the post when she took office in 2008.

Guadagno served as the chief executive and administrative officer of Monmouth County's largest law enforcement agency with nearly 700 employees who serve in the Law Enforcement Division, the 1,328 bed maximum security correctional institution, the youth detention center, the Civil Division and the Public Safety and 911 Emergency Dispatch Center. During her time as sheriff, the office received the Department of Defense Pro Patria Award which recognizes employers for their extraordinary support of employees who serve in the National Guard and Reserve. Under her supervision, the office also received the "Six Star" simultaneous accreditation of the law enforcement division, the correctional facility, correctional healthcare and youth detention center from the Commission on Accreditation for Law Enforcement Agencies, Inc. The Monmouth County Sheriff's Office was the first out of 3,088 sheriff's offices in the United States to receive the award. The department was one of 11 accepted nationwide into the federal program established under Immigration and Nationality Act Section 287(g) which allowed corrections officers to check the immigration status of prisoners before they were released.

Sheriff Guadagno also expanded "Project Lifesaver," which uses bracelets with a radio-tracking device that allows sheriff's officers to locate persons with Alzheimer's disease or autism who wander or become lost.

=== Lieutenant Governor and Secretary of State ===
On July 20, 2009, Republican gubernatorial nominee Chris Christie chose Guadagno as his running mate, in the first New Jersey election to include voting for a lieutenant governor. Guadagno was selected over a number of other Republican women, including state senator Diane Allen and Bergen County clerk Kathleen Donovan. Guadagno was not a well known political figure statewide in October 2009. According to Fairleigh Dickinson University's PublicMind Poll, Guadagno's name recognition in New Jersey was low with only 15% of voters reporting that they were aware of her. Out of the New Jersey voters that knew of Guadagno, 4% reported having a "very favorable" or "somewhat favorable" opinion while 3% reported that they had a "very unfavorable" or "somewhat unfavorable" opinion of the prospective lieutenant governor. Christie and Guadagno defeated Jon Corzine and Loretta Weinberg on November 3, 2009.

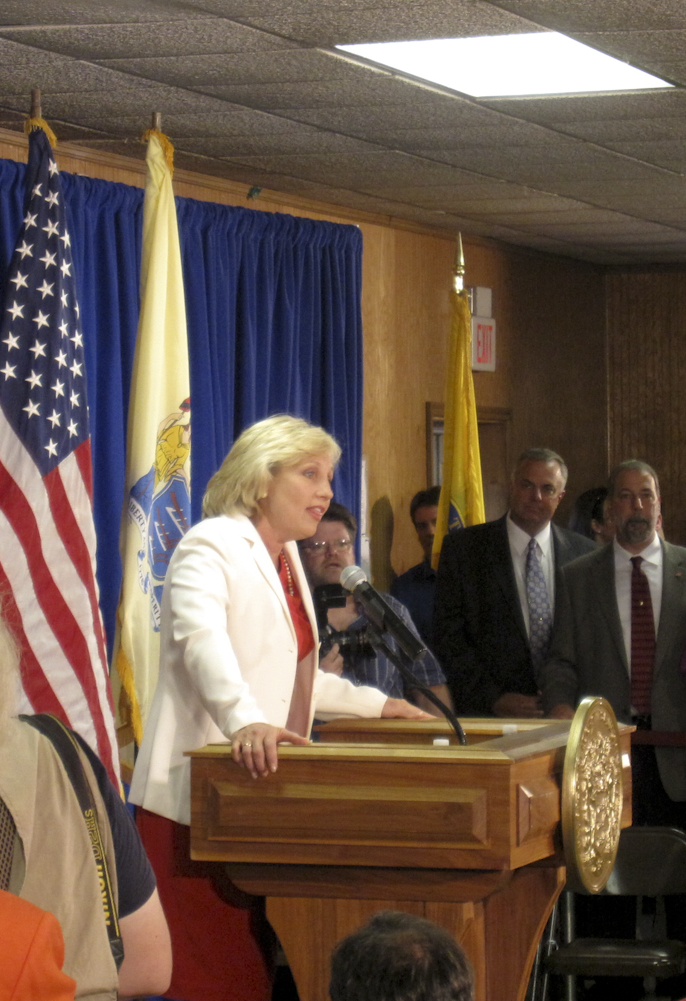
Guadagno in 2010

Christie also appointed Guadagno New Jersey's secretary of state and charged her with overseeing economic development efforts and the streamlining of government regulations. She was sworn in on January 19, 2010 as lieutenant governor of New Jersey.

As the secretary of state, Guadagno was responsible for overseeing artistic, cultural, and historical programs within New Jersey, as well as volunteerism and community service projects within the state. She supervised multiple programs, including the State Archives, the state's research facility and repository for public records of historical value and the Division of Travel and Tourism, which is charged with promoting New Jersey as a premier travel destination.

Additionally, Guadagno headed the Division of Elections and served as the chief elections official and chair of the Board of State Canvassers, which certifies election results for federal and state office elections and public questions. She oversaw the Division of Programs which includes the Governor's Office of Volunteerism, the New Jersey Commission on National and Community Service, the Office of Faith Based Initiatives and the Center for Hispanic Policy, Research, and Development.

== Candidacy for governor ==
Kim Guadagno was the 2017 Republican gubernatorial nominee, having won approximately 46.8% of the popular vote in the June 2017 statewide primary. She lost to Democrat Phil Murphy on November 7, 2017, garnering 42% to Murphy's 56%.

== Post-political career ==
In April 2018, Guadagno joined law firm Connell Foley as a partner working out of its Jersey City office.

In May 2019, Guadagno became CEO and president of Fulfill NJ (formerly known as The Foodbank of Monmouth and Ocean County). During her two-year tenure at the foodbank, Guadagno closed a $1.5 million budget gap and managed a food delivery system during the COVID crisis. Her contract with the FoodBank was not renewed in May 2021 amid disputes with Monmouth County officials, including Shaun Golden, the chair of the county Republican Party. That July, Guadagno left the Republican Party and registered as an unaffiliated voter, reportedly due to her discontent with Golden. Guadagno is now a partner at the law-firm of Connell Foley and the president and executive director of Mercy Center Corporation in Asbury Park, New Jersey. Mercy Center is a four star charity rated non-profit that feeds and services 3000 families in six counties and operates a tuition free, faith based middle school for girls in Asbury Park, New Jersey, mercycenternj.org. The agency’s vision is to end generational poverty one child and one family at a time.

== Controversies, issues and positions ==
=== Abortion ===
Guadagno supports a pro-choice position on abortion but would like to see fewer women choose the option of abortion. She herself adopted a son. Guadagno's views on abortion contrast with Christie's pro-life stance on abortion.

=== Arts Council allegations ===
In early 2011, after reviewing a routine state audit of the prior administration's affairs, Guadagno publicly criticized the New Jersey State Council on the Arts for its sloppy handling of public art projects, implying that state funds may have been fraudulently awarded. An official state investigation ended in December 2011 with no finding of illegality. But, the insider contracts were cancelled, the money was returned and the director who awarded the insider contracts was replaced by the Council of the Arts.

=== Allegations of pension fraud ===
While she was Monmouth County sheriff, in 2008, Guadagno hired Michael Donovan, a retired investigator with the county prosecutor's office, as her chief of law enforcement. Under state laws on "double dipping", anyone holding such a position must forego any public pension they are otherwise eligible to rec. Donovan became the chief warrant officer, in charge of serving legal process and arrest warrants, exempt from the pension system.Guadagno argued this saved taxpayers' money

Guadagno established that the state Police and Firemen's Retirement System (PFRS) had approved her actions. However, in 2011 the PFRS board, responding to allegations of pension fraud within sheriff's offices around the state, requested that the office of Attorney General Paula T. Dow review records of Donovan's hiring for possible "false and conflicting statements" by Guadagno, by then lieutenant governor. Instead of requesting a special prosecutor, Governor Christie referred the case to attorney general's Division of Criminal Justice (DCJ), which a year later concluded the investigation. An investigative reporter sued the state to release the records of the investigation; in early 2016 a court ordered DCJ to release some of those records but excluded a five-page document on Guadagno's role.

=== Hoboken Sandy funds ===
On January 18, 2014, Mayor of Hoboken Dawn Zimmer, appearing on MSNBC, claimed that Guadagno had pulled her aside in a supermarket parking lot and directly linked Hoboken's receipt of Sandy funding to the approval of a large proposed private development project that required substantial zoning changes to move forward. Mayor Zimmer then said that several days later Richard Constable, director of the New Jersey Department of Community Affairs also insinuated to her that more Sandy relief funds would be released to the city if it approved the project in its northwest quadrant. The developer, the Rockefeller Group, has ties with Port Authority of New York and New Jersey Chief David Samson, a Christie appointee and close Christie associate. On February 22 the Federal Bureau of Investigation interviewed members of the city's government and potential witnesses, who were instructed to preserve any evidence they might possess. They were also asked by the office of United States Attorney for the District of New Jersey, Paul Fishman, to not discuss the matter publicly. On January 31, the city acknowledged that it had received subpoenas from that office.

After a 16-month investigation the US attorney for NJ concluded that Zimmer's claims were unfounded. In letters dated May 1, 2015, to Guadagno, Constable and Ferzan the US Attorney wrote: "Based on the evidence developed during the investigation and our review of applicable law, we have concluded that no further action is warranted in this matter. Accordingly, the investigation of these allegations have been closed."

=== 2010 vacation ===
In December 2010, Guadagno went on a scheduled vacation with her father who was dying of prostate cancer, while Governor Christie later decided to go with his family to Disney World. With both officials out of state, a blizzard hit New Jersey and Stephen M. Sweeney, the senate president and a Democrat, had to preside as acting governor to declare a state of emergency. Guadagno and Christie were criticized for both being out of state at the same time.

== Personal life ==
Guadagno moved to New Jersey in 1991 and has been a resident of Monmouth Beach, a borough in Monmouth County, since marrying Michael Guadagno in 1991. Her husband was a judge of the New Jersey Superior Court, Appellate Division. He was appointed to the bench in 2005 by then-Governor Richard Codey, and elevated to the Appellate Division by Chief Justice Stuart Rabner in 2012. The Guadagnos have three sons.

Judge Guadagno submitted his letter of resignation on January 26, 2017, in advance of reaching the mandatory judicial retirement age of 70 later that year. Because Guadagno was ex officio Secretary of State of New Jersey at that time (the post being tied to that of Lieutenant Governor) and thereby received resignation and retirement letters of New Jersey judges, Judge Guadagno's resignation letter was addressed to his wife in her personal as well as official capacity, referred her then-prospective run for the post of governor, and was signed "your loving husband".

The Guadagnos have three sons. One of the three, Kevin, is a graduate of the United States Air Force Academy and is an F-35 fighter pilot. Another son, Michael, rowed crew at Dartmouth College.

== Electoral history ==
New Jersey gubernatorial election, 2017
Party	Candidate	Votes	%	±%
Democratic	Phil Murphy	1,203,110	56.03%	▲17.84
Republican	Kim Guadagno	899,583	41.89%	▼18.41
Independent	Gina Genovese	12,294	0.57%	N/A
Libertarian	Peter J. Rohrman	10,531	0.49%	▼0.08
Green	Seth Kaper-Dale	10,053	0.47%	▲0.08
Constitution	Matthew Riccardi	6,864	0.32%	N/A
Independent	Vincent Ross	4,980	0.29%	N/A
Total votes		2,147,415	100.00%	N/A
Democratic gain from Republican				

Republican primary results
Party	Candidate	Votes	%
Republican	Kim Guadagno	113,846	46.70%
Republican	Jack Ciattarelli	75,556	30.99%
Republican	Hirsh Singh	23,728	9.73%
Republican	Joseph R. Rullo	15,816	6.49%
Republican	Steven Rogers	14,187	5.82%
Write-in		638	0.27%
Total votes		243,771	100.00%

== See also ==
- List of female lieutenant governors in the United States

Political offices
Preceded by Joseph Oxley	Sheriff of Monmouth County; 2008–2010	Succeeded by Shaun Golden
New office	Lieutenant Governor of New Jersey; 2010–2018	Succeeded by Sheila Oliver
Preceded by Nina Wells	Secretary of State of New Jersey; 2010–2018	Succeeded by Tahesha Way
Party political offices
First	Republican nominee for Lieutenant Governor of New Jersey; 2009, 2013	Succeeded by Carlos Rendo
Preceded by Chris Christie	Republican nominee for Governor of New Jersey; 2017	Succeeded by Jack Ciattarelli
