= Charles Asa Francis =

American politician

New Jersey Assembly
- In office ?–?

New Jersey Senate
- In office 1897–1902

Mayor of Long Branch
- In office 1903–1906

Sheriff of Monmouth County
- In office 1903–1906

Treasurer of Monmouth County
- In office 1920–1934

Personal details
- Born: October 28, 1855 Adelphia, New Jersey
- Died: April 18, 1934 (aged 78) Long Branch, New Jersey

Charles Asa Francis (1855–1934) was an American politician from Monmouth County, New Jersey.

== Background ==
Francis was born on October 28, 1855, in Adelphia, New Jersey. He died on April 18, 1934, in Long Branch, New Jersey, and was buried in Old First Methodist Church Cemetery in West Long Branch.

== Career ==
After serving for two terms in the New Jersey General Assembly, Francis served in the New Jersey Senate from 1897 to 1902, his final year as president.

Having previously served as council-member, Francis became the first Mayor of Long Branch, New Jersey, under the reincorporation of Long Branch as a city on April 8, 1903.

He served as Sheriff of Monmouth County from 1903 to 1906.

He served as treasurer of the county in the 14 years preceding his death.
