= John T. Haight =

American politician

Monmouth County clerk
- In office 1890
- Preceded by: C. Ewing Patterson
- Succeeded by: Theodore Aumack

Director of the Monmouth County, New Jersey Board of Chosen Freeholders
- In office May 1875 – May 1881
- Preceded by: Austin H. Patterson
- Succeeded by: Charles H. Boud

Member of the New Jersey General Assembly from Monmouth County
- In office 1871–1872

Member of the Monmouth County Board of Chosen Freeholders from Atlantic Highlands
- In office 1868 – May 1875

Personal details
- Born: John Tyler Haight; October 15, 1842 Colts Neck Township, New Jersey, US
- Died: December 3, 1892 (aged 50)
- Party: Democrat
- Relations: Charles Haight (brother)
- Children: Thomas Griffith Haight
- Education: Princeton University

John Tyler Haight (October 15, 1841 – December 3, 1892) was an American Democratic Party politician from New Jersey, who served on the Colts Neck Township Committee, the Monmouth County, New Jersey Board of Chosen Freeholders and as Monmouth County Clerk.

He was born in Colts Neck and was a resident there his entire life, with the exception of that time spent as a student at Princeton University.

Haight was elected in 1868 to the Board of Chosen Freeholders representing Atlantic Highlands. At the May, 1875 annual reorganization, he was chosen as Director of the Monmouth County, New Jersey Board of Chosen Freeholders, and served as Director through May 1881, when he left the board.

He served in the New Jersey State Assembly in 1871 and 1872.

In 1890, Haight was the successful Democratic candidate for county clerk, defeating Democratic incumbent C. Ewing Patterson, who was running as an independent, and John Hubbard, the Republican.

John T. Haight died of pneumonia on December 3, 1892. A brother, Charles Haight, served in the United States House of Representatives, and a son, Thomas Griffith Haight, served as a judge on the Third Circuit Court of Appeals.

== See also ==
- List of Monmouth County Freeholder Directors
- John T. Haight on The Political Graveyard

== Notes and references ==
Political offices
Preceded by C. Ewing Patterson	Monmouth County Clerk; 1890-1892	Succeeded by Theodore Aumack
Preceded by Austin H. Patterson	Monmouth County Freeholder Director; 1875-1881	Succeeded by Charles H. Boud
