= Joseph W. Oxley =

American politician and sheriff

Judge of the Superior Court of New Jersey, Vicinage 9
- Incumbent
- Assumed office 2013
- Appointed by: Chris Christie

Sheriff of Monmouth County, New Jersey
- In office 1996–2007
- Preceded by: William M. Lanzaro
- Succeeded by: Kim Guadagno

Mayor of Middletown Township, New Jersey
- In office 1994–1996

Personal details
- Born: June 1958 (age 68) Monmouth County, New Jersey, U.S.
- Party: Republican
- Education: University of Maryland (B.A.); Delaware Law School (J.D.)

Joseph W. Oxley (born June 1958) is an American Republican Party politician who served as Sheriff of Monmouth County, New Jersey from 1996 to 2007, and chaired the Monmouth County Republican Committee from June 2008 to June 2012. Oxley was nominated to the New Jersey Superior Court by Governor Chris Christie on May 14, 2012. Oxley's nomination was confirmed by the senate on February 7, 2013.

== Biography ==
Oxley grew up in Middletown Township, New Jersey. He earned a Bachelor of Arts degree from the University of Maryland in 1980 and was awarded his Juris Doctor in 1983 from the Delaware Law School.

Prior to serving as sheriff, he served on the Middletown Township Committee, and as deputy mayor and Mayor of Middletown Township, New Jersey. He also served as an assistant prosecutor in the Monmouth County Prosecutor's Office.

After defeating incumbent William M. Lanzaro in the 1995 Republican primary, Oxley was elected sheriff of Monmouth County in the general election that year. As sheriff, he was responsible for managing a staff of nearly 700 that includes operation of a 1,328-bed maximum security prison, a youth detention center and a police communications and 9-1-1 emergency dispatch system. In 2006, he received the Ferris E. Lucas Sheriff of the Year Award.

In 2007, Oxley, a full-time sheriff, announced that he would not seek reelection and would return to the private practice of law. He joined the Scarinci Hollenbeck Law Firm as a partner. He serves as an adjunct professor at Monmouth University.

On June 10, 2008, Oxley was elected to a two-year term as Chairman of the Monmouth County Republican Committee by unanimous vote of its membership. Oxley served two terms and did not run for reelection as Chairman in June 2012. Oxley's successor was John O. Bennett.

On February 7, 2013 Oxley's nomination to the NJ Superior Court was confirmed by the NJ State Senate. Pursuant to the General Assignment Order of July 1, 2013, Judge Oxley is assigned to the Law Division, Criminal Part, of the Vicinage of Monmouth, sitting in Freehold, NJ.

Political offices
Preceded by William M. Lanzaro	Monmouth County Sheriff; 1996–2007	Succeeded by Kim Guadagno
