= Monmouth Ocean Middlesex Line =

Proposed New Jersey Transit rail line

MOM located in eastern part of Central NJ, shown in dark blue

The Monmouth Ocean Middlesex Line (MOM) is a passenger rail project in the US state of New Jersey, proposed by NJ Transit Rail Operations (NJT) to serve the Central New Jersey counties of Monmouth, Ocean, and Middlesex. The line would originate/terminate around Lakehurst at its southern end. It would junction with either the Northeast Corridor Line or North Jersey Coast Line to provide service north to Newark Penn Station, with potential connecting or continuing service to Hoboken Terminal or New York Penn Station.

The area is fast-growing, densely-populated and home to the fifth and eighth most populated municipalities in the state, Lakewood and Toms River, neither of which is served by passenger rail. Bus service is provided on NJ Transit bus routes 130-139 and from Lakewood Bus Terminal on the U.S. Route 9 corridor, which suffers from traffic congestion and safety issues.

NJT completed a draft Major Investment Study distributed in 1996 identifying the need for new rail service for the counties and enhancement of U.S. Route 9 bus service. The Federal Transit Administration (FTA) authorized the creation of a draft environmental impact statement in 2002, conducted by SYSTRA, which identified three build alternatives in scoping documents. A draft alternatives analysis report was released in 2010. The baseline (no-build) alternative to expand the Route 9 BBS (bus bypass shoulder lanes) also remains under study. The line is included in the Regional Plan Association's Fourth Regional Plan.

The advancement of project beyond studies (commissioned by NJT or the North Jersey Transportation Planning Authority) has lagged due to lack of funding and political wherewithal.

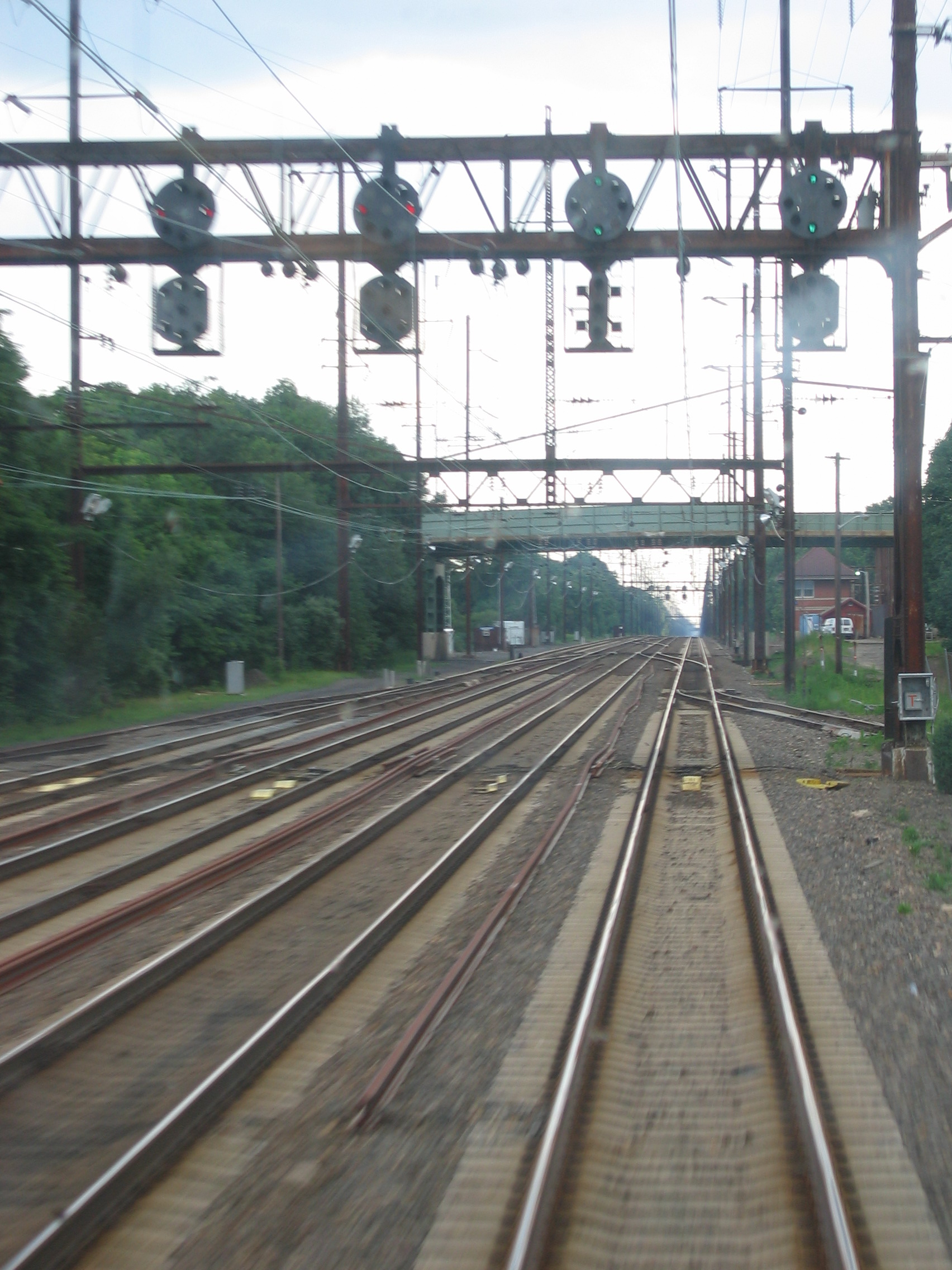
Midway Interlocking at Monmouth Junction

== Alternative alignments ==
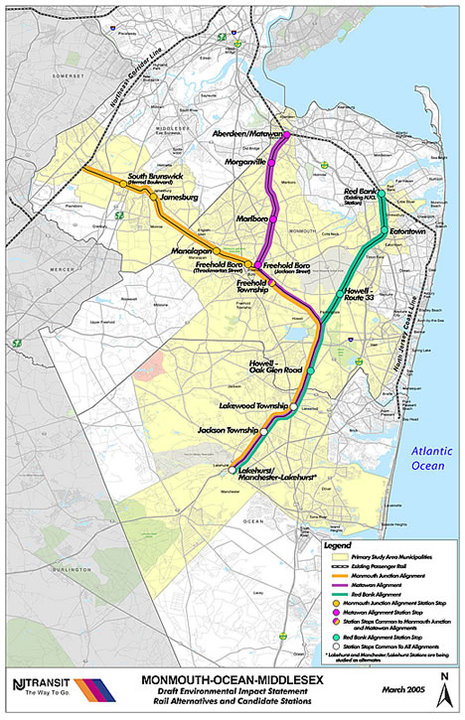
Proposed NJT service corridors

The line would travel north to provide diesel commuter rail service from Lakehurst/Manchester to Farmingdale passing through Toms River (Dover), Jackson, Lakewood, in Ocean and Howell in Monmouth. Stations would be located at Manchester-Lakehurst, Jackson, and Howell-Oak Glen Road. All alternatives include a rail yard at Lakehurst Maxfield Field.

From a junction in Farmingdale, three possible alignments are under consideration in Monmouth and Middlesex counties. One alternative would use an existing rail corridor that runs from to Lakehurst along the Jamesburg Branch, the Freehold Secondary, and the Southern Secondary (Southern Branch) and would join the Northeast Corridor Line at Monmouth Junction. Another would use an existing rail corridor from Lakehurst along the Southern Secondary and join the North Jersey Coast Line at Red Bank station. Another would use the abandoned Freehold Branch, Freehold Secondary, and the Southern Secondary from Matawan and join the North Jersey Coast at Aberdeen-Matawan station.

Service would continue north to Newark Penn Station (with connecting or continuing service to Hoboken Terminal or New York Penn Station). The following candidate stations were identified in 2005:

Matawan alignment	Red Bank alignment	Monmouth Jct alignment
Lakehurst/Manchester; Jackson; Lakewood; Howell-Oak Glen Road; Freehold Township; Freehold Borough; Marlboro; Morganville; North Jersey Coast Line at Aberdeen-Matawan station	Lakehurst/Manchester; Jackson; Lakewood; Howell-Oak Glen Road; Howell-Route 33; Eatontown; North Jersey Coast Line at Red Bank station	Lakehurst/Manchester; Jackson; Lakewood; Howell-Oak Glen Road; Freehold Township; Freehold Borough; Manalapan; Jamesburg; South Brunswick-Herrod Blvd; Northeast Corridor Line at Monmouth Junction

New Jersey Southern RR map showing the right of ways under consideration for MOM

== Historical ROWs ==
The project would make use of the rights-of-way (ROW) of former branches of the Pennsylvania Railroad (PRR) and the Central Railroad of New Jersey (CNJ), some originally developed by New Jersey Southern Railroad, including CNJ's Blue Comet route to Atlantic City. The ROWs of the Southern Secondary (CNJ), largely owned by New Jersey Transit (NJT), and the Freehold Secondary (PRR) are partially in use for freight service by Conrail's (CRCX) North Jersey Shared Assets Operations (CSAO).

The property for the inland sections of the Henry Hudson Trail is currently railbanked by NJT, which leases the line for a rail trail to the Monmouth County Park System. The former CNJ ROW is leased through 2020 unlike most rail trails, was never officially abandoned. NJT reserves the right to reinstitute rail service. According to the Sierra Club, should NJT opt to restore service it would be the first instance in U.S. history where a rail trail reverted to railway usage.

Monmouth Battlefield State Park is traversed by the ROW used by the PRR's Farmingdale and Squan Village Railroad/Freehold and Jamesburg Agricultural Railroad.

=== Current Status ===
As of 2025, the Monmouth Ocean Middlesex (MOM) Line remains a proposed project and is not under construction. Originally introduced in the 1990s, the project has undergone multiple feasibility studies but continues to face delays due to funding constraints, environmental reviews, and alignment disputes among the counties involved.

A 2009 agreement between officials in Monmouth, Ocean, and Middlesex counties identified the Lakehurst-to-Red Bank route, using existing freight rights-of-way, as the preferred alignment. However, progress stalled in subsequent years.

In a 2020 report by the North Jersey Transportation Planning Authority (NJTPA), the MOM Line was included in its Long Range Transportation Plan as a “project of interest” but lacked committed funding or an implementation timeline.

NJ Transit continues to maintain the MOM Line as a concept in its strategic planning portfolio, but no environmental impact statement or federal approval has been finalized. In early 2023, local advocates renewed calls for federal infrastructure funding to support the project amid increased ridership demand and traffic congestion along U.S. Route 9.

Although there is continuing public support—particularly from Ocean County, where residents face long bus commutes—NJ Transit has prioritized other projects in its capital program, such as the Gateway Tunnel and electrification efforts on existing lines.

As of mid-2025, the MOM Line remains in the pre-development phase, with no confirmed timeline for advancement or construction.

== See also ==
- Route 9 bus rapid transit
- Toms River Railroad
- List of New Jersey railroad junctions
