= John J. Ely =

American politician (1778–1852)

Sheriff of Monmouth County
- In office 1817–1820
- Preceded by: Charles Parker
- Succeeded by: James Lloyd

Sheriff of Monmouth County
- In office 1825–1828
- Preceded by: Richard Lloyd
- Succeeded by: Daniel Holmes

Personal details
- Born: April 7, 1778 New Jersey
- Died: January 11, 1852 (aged 73) Holmdel Township, New Jersey
- Party: Democratic-Republican; National Republican
- Spouse: Achsah Mount

John J. Ely (April 7, 1778 – January 11, 1852) was an American politician who served as the Director of the Monmouth County, New Jersey Board of Chosen Freeholders, and as Sheriff of Monmouth County, and as a member of the New Jersey General Assembly.

== Biography ==
Elected sheriff in 1817, during the Era of Good Feelings, as a Democratic Republican, Ely served three, one-year terms, the constitutional term limit at the time.

In the March 1822 township elections, he was elected to represent Freehold Township on the Board of Chosen Freeholders. At the May 8, 1822 annual reorganization, he was chosen as Director of the Monmouth County, New Jersey Board of Chosen Freeholders, and served as Director until May 13, 1835, when he left the board.

In October 1822, Ely was elected to a one-year term representing Monmouth County in the New Jersey General Assembly.

As the Era of Good Feelings closed, Ely affiliated with the National Republican Party, and returned to the shrievalty in 1825. He served three years. In 1832 and 1833, he was the National Republican Candidate for the Monmouth County seat in the New Jersey Legislative Council, losing both times to Daniel Holmes.

In 1829, John J. Ely moved to Holmdel Township, where he died on January 11, 1852. He is buried in the Holmdel Baptist Churchyard.

A son, Horatio Ely, would go on to serve as sheriff from 1837 to 1838.

== See also ==
- List of Monmouth County Freeholder Directors

Political offices
Preceded by Charles Parker	Monmouth County Sheriff; 1817-1820	Succeeded by James Lloyd
Preceded by Richard Lloyd	Monmouth County Sheriff; 1825-1828	Succeeded by Daniel Holmes
Preceded by William I. Conover	Monmouth County Freeholder Director; 1822-1835	Succeeded by John I. Conover
