= Arthur Pryor =

American bandleader, composer, virtuoso trombonist in the Sousa Band (1869–1942)

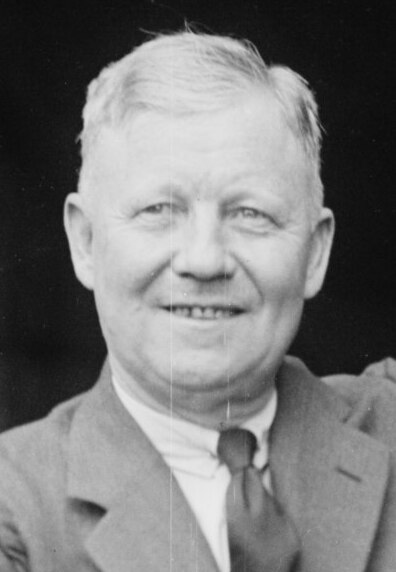
- Arthur Pryor

Monmouth County Board of Chosen Freeholders
- In office 1934–1937
- Preceded by: Bryant B. Newcomb
- Succeeded by: J. Russell Woolley

Personal details
- Born: Arthur Willard Pryor; September 22, 1869 Saint Joseph, Missouri, U.S.
- Died: June 18, 1942 (aged 72) West Long Branch, New Jersey, U.S.
- Resting place: Glenwood Cemetery
- Party: Democratic Party
- Spouse: Maude Russell
- Children: 3, including Roger Pryor
- Occupation: Musician; bandleader; composer; conductor; arranger; politician
- Musical career
- Origin: Denver, Colorado, U.S.
- Genres: Jazz; swing; big band
- Instrument: Trombone
- Years active: 1892–1933
- Formerly of: Sousa Band

Arthur Willard Pryor (September 22, 1869 – June 18, 1942) was a trombone virtuoso, bandleader, and soloist with the Sousa Band. He was a prolific composer of band music, his best-known composition being "The Whistler and His Dog". In later life, he became a Democratic Party politician from New Jersey, who served on the Monmouth County Board of Chosen Freeholders during the 1930s.

== Early life and education ==
He was born on September 22, 1869, on the second floor of the Lyceum Theater in Saint Joseph, Missouri. He was the son of Samuel Pryor, bandmaster and founder of the original Pryor band, and his wife. Arthur first took up music at a very young age under the tutelage of his father and was playing the valve trombone by age 11. The story goes that whenever he hit a sour note while practicing, his father planted a resounding crack on his head with a violin bow. The boy developed until he was so skilled that he won a place in the John Philip Sousa's band. He was hailed as a prodigy after this.

== Musical career ==
That Flying Rag
Arthur Pryor's "That Flying Rag" performed by Arthur Pryor's Band in 1911. Arrangement by Louis-Philippe Laurendeau.

Pryor went on to direct the Stanley Opera Company in Denver, Colorado, until joining the Sousa Band in 1892. He played his first solo with the Sousa Band at age 22 during the 1893 World's Columbian Exposition in Chicago. During his 12 years with the Sousa Band, Pryor estimated that he played 10,000 solos. From 1895 to 1903, Pryor was assistant conductor of the Sousa Band. During his association with the "March King", Pryor toured throughout the US and Europe. While in Europe, he entertained King Edward VII of England and Emperor of Russia Nicholas II with his trombone solos. Once while in Germany, all the trombonists of the German Army bands were ordered to hear him play. They were so amazed at his playing that they insisted on taking his trombone apart, refusing to believe that it was natural. Finally one German said: "No one can play so well. It is a Yankee trick."

Blue Bells of Scotland, for Trombone and Band (As performed by Arthur Pryor and Sousa's band)

In 1902 after the death of his father, Pryor ended his association with Sousa and took over the reorganized Pryor band; he led its debut at the Majestic Theatre in New York City on November 15, 1903. For 30 years thereafter, Pryor's band was an American institution. He made his first appearance in Asbury Park, New Jersey, at the Shore in 1904, where he continued to play until 1930. The Pryor Band toured until 1909, when he decided to settle down and make Asbury Park the home of the band. Also at this time, he became a staff conductor and arranger for the Victor Talking Machine Company in Camden, New Jersey. He organized a second band that played at the entertainment complex of Coney Island, New York, for a number of years.

== Political office ==
A Japanese two step, composed around 1905 by Arthur Pryor

Pryor retired from full-time conducting in 1933. On November 7 of that year, he and Henry W. Herbert were elected to the Monmouth County Board of Chosen Freeholders, defeating Director Bryant B. Newcomb and his running mate, Arthur Johnson. Pryor and Herbert would each serve one, three-year term in office. In the 1936 election, they were defeated by Republicans J. Russell Woolley and Edgar O. Murphy.

== Personal life and death ==
Pryor was married to Maude Russell Pryor. Their son Roger Pryor (1901–1974) also became a bandleader and a film actor. They also had sons Arthur Jr. (1897–1954), who became a bandsman and advertising executive, and Samuel Pryor.

The senior Pryor suffered a stroke on June 17, 1942, and died on June 18 at his home in West Long Branch, New Jersey. Funeral services were conducted June 21, 1942, at the Trinity Episcopal Church, Asbury Park, followed by burial in Glenwood Cemetery, West Long Branch.

== Legacy ==
Pryor composed some 300 works, including marches, novelties, tone poems and three light operas, Jinga Boo, Uncle Tom's Cabin and On the Eve of Her Wedding Day. Among his best-known numbers were "On Jersey Shore", "Queen Titania" and "The Whistler and His Dog". He set to work on an opera titled Peter and Paul, with a libretto by L. Frank Baum; the libretto has been lost. It was intended to star Fred Stone and David Montgomery in several roles in several time periods.

During his career, Pryor wrote some of today's most well-known trombone literature, including an arrangement of the heralded "Bluebells of Scotland", as well as band novelty works such as "The Whistler and His Dog", with its piccolo solo, his best-known composition. Much of this literature has been recorded by Ian Bousfield on his CD Pryor Engagement (Doyen DOY CD212).

In 1985, thousands of early Pryor scores were discovered by conductor Rick Benjamin. He has played many of Pryor's compositions with his Paragon Ragtime Orchestra.
