= Joseph C. Irwin =

American politician

Freehold Director of Monmouth County
- In office 1951–1974
- Preceded by: James S. Parkes
- Succeeded by: Philip N. Gumbs

Member of the Monmouth County Board of Chosen Freeholders
- In office 1938–1974

Member of the New Jersey General Assembly from Monmouth County
- In office 1936–1938

Personal details
- Born: February 13, 1904 Red Bank, New Jersey, US
- Died: October 31, 1987 (aged 83) Red Bank, New Jersey, US
- Resting place: Holmdel Cemetery and Mausoleum, Holmdel, New Jersey, US
- Party: Republican
- Nickname: Mr. Monmouth County

Joseph C. Irwin (February 13, 1904 – October 31, 1987) was an American Republican Party politician from New Jersey, who served on the Red Bank, New Jersey Borough Council, as a member of the New Jersey General Assembly, and as a member of the Monmouth County, New Jersey Board of Chosen Freeholders. After several decades of public service, residents knew him as "Mr. Monmouth County".

== Biography ==
He was born on February 13, 1904, in Red Bank, New Jersey, to Charles P. Irwin. He was elected to the Red Bank Borough Council in 1934. In 1936, he was elected to the State Assembly, where he served two, one-year terms.

In 1938, Irwin was elected to the Board of Chosen Freeholders; he would serve twelve, three-year terms. Irwin was chosen as Director of the Board for the years 1951 through 1974.

In the Democratic landslide of the 1974 general election, Joseph C. Irwin was defeated for a thirteenth term. He died on October 31, 1987, in Red Bank, New Jersey.

== See also ==
- List of Monmouth County Freeholder Directors

Political offices
Preceded by James S. Parkes	Monmouth County Freeholder Director; 1951-1974	Succeeded by Philip N. Gumbs
