= Lillian G. Burry =

American politician (1936–2025)

Freehold Director of Monmouth County
- In office 2008–2020

Member of the Monmouth County Board of Chosen Freeholders
- In office 2006–2024
- Succeeded by: Erik Anderson

Personal details
- Born: Lillian G. Beneforti; January 15, 1936 New York City, New York, US
- Died: August 28, 2025 (aged 89)
- Party: Republican
- Education: Wagner College

Lillian G. Burry (January 15, 1936 – August 28, 2025) was an American Republican Party politician who served on the Monmouth County, New Jersey Board of County Commissioners from 2006 to 2024. She first served as Director of the Board in 2008, the first woman and the first Italian-American to do so in Monmouth County. She was again chosen as Director of the Board in 2011, 2014, and 2017.

Burry chose not to run for re-election in 2023 and was succeeded as commissioner by Erik Anderson, the former mayor of Shrewsbury, New Jersey.

== Biography ==
Lillian Beneforti was born January 15, 1936 in New York City, where she attended the local public schools and, later, Wagner College, where she graduated cum Laude with a double major (Political Science/History). At Wagner she met her future husband, Captain Donald Burry. She worked in the field of real estate as a licensed broker for more than 40 years, starting out when it was unusual for women to work in that field. She died peacefully August 28, 2025.

== Political career ==
Burry was elected to positions at the local level in both Colts Neck Township and Matawan. In Matawan, she was the first woman elected to the Borough Council. During her tenure she assisted in restoring Borough Hall. The borough received 80 percent of the funding for the project from the U.S. Department of Housing and Urban Development. She participated in the purchase of Matawan's wetlands with 80 percent funding from the state Green Acres Program, and played a leading role in fighting the Imperial Oil Company after the firm was discovered dumping at Burnt Fly Bog. She headed Matawan's Historic Preservation Program, during which time the group purchased and restored the borough's most historic 18th century-era mansion.

In Colts Neck, she was elected to three terms on the Township Committee, where she served as mayor, deputy mayor and committeewoman. Prior to being elected to the Board of County Commissioners, Burry had served as a citizen member of the Monmouth County Planning Board and the Monmouth County Library Commission.

Burry was elected to her first three-year term on the Board in the November 2005 general election and was re-elected in 2008, 2010, 2014, 2017, and 2020. There were reports in local news media that she was preparing to run for re-election in 2023, but she instead chose to retire.

== See also ==
- List of Monmouth County Board of County Commissioner Directors

Political offices
Preceded by William C. Barham	Monmouth County Commission Director; 2008	Succeeded by Barbara J. McMorrow
Preceded by Barbara J. McMorrow	Monmouth County Commission Director; 2010	Succeeded by Incumbent
