= Austin H. Patterson =

American politician (??–1905)

Austin H. Patterson (died June 5, 1905) was an American Democratic Party politician from New Jersey, who served on the Howell Township Committee, the Monmouth County, New Jersey Board of Chosen Freeholders and the New Jersey State Assembly.

== Biography ==
Patterson was born in Monmouth County and was a builder in Blue Ball, now Adelphia, Howell Township. Among his projects was the Monmouth County Court House.

Elected as a Democrat to the State Assembly in 1857, Patterson served through 1860; that year he was elected Speaker of the Assembly.

Patterson fought in the American Civil War and was captain of Company A of the 14th New Jersey Regiment. He would subsequently serve as a staff officer of the First Army Corps, Army of the Potomac; after two years in the Army of the Potomac Patterson was promoted to major of the Thirty Fifth New Jersey Volunteers. He retired from military service with the rank of colonel.

At the close of the war, Col. Patterson reentered politics, serving again in the Assembly from 1870 through 1872. He was Clerk of the Assembly for the years 1875 and 1878.

Patterson was elected to the Board of Chosen Freeholders representing Howell Township. At the May, 1873 annual reorganization, he was chosen as Director of the Monmouth County, New Jersey Board of Chosen Freeholders and served as director through May 1875.

Austin H. Patterson died of cancer on June 5, 1905.

== See also ==
- List of Monmouth County Freeholder Directors

== Notes and references ==
Political offices
Preceded by Edwin Salter	Speaker of the New Jersey General Assembly; 1860	Succeeded by Frederick Halstead Teese
Preceded by William H. Bennett	Monmouth County Freeholder Director; 1873-1875	Succeeded by John T. Haight
