= List of directors of the Monmouth County Board of County Commissioners =

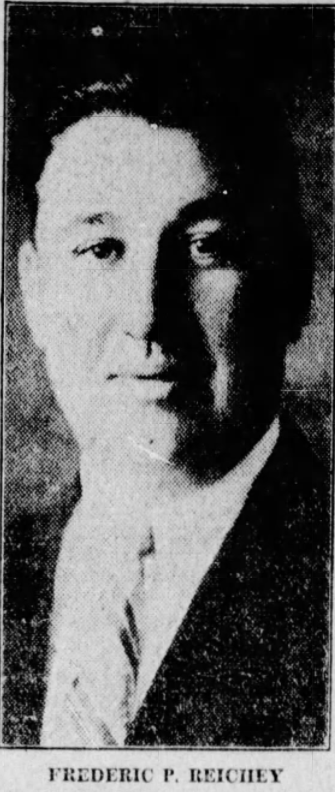

Monmouth County, New Jersey, is governed by a Board of County Commissioners, who choose a director from among themselves. Prior to January 1, 2021, this position was known as the Board of Chosen Freeholders.

Pursuant to legislation passed in 1709, freeholders sat with the justices of the peace as the Board of Justices and Freeholders; the presiding officer was then known as chairman. Chairmen of the Board of Justices and Freeholders are included here where records are still extant, as well as whether they were a justice or a freeholder. Legislation passed in 1798 separated the freeholders and justices; at that time the Board of Chosen Freeholders was established. Before 1906, Monmouth County Freeholders were elected by townships; As a result of a 1905 referendum reducing the membership on the board, from 1906 to the present they have been elected at-large.

On August 21, 2020, "amid a national reckoning to reexamine vestiges of structural racism," Governor Phil Murphy signed a bill to change the name of county governing bodies. Lt. Governor Sheila Oliver, an African-American woman who was once a Freeholder herself, said that the term "refers to a time when only white male landowners could hold public office." The law went into effect on January 1, 2021.

== List of chairmen ==
=== Board of Justices and Freeholders (1790–1798) ===
#	Name	Term	Party	Notes
	Hendrick Hendrickson	1790–1791		Justice. This was his first term. Of Dutch descent, Hendrickson was serving as a Justice of the Peace at least as early as 1784, and from records still extant, was sitting with the Board of Justices and Freeholders by 1788. He served at least to 1796. At the May 12, 1790, annual reorganization, he was chosen as chairman of the board for one year; he was again chosen as chairman at the May 9, 1792, reorganization. In 1797, Hendrickson was elected as a Chosen Freeholder to represent Middletown Township, New Jersey, and served a one-year term. At the May 10, 1797, annual reorganization, he was once again chosen as chairman, and served as in that capacity for one year before leaving the board. In March 1799, Hendrick Hendrickson was elected to the Middletown Township Committee, where he served until 1805.
	Edmund Williams	1791–1792		Shrewsbury. Williams was elected to the board in 1789 to represent and served through 1792. At the May 11, 1791, annual reorganization, he was chosen as chairman, and served as chairman for one year before leaving the board.
	Hendrick Hendrickson	1792–1794		Justice. This was his second term.
	Joseph Holmes	1794–1795		Upper Freehold. This was his first term. Holmes was first elected to the County Board of Justices and Freeholders, the precursor to the Board of Chosen Freeholders, in 1768, and served until May 1776. He again served from May 1782 to May 1783, from 1786 to 1787, and from 1794 to 1803. He was chairman of the board from May 1794 to May 1795, and from May 1796 to May 1797. He later served on the Upper Freehold Township Committee. Holmes died on August 31, 1809, and is buried in the Olde Yellow Meeting House Yard, Upper Freehold Township.
	Elisha Lawrence	1795–1796	Federalist	Justice
	Joseph Holmes	1796–1797		Upper Freehold. This was his second term.
	Hendrick Hendrickson	1797–1798		Middletown

== List of directors ==
=== Board of Chosen Freeholders (1798–2021) ===
#	Name	Term	Party	Notes
1	Captain Theophilus Little	1798–1804		Shrewsbury. (February 15, 1744 – February 19, 1825) He served in the Revolutionary War. He later served as a captain in the New Jersey Militia. Little previously served on the old Board of Justices and Freeholders as a Justice of the Peace. He was elected as a Chosen Freeholder in 1795 to represent Shrewsbury Township, and continued after 1798 on the reconstituted Board of Chosen Freeholders, serving through 1804. At the May 9, 1798, annual reorganization, he was chosen as the first Director of the Monmouth County, New Jersey Board of Chosen Freeholders, and served in that capacity for six years before leaving the board. Little ran as a candidate in the 1799 election for the New Jersey Assembly.
2	James Allen (freeholder)	1804–1805		Howell
3	William Lloyd	1805–1808	Federalist	Freehold
4	Robert Evelman	1808–1810		Shrewsbury
5	John P. Conover	1810–1811		Freehold
6	Garret P. Wikoff	1811–1819	Federalist	Upper Freehold. Of Dutch descent, Wikoff was a resident of Upper Freehold Township, New Jersey. In the 1790s he was an Overseer of the Highways for the northern division of Upper Freehold. From 1801 through 1819 he served on both the Upper Freehold Township Committee and the Monmouth County Board of Chosen Freeholders. At the May 8, 1811, annual reorganization, he was chosen as Director of the Monmouth County, New Jersey Board of Chosen Freeholders, serving until he left the board in 1819. In 1813, Garret P. Wikoff was an unsuccessful Federalist candidate for the New Jersey General Assembly.
7	William I. Conover	1819–1822	Democratic-Republican	Freehold
8	John J. Ely	1822–1835	National Republican	Freehold. (April 7, 1778 – January 11, 1852) was elected sheriff in 1817, during the Era of Good Feelings, as a Democratic Republican, Ely served three, one-year terms, the constitutional term limit at the time. In the March 1822 township elections, he was elected to represent Freehold Township on the Board of Chosen Freeholders. At the May 8, 1822, annual reorganization, he was chosen as Director of the Monmouth County, New Jersey Board of Chosen Freeholders, and served as director until May 13, 1835, when he left the board. In October 1822, Ely was elected to a one-year term representing Monmouth County in the New Jersey General Assembly. As the Era of Good Feelings closed, Ely affiliated with the National Republican Party, and returned to the shrievalty in 1825. He served three years. In 1832 and 1833, he was the National Republican candidate for the Monmouth County seat in the New Jersey Legislative Council, losing both times to Daniel Holmes. In 1829, John J. Ely moved to Holmdel Township, where he died on January 11, 1852. He is buried in the Holmdel Baptist Churchyard. A son, Horatio Ely, would go on to serve as sheriff from 1837 to 1838.
9	John I. Conover	1835–1844	Democratic	Freehold
10	Elisha Lippincott	1844–1848	Whig	Shrewsbury
11	Benjamin I. Lafetra	1848–1851	Democratic	Howell
12	James Patterson	1851–1855	Democratic	Middletown
13	Henry Howland	1855–1857	Democratic	Ocean
14	Thomas H. Lafetra	1857–1860	Democratic	Wall
15	Charles Butcher	1860–1872	Democratic	Howell
16	William H. Bennett	1872–1873	Democratic	Ocean
17	Austin H. Patterson	1873–1875	Democratic	Howell. Patterson was born in Monmouth County and was a builder in Blue Ball, now Adelphia, Howell Township. Among his projects was the Monmouth County Court House. Elected as a Democrat to the State Assembly in 1857, Patterson served through 1860; that year he was elected Speaker of the Assembly. Patterson fought in the American Civil War and was captain of Company A of the 14th New Jersey Regiment. He would subsequently serve as a staff officer of the First Army Corps, Army of the Potomac; after two years in the Army of the Potomac Patterson was promoted to major of the Thirty Fifth New Jersey Volunteers. He retired from military service with the rank of colonel. At the close of the war, Col. Patterson reentered politics, serving again in the Assembly from 1870 through 1872. He was Clerk of the Assembly for the years 1875 and 1878. Patterson was elected to the Board of Chosen Freeholders representing Howell Township. At the May, 1873 annual reorganization, he was chosen as Director of the Monmouth County, New Jersey Board of Chosen Freeholders and served as director through May 1875. Austin H. Patterson died of cancer on June 5, 1905.
18	John T. Haight	1875–1881	Democratic	Atlantic
19	Charles H. Boud	1881–1882	Democratic	Howell
20	John C. Hathaway	1882–1884	Democratic	Neptune
21	Theodore Fields	1884–1887	Democratic	Wall. He served from 1887 to 1890. He was born near Eatonown and educated at Ocean Hill Institute in Long Branch. He went into the hotel business purchasing Osborn House (New Jersey) in Avon-by-the-Sea and Manasquan (then known as Swuan), before locating in Wall Township before returning to farming. He was a founder of the Bonnat Club, a hunting and fishing society.
22	John Henry Heyer	1887–1898	Democratic	Holmdel
23	John Guire	1898–1906	Democratic	Ocean; Ward No. 2, Long Branch
24	William Borden Conover	1907–1910	Republican	At-large. Conover (October 10, 1865 – December 9, 1947), a Matawan resident, was the first Republican and served from 1907 to 1910, the entire four years as director. In the 1905 general election, the voters of Monmouth County approved changing the Board of Chosen Freeholders from 24 members elected by townships and wards to five members elected at-large. The new board was to be elected in the 1906 election. Republicans swept all five seats, defeating a Democratic ticket consisting of five incumbent freeholders, including Director John Guire. The Republicans held the monopoly on the board for four years before being swept out in the Democratic landslide of 1910.
25	John Minton Corlies	1911–1916	Democratic	At-large. (October 30, 1868 – March 8, 1926) He was born in Middletown Township. – March 8, 1926 He attended school there and in Rumson, where his family moved when he was twelve years old. He assisted his father in managing the Dr. Erich Parmly estate in Rumson, and eventually went into the trucking and livery business. He was a member of the Rumson Fire Company. He served on the Shrewsbury Township Committee and later as Mayor of Rumson after that borough's incorporation. In the Democratic landslide of 1910, Corlies was elected to the Board of Chosen Freeholders. At the January 1911 annual reorganization, he was chosen as Director of the Monmouth County, New Jersey Board of Chosen Freeholders, succeeding Republican William B. Conover. He would serve on the board until 1916, when he was defeated by Republican Borden A. Jeffrey. Charles M. Wyckoff succeeded Corlies as director in 1917. He died of a heart attack on March 8, 1926.
26	Charles M. Wyckoff	1917–1918	Democratic	At-large
27	William M. Bergen	1919–1920	Republican	At-large
28	Bryant B. Newcomb	1921–1933	Republican	At-large.
29	Frederic Patrick Reichey	1934–1935	Democratic	At-large. (March 25, 1895 – March 3, 1978) He was born on March 25, 1895, in Belmar, New Jersey. In 1928 he was appointed to the Monmouth County Board of Taxation by Governor A. Harry Moore. William E. MacDonald, of Bradley Beach took his place when he left office. Reichey was elected in a close race in 1932, and served a single three-year term on the board of freeholders. When Democrats took a majority on the board with the election of Arthur Pryor and Henry W. Herbert in the 1933 general election, Reichey was chosen as Director of the Monmouth County, New Jersey Board of Chosen Freeholders for the years 1934 and 1935. Frederic P. Reichey was not a candidate in the 1935 general election. By 1936 he was the Borough Clerk for Bradley Beach, New Jersey. He moved to Schenectady, New York, in 1972. He died on March 3, 1978, at St. Claires Hospital in Schenectady, New York.
30	Raymond L. Wyckoff	1936–1938	Republican	At-large.
31	Joseph Mayer	1938–1942	Republican	At-large
32	Edgar O. Murphy	1942–1947	Republican	At-large
33	James S. Parkes	1948–1950	Republican	At-large
34	Joseph C. Irwin	1951–1974	Republican	At-large
35	Philip N. Gumbs	1975–1976	Democratic	At-large. Gumbs was a first generation American. He served in U.S. Army Air Corps during World War II. He earned his undergraduate degree from Rutgers University and his law degree from Lincoln University in Missouri. He worked as a probation officer and practiced law. Gumbs entered public service by joining of the Matawan Board of Education. Gumbs was a member the Aberdeen Township council, which he did from 1972 to 1975, and served as Mayor of Aberdeen, New Jersey from 1974 to 1975. He was the first African American to serve the Monmouth County Board of Chosen Freeholders. He was elected in 1973 and served from January 1974 until April 1976. Gumbs was chosen as director of the board for the years 1975 and 1976, the first African-American freeholder director in the state's history. In 1976 Gumbs was appointed judge to Worker's Compensation Court Judge by Governor of New Jersey Brendan Byrne, a position he kept until January 1, 2002. He sat on court in four counties. Gumbs died in 2005
36	Ray Kramer	1976	Democratic	At-large
37	Harry Larrison, Jr.	1977–1978	Republican	At-large.
	Ray Kramer	1979–1980	Democratic	At-large
	Harry Larrison, Jr.	1981–1983	Republican	At-large.
38	Thomas J. Lynch, Jr.	1984–1985	Democratic	At-large.
	Harry Larrison, Jr.	1986–2004	Republican	At-large.
39	Thomas J. Powers	2005	Republican	At-large.
40	William C. Barham	2006–2007	Republican	At-large.
41	Lillian G. Burry	2008	Republican	At-large. Lillian G. Burry was the first female director of the Monmouth County, New Jersey Board of Chosen Freeholders.
42	Barbara J. McMorrow	2009	Democratic	At-large.
	Lillian G. Burry	2010	Republican	At-large.
43	Robert D. Clifton	2011	Republican	At-large.
44	John P. Curley	2012	Republican	At-large.
45	Thomas A. Arnone	2013	Republican	At-large.
	Lillian G. Burry	2014	Republican	At-large.
46	Gary J. Rich, Sr.	2015	Republican	At-large.

=== Board of County Commissioners (2021–present) ===
#	Name	Term	Party	Notes
1	Thomas A. Arnone	2021	Republican	At-large. First Director of the Board of county commissioners for Monmouth County
