= Southern Secondary =

- Map

Overview
- Status: Active (Red Bank to Lakehurst)
- Owner: Conrail Shared Assets Operations
- Locale: New Jersey
- Termini: Red Bank; Winslow Junction

Service
- Type: Freight rail
- System: CSAO
- Operator(s): Delaware and Raritan River Railroad

Technical
- Number of tracks: 1
- Track gauge: 4 ft 8 1/2 in (1,435 mm) standard gauge

The Southern Secondary is a rail line in New Jersey, operated by Conrail Shared Assets Operations (CSAO) from South Amboy to Red Bank, and the Delaware and Raritan River Railroad (DRR), a subsidiary of Chesapeake and Delaware, LLC, between Red Bank and Lakewood. The entire active portion of the line is owned by NJ Transit. The active portion of the line runs from South Amboy to the current end of track at Lakewood. The line is owned by NJ Transit, but the southern portion (Red Bank, NJ to Lakewood), is not shared with passenger trains. Beyond Lakewood, the tracks are owned by CSAO as far as Lakehurst, but are inactive between Lakewood and Lakehurst.

== History ==
=== Raritan & Delaware Bay and NJ Southern ===
The line started as part of the Raritan and Delaware Bay Railroad, and soon passed through the ownership of the New Jersey Southern Railroad to the hands of the Central Railroad of New Jersey, which took ownership of the line in 1879.

=== CNJ Southern Division (1879–1976) ===
A map of the NJS

From 1879, the line was owned by the Central Railroad of New Jersey (CNJ), which used it as their Southern Division, which, at its greatest extent, ran from Red Bank to the shores of the Delaware Bay at Bivalve and Bayside. The line hosted the CNJ's famous passenger train the Blue Comet from 1929 to 1941. The line prospered into the 1940s when, like all American rail lines and the railroads that owned them, it entered a period of decline. In 1957, the last scheduled passenger service ended on the line, leaving it as a freight-only line. Despite the sand traffic that frequented the line, the number of general freights (not including sand and local freights to serve the industries along the line) dwindled to two, JS-1 and SJ-2 as the northeastern rail scene became more grim. In 1976, Conrail took over all operations, and in 1978, it severed the line between Woodmansie and Winslow Junction, ending its use as a through route linking South and North Jersey. Within the next decade, operations would be cut back again to Lakehurst.

=== Conrail Shared Assets Operations (1999–present) ===
From June, 1 1999, the line has been operated by Conrail Shared Assets Operations (CSAO), and despite the recovering railroad state in this time frame, the line's customer base continued to dwindle, and in 2010, the line was cut back further to Lakewood. The line also included the Toms River Industrial Track (Lakehurst to Toms River), but it was placed out of service after all of the customers discontinued rail service.

Effective July 1, 2022, CSAO interchanges with the Delaware and Raritan River Railroad at Red Bank. Despite the change in common carrier service, CSAO retains trackage rights over the entire route.

=== Delaware and Raritan River Railroad (2022-present) ===
The Delaware and Raritan River Railroad assumed common carrier operations between Red Bank and Lakewood as of July 1, 2022. The DRR is responsible for serving all customers on this section of the route.

== Current operations ==
The line between Red Bank and Naval Weapons Station Earle is currently out of service, but is still maintained. The Delaware & Raritan River Railroad serves customers between Earle and Lakewood, with cars coming from Jamesburg via the Freehold Secondary. The last four customers on the line are:

- Laird & Company, Colts Neck (Scobeyville), America's oldest Apple jack distillery receives ethanol/ethyl alcohol loads. (Uses Brick Recycling siding along Rt. 34)
- U.S. Navy Weapons Station Earle, Howell (Earle's only connection to the outside rail network is here). Receives service on average once every 10 years, typically less frequently.
- Extech Building Materials, Howell, receives building materials.
- Woodhaven Lumber, Lakewood, receives lumber.

== See also ==
- Conrail Shared Assets Operations
- New Jersey Southern Railroad
- Central Railroad of New Jersey
- Blue Comet
- Monmouth Ocean Middlesex Line
- New Jersey Transit Rail Operations#Ownership
