= New Jersey Southern Railroad =

Railroad in New Jersey

Map

New Jersey Southern RR and connections

The New Jersey Southern Railroad was a railroad that started in 1854. It would continue under this name until the 1870s as a separate company and the lines that it had constructed or run continued to be run in the New Jersey Southern name until the early 2000s.

== Raritan and Delaware Bay Railroad ==
The New Jersey Southern Railroad (NJS) began life as the Raritan and Delaware Bay Railroad Company (R&DB), in March 1854. The R&DB was chartered to construct a railroad from the Raritan Bay to Cape Island (Cape May), near the outlet of the Delaware Bay. It was to form part of a rail and water route from the New York City area to the Norfolk, Virginia area. The man behind it was William A Torrey, who owned 43 square miles (110 km^{2}) in the area of present-day Lakehurst.

Construction began in 1858 from Port Monmouth on Raritan Bay. The first segment opened in June 1860 ran south via Red Bank as far as Eatontown and then by a branch running east to the resort town of Long Branch on the shore. It was the first railroad to reach Long Branch. Summer service in the first year was three train and boat trips per day in each direction. This first section included what would remain the two largest engineering works on the line: the long pier at Port Monmouth and the Navesink River bridge at Red Bank.

Later in 1860 the main line was opened as far as Lakewood. As construction continued, instead of turning southeast at Lakehurst to Toms River and parallel to the shore to Cape May, the main line continued southwest, opening to Whiting (Manchester Township) and Atsion (now in Wharton State Forest) in 1862. The route passed through the center of the lightly populated Pine Barrens, and was connected to towns on Barnegat Bay only by stages running on public roads. A branch to Toms River was opened later, in 1866, and extended to Waretown in 1872.

The reason for the Pine Barrens routing soon became clear. In September 1862, the R&DB and the Camden and Atlantic Railroad began operating a through service between the New York City market (specifically, in Jersey City) and Philadelphia once a day, without change of trains between Port Monmouth and Camden. (New Jersey trains would only begin entering New York City in 1910 with the opening of Pennsylvania Station.) To make this possible the two railroads had built a connecting line from Atsion to Atco on the Camden and Atlantic Railroad. As roundabout as it was, this service caused controversy because it broke the state-authorized monopoly of the Camden and Amboy Railroad for travel between Jersey City and Philadelphia. But as the Civil War put demands on the railroads to transport troops and materials, the Camden and Amboy Railroad proved notoriously unable to handle the traffic on its one-track main line across New Jersey, and the R&DB rapidly became a valuable alternate route. 17,500 troops were sent via the R&DB over nine months starting September 1862. But the Camden and Amboy Railroad took the matter to court, and tried to use its influence in the state legislature to dissolve the R&DB, while the R&DB appealed to the United States Congress to protect its operation.

Through service to Camden was discontinued in February 1866, and in December 1867 the R&DB lost its case on appeal and was ordered to close the section of line from Atsion to Atco, making it impossible for passengers to travel to Camden even by changing trains. The Camden and Amboy's zealous defense of its rights is all the more remarkable because the monopoly was set to expire on January 1, 1869.

The Camden and Amboy Railroad further weakened the R&DB by supporting a competing service to Long Branch. The Long Branch and Sea Shore Railroad was opened in 1865 from Spermaceti Cove on Sandy Hook down the narrow sand spit to a station in Long Branch near the R&DB station. This route was shorter and faster both by sea and land than the R&DB route, which had been built incidental to the main line to southern New Jersey. The Camden and Amboy Railroad supplied the locomotives and cars for the new road. The LB&SS would later become part of the New Jersey Southern.

The R&DB company, having exhausted its limited resources on the fight with the Camden and Amboy Railroad, went into bankruptcy, and was reorganized under new management as the New Jersey Southern Railroad near the end of 1869. That summer, a cooperative arrangement with the Camden and Amboy Railroad permitted operation of a train service from Philadelphia to Long Branch, via Trenton, Monmouth Junction, and Farmingdale, using the R&DB main line and branch north of Farmingdale.

City	Station name	Service began	Service ended	Station status
Middletown	Port Monmouth Station	1860		
Middletown	Navesink (Hopping)			
Middletown	Middletown Station (Kings Highway)			
Red Bank	Red Bank	1860		
Shrewsbury	Shrewsbury			
Eatontown	Eatontown Junction			
Colts Neck	Shark River			
Farmingdale	Farmingdale	1860		
Howell	Squankum			
Lakewood	Lakewood	1860		
Lakehurst	Manchester			
Manchester	Whiting			
Manchester	Ferrago Station			
Manchester	Pasadena (Wheatland)			
Woodland	Woodmansie			
Woodland	Shamong Station (Chatsworth)			
Tabernacle	Harris Station			
Shamong	Hampton (Hampton Furnace)			
Shamong	Atsion			
Winslow	Winslow Junction			
Winslow	Winslow (Winslow/Hay's Glass Works)			
Buena Vista	Cedar Lake			
Buena	Landisville			
Buena	Wheat Road Station			
Vineland	Vineland			
Pittsgrove	Norma (Bradway)			
Deerfield	Rosenhayn			
Upper Deerfield	Woodruff Station			
Bridgeton	Bridgeton Junction			
Bridgeton	Bridgeton			
Hopewell	Bowentown			
Greenwich	Sheppard's Mill			
Greenwich	Greenwich			
Greenwich	Greenwich Pier			
Greenwich	Bacon's Neck			
Greenwich	Bayside (Caviar, Bay Side)			

== New Jersey Southern Railroad ==
The new company was created by railroad financier Jay Gould. He had first taken over the Long Branch and Sea Shore Railroad, when it was of no further interest to the Camden and Amboy, and improved it by extending it farther north on Sandy Hook to Horse Shoe Cove. From this base he then acquired the former R&DB. The Horse Shoe Cove dock was more sheltered than Port Monmouth, and its better access to Long Branch made it the preferred route for the combined railroads. Boat service to Port Monmouth was discontinued about 1871. Trains now ran through from Sandy Hook to Long Branch to Eatontown Junction and from there down the NJS main line to southern New Jersey. Some service continued to run on the old NJS route from Port Monmouth via Red Bank to Eatontown.

Meanwhile, down in south Jersey, the main line was finally extended to Delaware Bay, but not by the NJS. The Vineland Railway started at the end of the NJS at Atsion, crossed the Camden and Atlantic at Winslow Junction, and reached the agricultural town of Vineland in 1870. This company was backed by Charles K. Landis, the founder of Vineland as a somewhat utopian community. The railway was continued onward to Delaware Bay at Bay Side in 1871. The New Jersey Southern's plan now was to reach Baltimore by means of the Vineland Railway, a boat across Delaware Bay, a railroad across the Delmarva Peninsula, and a boat across Chesapeake Bay, according to a statement issued in 1873 over the signature of Jay Gould, President.

The only lengthy NJS branch in south Jersey ran from Bridgeton to a place called Bivalve, on the Maurice River in Port Norris. It was opened in 1872 by the Bridgeton and Port Norris Railroad, but connected at Bridgeton not with the NJS but with the West Jersey Railroad running to Camden. The principal commodity was oysters, at that time plentiful in the area and much in demand. The NJS did not acquire this line until 1887, after the B&PN company had failed and it was reorganized as the Cumberland and Maurice River Railroad.

Also at this time two connecting lines were built in central Jersey, both from Whitings. The Pemberton and New York Railroad ran west to meet a railroad from Camden near Pemberton. The other, the Tuckerton Railroad, ran southeast to reach the bay towns from Waretown (which was also on the NJS's branch from Lakehurst) to Tuckerton.

Gould lost control of the New Jersey Southern Railroad company in the Panic of 1873 and it went into receivership.

Rail service to the Monmouth County coast was revolutionized by the opening of the New York and Long Branch Railroad (NY&LB) in 1875 from Perth Amboy to Long Branch. It was the so-called "all rail route" from Jersey City, operated by the Central Railroad of New Jersey. The NY&LB crossed the NJS original mainline at Red Bank and the NJS mainline via Long Branch on the west side of town at Branchport. This was the third railroad to Long Branch, and it rapidly became the primary route. The time by rail from New York (including a ten-minute ferry ride to Jersey City) was about 1 hour 40 minutes. The "bay route" to Sandy Hook took about 2 hours but writers of the period considered it the more pleasant journey, at least in good weather. The New York and Long Branch was extended by separate companies to Sea Girt in 1876 and Point Pleasant in 1880.

The idea of connecting New York and Philadelphia by the former R&DB was revived for about two years from 1878 to 1880. The rail portion of the new route ran from Sandy Hook via Long Branch, Eatontown, Whitings, and Pemberton to Camden. Travellers could leave New York by boat at 11:00 in the morning and arrive at Philadelphia by ferry at 4:20 in the afternoon. The Pennsylvania Railroad acquired the Pemberton route in 1879, and used it and new construction to create a new route from Camden to Long Branch in 1881, running via a new line from Whitings to Toms River and Seaside Heights and up to the end of the NY&LB at Bay Head Junction, just south of Point Pleasant. The Pennsylvania likewise rerouted the trains from Philadelphia off the NJS in 1880, running instead by a new line to Sea Girt and then up the new NY&LB. The section of the NY&LB from Long Branch to Point Pleasant therefore had trains to both New York and Philadelphia, but not through service, and the possible journeys involving the NJS bay route to Long Branch and a change of trains to the Pennsylvania Railroad were not promoted.

The New Jersey Southern was formally acquired by the Central Railroad of New Jersey in September 1879, although a CNJ timetable of July 1878 shows that the NJS was already operated by the CNJ at that date. The CNJ moved to consolidate operations of the rail and bay routes. A new link was built in 1878 from the NJS Long Branch station, now called East Long Branch, to the NY&LB at West End, on the south end of the town. The main services from New York were now: Jersey City to Point Pleasant over the New York and Long Branch; Sandy Hook to East Long Branch and (via the new link) to Point Pleasant; and Jersey City to southern New Jersey, turning off the New York and Long Branch at Red Bank into the NJS main line. The old NJS main line from Port Monmouth to Red Bank was downgraded to a branch with minimal train service. The NJS line from East Long Branch to Eatontown saw a few trains that allowed passengers to use the bay route and connect at Eatontown for southern New Jersey.

== Southern Division, Central Railroad of New Jersey ==
The last railroad related to the NJS, Atlantic Highlands route, was not built until after the CNJ took over operations. Atlantic Highlands was settled in 1881 as a Methodist camp meeting site, and by 1882 some of the Sandy Hook boats also stopped at the Atlantic Highlands pier. The railroad from Matawan on the New York and Long Branch was opened to Keyport by the Freehold and New York Railroad in 1880 and extended by the locally financed New York and Atlantic Highlands Railroad to Atlantic Highlands in August 1889. The route crossed the old NJS line to Port Monmouth at Belford, and a track connection was made there. The record is no longer clear, but it appears that in addition to the primary service from Jersey City to Atlantic Highlands by rail, some trains also operated in connection with boats from New York, running from Atlantic Highlands pier down the old NJS to Red Bank and Eatontown. A notice from 1892 reports special trains to Monmouth Park Racetrack running this way. The Atlantic Highlands route was further extended along the shoreline to the Shrewsbury River in 1890. The Central Railroad of New Jersey acquired the entire route in 1889.

The connection between Atlantic Highlands and the New Jersey Southern routes was made in 1892 with the construction of a railroad bridge over the Shrewsbury River and the closing of the Sandy Hook boat docks. Sandy Hook was a military base, Fort Hancock, and more land was now needed for weapons testing, so the dock and railroad that had been allowed on the federal property now had to go. From May 1892, the boats now ran to Atlantic Highlands, only, and the shore trains ran from there, over the new bridge, and down the old route to East Long Branch. For more than forty years this routing via Atlantic Highlands continued to be known as the Sandy Hook Route. As explained only the portion along the shore was part of the NJS, and even that was not part of the original Raritan and Delaware Bay Railroad.

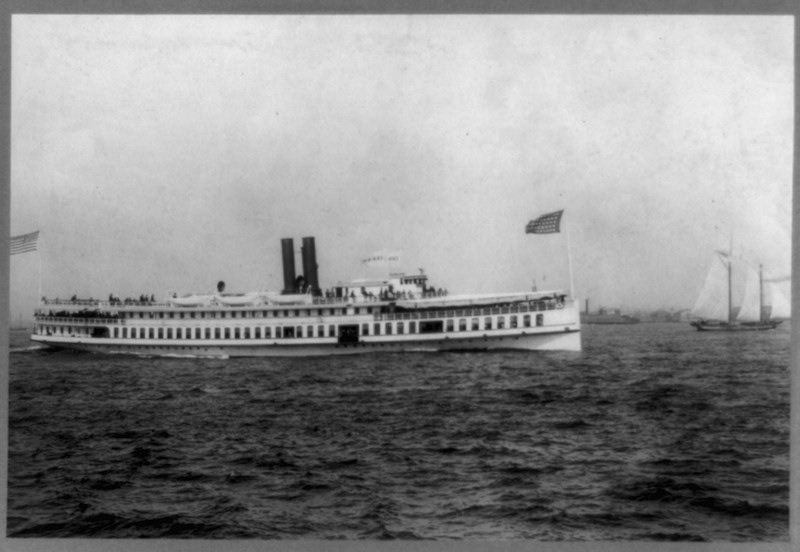
SS Asbury Park

The bay route was shut down in the cold months by some date in the 1880s. Some all-rail trains to Atlantic Highlands continued on to East Long Branch, and in the off season they were the only train service.

However, from May to October the bay route was very busy indeed, with summer resident commuters, vacationers, and day visitors. For many years boats left Pier 10 North River, adjacent to the CNJ ferry slips at the Liberty Street Ferry Terminal, at 04:30, 10:15, 15:45, and 17:00, taking about an hour to reach Atlantic Highlands. The service was operated by two boats, Monmouth, built in 1888, and Sandy Hook, 1889. As summer traffic continued to increase, a third boat, Asbury Park, was added in 1903, and a new stop was added at Pier 81 North River (42nd St) in 1905. Information available for the summer of 1915 shows nine round trips, and most boat trips connected at Atlantic Highlands with four boat trains: a Point Pleasant express, a Long Branch express, a Long Branch local, and a shuttle to Atlantic Highlands. Extra trains were sometimes added to accommodate crowds, particularly northbound on Sunday nights. A few Long Branch express trains continued to Eatontown to connect with trains to southern New Jersey.

Asbury Park, the largest boat, was sold after the 1916 season as no longer needed. The two older boats were kept running well into the automobile age, but Monmouth was retired after 1938 as worn out, leaving only Sandy Hook, which made the last run on the bay route in 1941. Sandy Hook went into war service in 1943 and was sold in 1946 for a hefty $75,000. Any hopes for a resumption of service after the war had been dashed when a hurricane in September 1944 destroyed both the Atlantic Highlands pier and parts of the railroad along the shore to the Shrewsbury River. The railroad along the shore was rebuilt, but did not last much longer. Passenger service from Highlands over the Shrewsbury River bridge and south to East Long Branch was eliminated in 1945. This ended passenger operations over the original Long Branch and Sea Shore Railroad and the original Long Branch branch of the Delaware and Raritan Bay Railroad, built in 1865 and 1860 respectively. Passenger service was cut back to Atlantic Highlands in 1958 and eliminated (Matawan to Atlantic Highlands) in 1966, however freight service on the Atlantic Highlands branch limped into 1972. In the 1990s, most of the route from Matawan to Atlantic Highlands was made into the Henry Hudson Trail.

The portion of the old NJS from Port Monmouth to Red Bank was abandoned at a now obscure date in the early 20th century. A map and timetable from January 1910 no longer shows it as part of the railroad. The property may have been held together for some time longer. Although this section has been closed for over a century, it can still be traced easily in satellite images by following power line right of ways from the Navesink River between Red Bank and Middletown just east of NJ State Route 35, north across Middletown and through Belford, then towards the shore of Port Monmouth east of the existing pier. Satellite images also reveal a branch in the Compton Creek marshes heading east towards previous and current fish processing facilities.

The most well-known trains on the NJS mainline were the fast trains between Jersey City and Atlantic City. "The first direct fast train ever run from New-York to Atlantic City" was inaugurated in January 1889, running down the New York and Long Branch Railroad to Red Bank, the Southern Division to Winslow Junction, and the Atlantic City Railroad, which was acquired by the CNJ in 1883 (and later transferred to the Reading Company). Atlantic City had long been a vacation spot for Philadelphia, while New Yorkers had gone to shore points on Long Island or the coast near Long Branch. The Pennsylvania Railroad (PRR) operated through parlor cars from Jersey City (Exchange Place), but by way of Camden, where the cars were switched to Atlantic City trains on the PRR-owned Camden and Atlantic Railroad (the same road that once connected with the NJS predecessor, the Raritan and Delaware Bay Railroad). The PRR later started running through trains from Jersey City to Atlantic City, notably, the Nellie Bly, as early as 1901. The CNJ management decided in 1928 to recover some of the luxury passengers with trains called the Blue Comet, which started operating two round trips a day starting in February 1929. Trains covered the 136 miles (220 km) in 168 minutes, including running at 70 miles per hour (100 km/h) on the NJS from Red Bank to Winslow Junction. The service was rerouted to the former Camden and Atlantic Railroad line in 1933 when the Pennsylvania Railroad and Reading Company system's combined their southern New Jersey services as the Pennsylvania-Reading Seashore Lines, and the Blue Comet was cut back in 1934 to one round trip a day except in the summer, because of economic conditions. Continuing decline in ridership led to cancellation in September 1941.

A timetable of May 1945 shows passenger service cut back to two round trips a day from Jersey City to Red Bank, down the NJS to Lakehurst, and the Toms River branch to Barnegat. The remainder south was for freight only. The last regular passenger service on the former NJS ended in 1957. The very last passenger train was probably a special run to Toms River in 1972.

== Conrail and beyond ==
The Central Railroad of New Jersey was among the railroads merged into Conrail in April 1976. Conrail began closing segments of the former NJS, and in 1978 severed the main line by abandoning the stretch through the Pine Barrens from Lakehurst to Winslow Junction. The Toms River branch (diverging at Lakehurst) was closed by 1988. Freight service remains on the NJS main line from Red Bank to Lakewood as part of Conrail's Southern Secondary line. The line from Winslow Junction to Vineland is run by the SRNJ, The line south of Landisville is out of service after it was damaged by floods in 2003.

New Jersey Transit proposed passenger service over parts of the NJS in 1996 as a project called MOM (Monmouth Ocean Middlesex). The first draft environmental impact statement was released in 2003. The three study routings run south to the current end of operable track at Lakehurst. One branches off the former New York & Long Branch, now called the North Jersey Coast Line, at Red Bank as NJS trains did. The Boards of Chosen Freeholders (county governments) for Monmouth and Ocean Counties both announced a preference in 2006 for the Monmouth Junction routing, which branches off the Northeast Corridor Line south of New Brunswick and runs over what is now a freight line via Jamesburg and Freehold, entering the former NJS at Farmingdale. The Middlesex County Board of Chosen Freeholders opposed the Monmouth Junction routing, and received support from Governor Jon Corzine early in 2008. Residents of Jamesburg, where the railroad runs in a grassy island in the middle of the main street, were particularly opposed. In September 2008, objections were raised for the first time to the routing based on its path across Monmouth Battlefield State Park. Another draft environmental impact statement was to be released in 2009.

== See also ==
- Southern Secondary (railway)
- Southern Railroad of New Jersey
- List of defunct New Jersey railroads
- List of Central Railroad of New Jersey precursors
