= Millhurst =

Millhurst may refer to:

- Millhurst, Edmonton, Canada
- Millhurst, New Jersey, United States
