= Monmouth Heights, New Jersey =

Monmouth Heights, New Jersey may refer to:

- Monmouth Heights, Manalapan, New Jersey
- Monmouth Heights, Marlboro, New Jersey
