= Yorketown =

Yorketown may refer to:

- Yorketown, New Jersey
- Yorketown, South Australia
