= Yorketown, New Jersey =

Populated place in Monmouth County, New Jersey, US

- Census-designated place
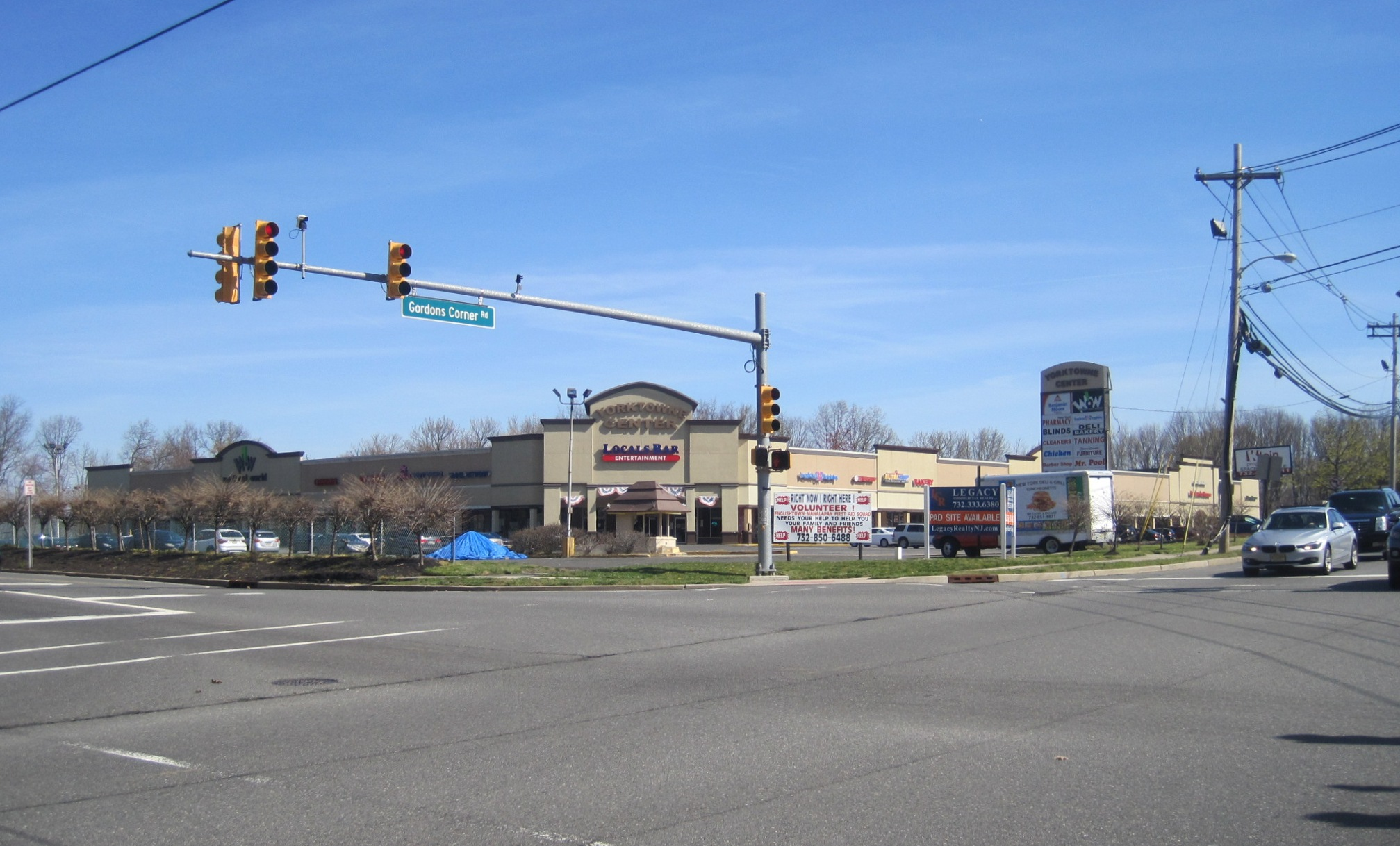
- Yorketown Center shopping plaza

- Map of Yorketown highlighted within Monmouth County. Right: Location of Monmouth County in New Jersey.

- Location in Monmouth County Location in New Jersey Location in the United States
- Coordinates: 40.305904°N 74.338899°W
- Country: United States
- State: New Jersey
- County: Monmouth
- Township: Manalapan

Area
  - Total: 2.40 sq mi (6.21 km^{2})
  - Land: 2.39 sq mi (6.18 km^{2})
  - Water: 0.0077 sq mi (0.02 km^{2}) 0.39%
- Elevation: 95 ft (29 m)

Population (2020)
  - Total: 6,617
  - Density: 2,770.94/sq mi (1,069.87/km^{2})
- Time zone: UTC−05:00 (Eastern (EST))
  - Summer (DST): UTC−04:00 (Eastern (EDT))
- ZIP Code: 07726 (Englishtown)
- Area codes: 732/848
- FIPS code: 34-83245
- GNIS feature ID: 02390550

Yorketown is an unincorporated community and census-designated place (CDP) within Manalapan Township, in Monmouth County, in the U.S. state of New Jersey. As of the 2020 census, the CDP's population was 6,617.

== Geography ==
Yorketown is close to the northwestern border of Monmouth County and is in the northern part of Manalapan Township. It is bordered to the southwest by the borough of Englishtown. It is 5 miles (8 km) northwest of Freehold, the Monmouth county seat, and 4 miles (6 km) southwest of Robertsville.

According to the U.S. Census Bureau, Yorketown has a total area of 2.397 square miles (6.21 km^{2}), including 2.388 square miles (6.18 km^{2}) of land and 0.009 square miles (0.023 km^{2}) of water (0.39%).

== Demographics ==
Historical population
| Census | Pop. | Note | %± |
|---|---|---|---|
| 1980 | 5,330 | | — |
| 1990 | 6,313 | | 18.4% |
| 2000 | 6,712 | | 6.3% |
| 2010 | 6,535 | | −2.6% |
| 2020 | 6,617 | | 1.3% |
Population sources: 1950 1960 1970; 1980 1990 2000; 2010 2020

Yorketown first appeared as a census designated place in the 1980 U.S. census.

=== 2020 census ===
As of the 2020 census, Yorketown had a population of 6,617. The median age was 42.4 years. 22.4% of residents were under the age of 18 and 15.9% of residents were 65 years of age or older. For every 100 females there were 96.9 males, and for every 100 females age 18 and over there were 95.0 males age 18 and over.

100.0% of residents lived in urban areas, while 0.0% lived in rural areas.

There were 2,030 households in Yorketown, of which 41.0% had children under the age of 18 living in them. Of all households, 73.2% were married-couple households, 9.4% were households with a male householder and no spouse or partner present, and 15.1% were households with a female householder and no spouse or partner present. About 11.1% of all households were made up of individuals and 6.1% had someone living alone who was 65 years of age or older.

There were 2,075 housing units, of which 2.2% were vacant. The homeowner vacancy rate was 0.6% and the rental vacancy rate was 5.6%.

Racial composition as of the 2020 census
| Race | Number | Percent |
|---|---|---|
| White | 5,641 | 85.3% |
| Black or African American | 120 | 1.8% |
| American Indian and Alaska Native | 8 | 0.1% |
| Asian | 247 | 3.7% |
| Native Hawaiian and Other Pacific Islander | 0 | 0.0% |
| Some other race | 145 | 2.2% |
| Two or more races | 456 | 6.9% |
| Hispanic or Latino (of any race) | 552 | 8.3% |

=== 2010 census ===
The 2010 United States census counted 6,535 people, 1,976 households, and 1,769 families in the CDP. The population density was 2,736.3 people per square mile (1,056.5 people/km^{2}). There were 2,014 housing units at an average density of 843.3 units per square mile (325.6 units/km^{2}). The racial makeup was 93.66% (6,121) White, 1.78% (116) Black or African American, 0.06% (4) Native American, 3.00% (196) Asian, 0.02% (1) Pacific Islander, 0.55% (36) from other races, and 0.93% (61) from two or more races. Hispanic or Latino of any race were 5.39% (352) of the population.

Of the 1,976 households, 47.4% had children under the age of 18; 78.4% were married couples living together; 8.1% had a female householder with no husband present and 10.5% were non-families. Of all households, 9.1% were made up of individuals and 3.6% had someone living alone who was 65 years of age or older. The average household size was 3.24 and the average family size was 3.46.

27.6% of the population were under the age of 18, 7.9% from 18 to 24, 22.3% from 25 to 44, 31.7% from 45 to 64, and 10.4% who were 65 years of age or older. The median age was 40.2 years. For every 100 females, the population had 95.6 males. For every 100 females ages 18 and older there were 93.9 males.

=== 2000 census ===
At the 2000 census there were 6,712 people, 1,950 households, and 1,790 families living in the CDP. The population density was 1,079.8 people/km^{2} (2,797 people/mi^{2}). There were 1,967 housing units at an average density of 316.4 units/km^{2} (819 units/mi^{2}). The racial makeup of the CDP was 93.79% White, 2.22% African American, 0.04% Native American, 2.53% Asian, 0.04% Pacific Islander, 0.33% from other races, and 1.04% from two or more races. Hispanic or Latino of any race were 3.52% of the population.

Of the 1,950 households 53.4% had children under the age of 18 living with them, 82.4% were married couples living together, 7.1% had a female householder with no husband present, and 8.2% were non-families. 6.7% of households were one person and 2.1% were one person aged 65 or older. The average household size was 3.40 and the average family size was 3.56.

The age distribution was 31.3% under the age of 18, 6.2% from 18 to 24, 29.1% from 25 to 44, 25.5% from 45 to 64, and 7.8% 65 or older. The median age was 37 years. For every 100 females, there were 95.2 males. For every 100 females age 18 and over, there were 93.9 males.

The median household income was $89,351 and the median family income was $95,430. Males had a median income of $70,789 versus $42,295 for females. The per capita income for the CDP was $31,132. About 2.0% of families and 2.7% of the population were below the poverty line, including 3.9% of those under age 18 and 8.2% of those age 65 or over.
