= Deborah Berger =

American female artist (1956–2005)

- Born: 1956; Englishtown, New Jersey, U.S.
- Died: May 21, 2005 (aged 48–49); New Orleans, Louisiana, U.S.
- Known for: Knitting; Crochet
- Movement: Outsider art

Deborah Berger (1956 – May 21, 2005) was an American artist noted for her oeuvre of brightly colored textile works created in knitting and crochet. She is considered an outsider artist and a prodigy.

== Life ==
Deborah Berger was born in 1956 in Englishtown, New Jersey. Berger was autistic and attended boarding schools for special needs children in Texas and Pennsylvania.

== Work ==
Deborah Berger started knitting as a young child. By the age of ten she was creating garments for herself. Wearable works were the focus of much of her creative production.

== Recognition ==
Berger's work, over 100 pieces including wearable garments, baskets, blankets, games and masks, was discovered by her family after her death in New Orleans in 2005. The New Orleans Museum of Art inventoried the works, and archival documents pertaining to Berger's work and life, and a selection was sent to the American Visionary Art Museum in Baltimore.

== Collections and exhibits ==
Deborah Berger's work is primarily held in the American Visionary Art Museum in Baltimore, Maryland. Her pieces have been lent to other institutions for exhibitions, including the 2015 exhibit When the Curtain Never Comes Down at the American Folk Art Museum.
