= Manalapan-Englishtown Regional School District =

School district in Monmouth County, New Jersey, US

Address
- 54 Main Street Englishtown, Monmouth County, New Jersey, 07726; United States
- Coordinates: 40.294444°N 74.358163°W

District information
- Grades: PreK-8
- Established: 1963
- Superintendent: Nicole Santora
- Business administrator: Veronica Wolf
- Schools: 8

Students and staff
- Enrollment: 4,653 (as of 2023–24)
- Faculty: 374.1 FTEs
- Student–teacher ratio: 12.4:1

Other information
- District Factor Group: GH
- Website: www.mersnj.us
Ind.	Per pupil	District spending	Rank (*)	K-8 average	%± vs. average
1A	Total Spending	$16,904	35	$18,891	−10.5%
1	Budgetary Cost	13,320	32	14,159	−5.9%
2	Classroom Instruction	7,952	27	8,659	−8.2%
6	Support Services	1,882	25	2,167	−13.2%
8	Administrative Cost	1,404	26	1,547	−9.2%
10	Operations & Maintenance	1,839	67	1,612	14.1%
13	Extracurricular Activities	68	21	104	−34.6%
16	Median Teacher Salary	61,869	49	61,136
Data from NJDoE 2014 Taxpayers' Guide to Education Spending. *Of K-8 districts with more than 750 students. Lowest spending=1; Highest=84

The Manalapan-Englishtown Regional School District is a regional public school district serving students in pre-kindergarten through eighth grade from the suburban communities of Englishtown and Manalapan Township in Monmouth County, in the U.S. state of New Jersey.

As of the 2023–24 school year, the district, comprised of eight schools, had an enrollment of 4,653 students and 374.1 classroom teachers (on an FTE basis), for a student–teacher ratio of 12.4:1.

Students from the two communities in public school for ninth through twelfth grades attend either Manalapan High School (all students from Englishtown and some from Manalapan) or Freehold Township High School (which serves other Manalapan students), as part of the Freehold Regional High School District. The Freehold Regional High School District also serves students from Colts Neck Township, Farmingdale, Freehold Borough, Freehold Township, Howell Township and Marlboro Township. As of the 2023–24 school year, Manalapan High School had an enrollment of 1,740 students and 115.0 classroom teachers (on an FTE basis), for a student–teacher ratio of 15.1:1 and Freehold Township High School had an enrollment of 1,902 students and 125.8 classroom teachers, for a ratio of 15.1:1.

== History ==
In June 1963, voters approved a referendum by a more than 10-1 margin changing from a consolidated to a regional district. The approval of the regionalization proposal meant that the district was eligible for increased state aid and would have property taxes allocated to the two municipalities based on the number of students enrolled from each community.

Covering an area of 31 square miles (80 km^{2}), the district had 1,140 students in 1963. Population growth in the two constituent municipalities has led to enrollment growing to 3,200 by the early 1980s to more than 5,000 in 2017. The student body is primarily from Manalapan Township, which accounts for about 95% of enrollment, with Englishtown students accounting for the remaining 5%.

After the 1960 United States census, Manalapan Township accounted for 78% of the district's overall population, with 22% from Englishtown. The population in Englishtown increased from 1,143 in 1960 to 1,847 in 2010, an increase of more than 60%, while Manalapan Township grew almost tenfold, from 3,990 to 38,872, over that same period, so that the population ratio between Manalapan Township and Englishtown is nearly 20:1.

The district had been classified by the New Jersey Department of Education as being in District Factor Group "GH", the third-highest of eight groupings. District Factor Groups organize districts statewide to allow comparison by common socioeconomic characteristics of the local districts. From lowest socioeconomic status to highest, the categories are A, B, CD, DE, FG, GH, I and J.

== Awards and recognition ==
Clarks Mills School was one of nine schools in New Jersey honored in 2020 by the National Blue Ribbon Schools Program, which recognizes high student achievement.

== Schools ==
Schools in the district (with 2023–24 enrollment from the National Center for Education Statistics) are:

Preschool

- John I. Dawes Early Learning Center with 349 students in grades PreK–K
  - Melissa Foy, principal

Elementary schools

- Clark Mills School with 478 students in grades 1–5
  - Jayme Orlando, principal
- Lafayette Mills School with 427 students in grades 1–5
  - Gregory T. Duffy, principal
- Milford Brook School with 537 students in grades K–5
  - Melissa Tice, principal
- Taylor Mills School with 532 students in grades K–5
  - Lia Camuto, principal
- Wemrock Brook School with 559 students in grades 1–5
  - Rebecca Seery, principal

Middle schools

- Pine Brook School with 596 students in grade 6
  - Julie Szustowicz, principal
- Manalapan-Englishtown Middle School with 1,158 students in grades 7–8
  - Michael Fiorillo, principal

== In the news ==
Starting September 12, 2006, the approximately 1,400 students of Manalapan-Englishtown Middle School had to learn in the elementary and intermediate schools as the district's middle school building was not yet ready for use. Inspections had identified between 100 and 300 code violations, and the school could not be granted a certificate of occupancy. While the building was being completed, students attended school on the school's four-hour day schedule in cafeterias, gymnasiums, auditoriums, and empty classrooms in the elementary and intermediate schools. As of September 25, 2006, students resumed a full day schedule at the Manalapan-Englishtown Middle School.

During the COVID-19 pandemic, the district superintendent John Marciante abided by the New Jersey state government's policies in regards to the wearing of face masks in order to protect the wider community against the spread of the virus. On June 8, 2021, amidst rising summer temperatures, some parents became concerned that wearing masks would become a greater health concern than COVID. A group of such parents gathered during the board of education meeting in the evening of June 8, 2021, to protest, and persuaded the board of education to place Marciante on administrative leave through the end of the academic year, June 22. Immediately after, the board passed a motion to allow each individual parent to decide whether his or her child would attend school without a mask against government policies.

== Administration ==
Core members of the district's administration are:

- Nicole Santora, superintendent
- Veronica Wolf, business administrator and board secretary

== Board of education ==
The district's board of education, comprised of nine members, sets policy and oversees the fiscal and educational operation of the district through its administration. As a Type II school district, the board's trustees are elected directly by voters to serve three-year terms of office on a staggered basis, with three seats up for election each year held (since 2012) as part of the November general election. The board appoints a superintendent to oversee the district's day-to-day operations and a business administrator to supervise the business functions of the district. Seats on the nine-member board are allocated based on population, with eight seats assigned to Manalapan Township and one to Englishtown.
