= Manalapan Township, New Jersey =

Township in Monmouth County, New Jersey, US

- Township
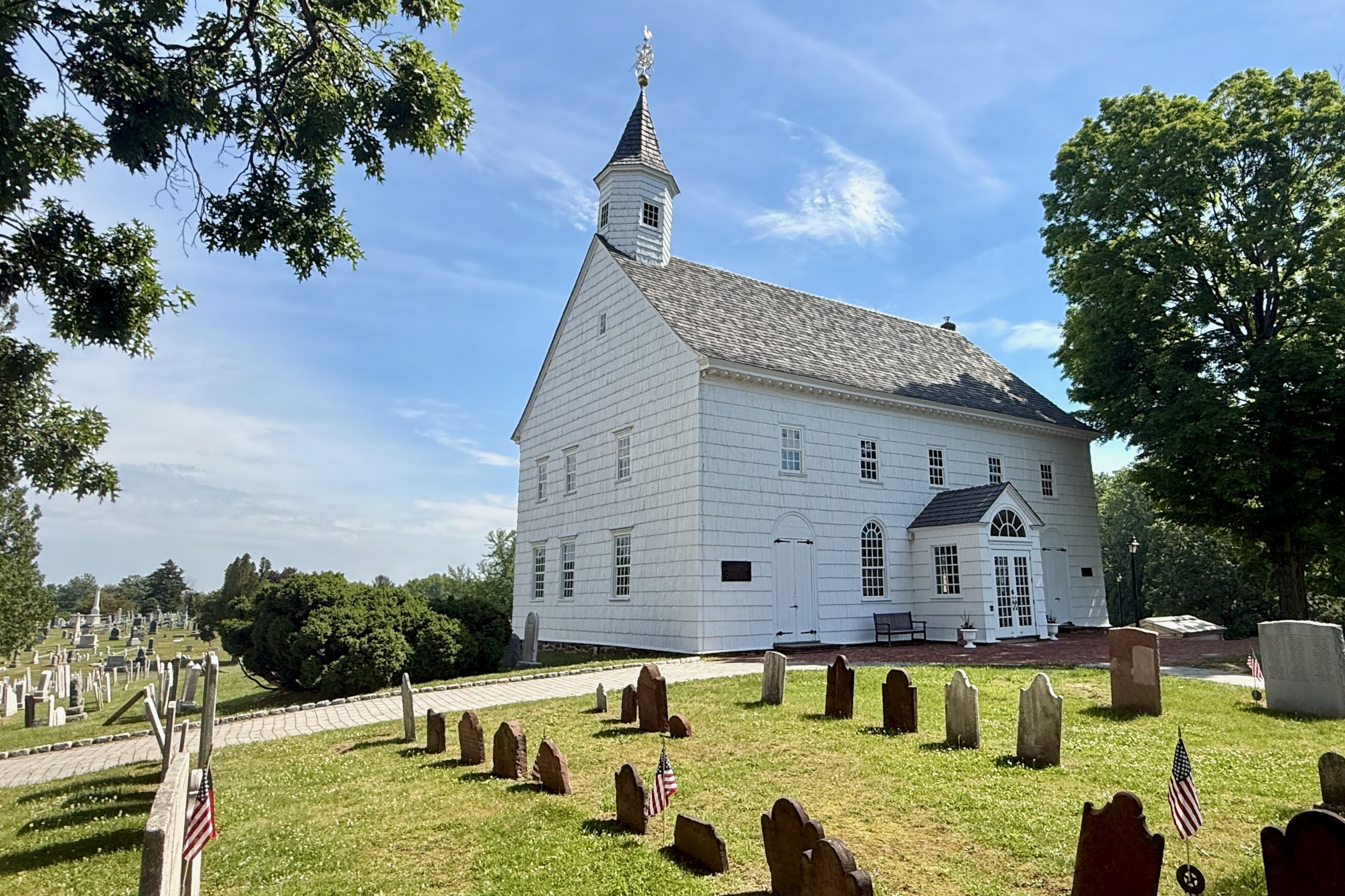
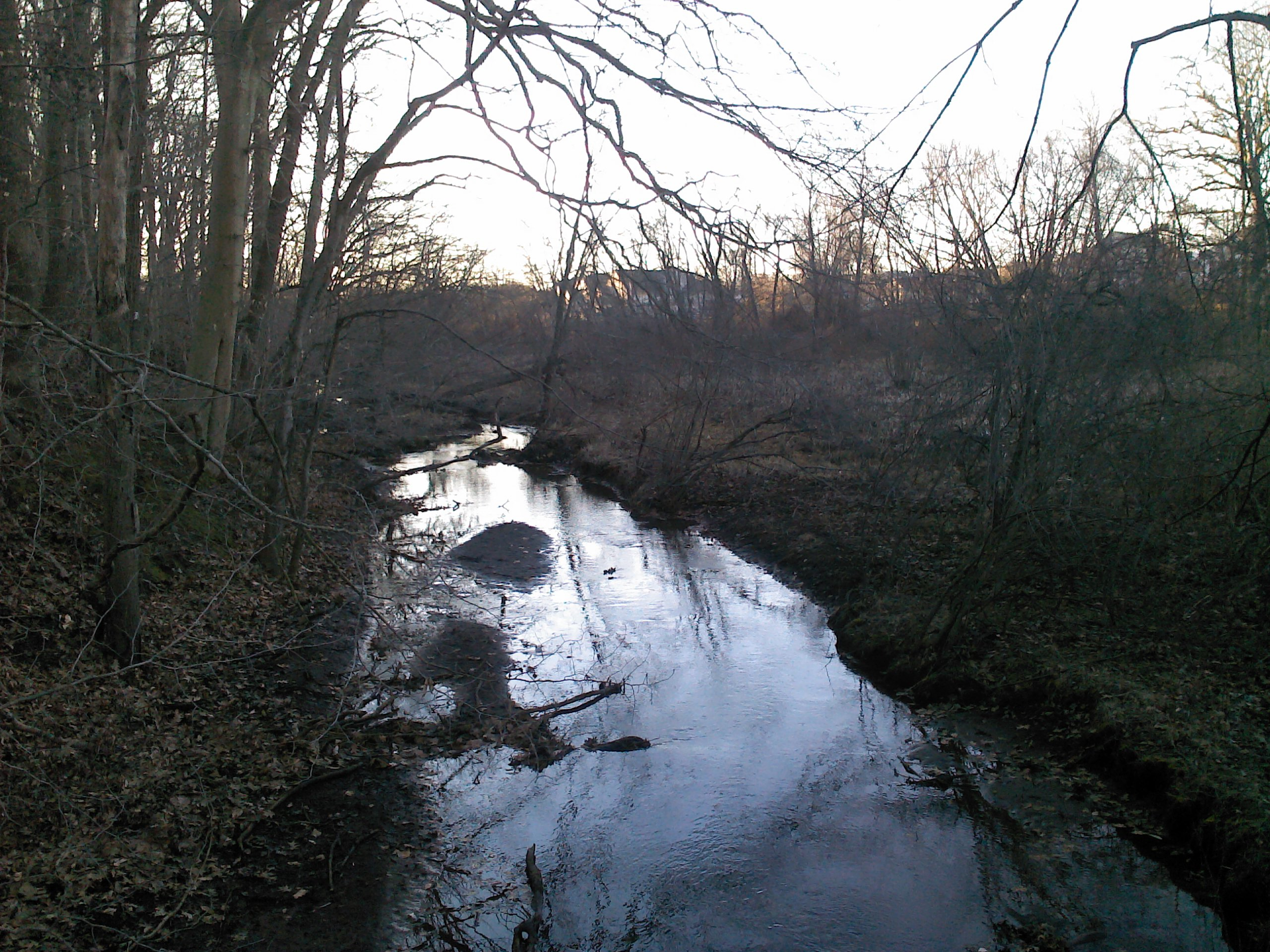
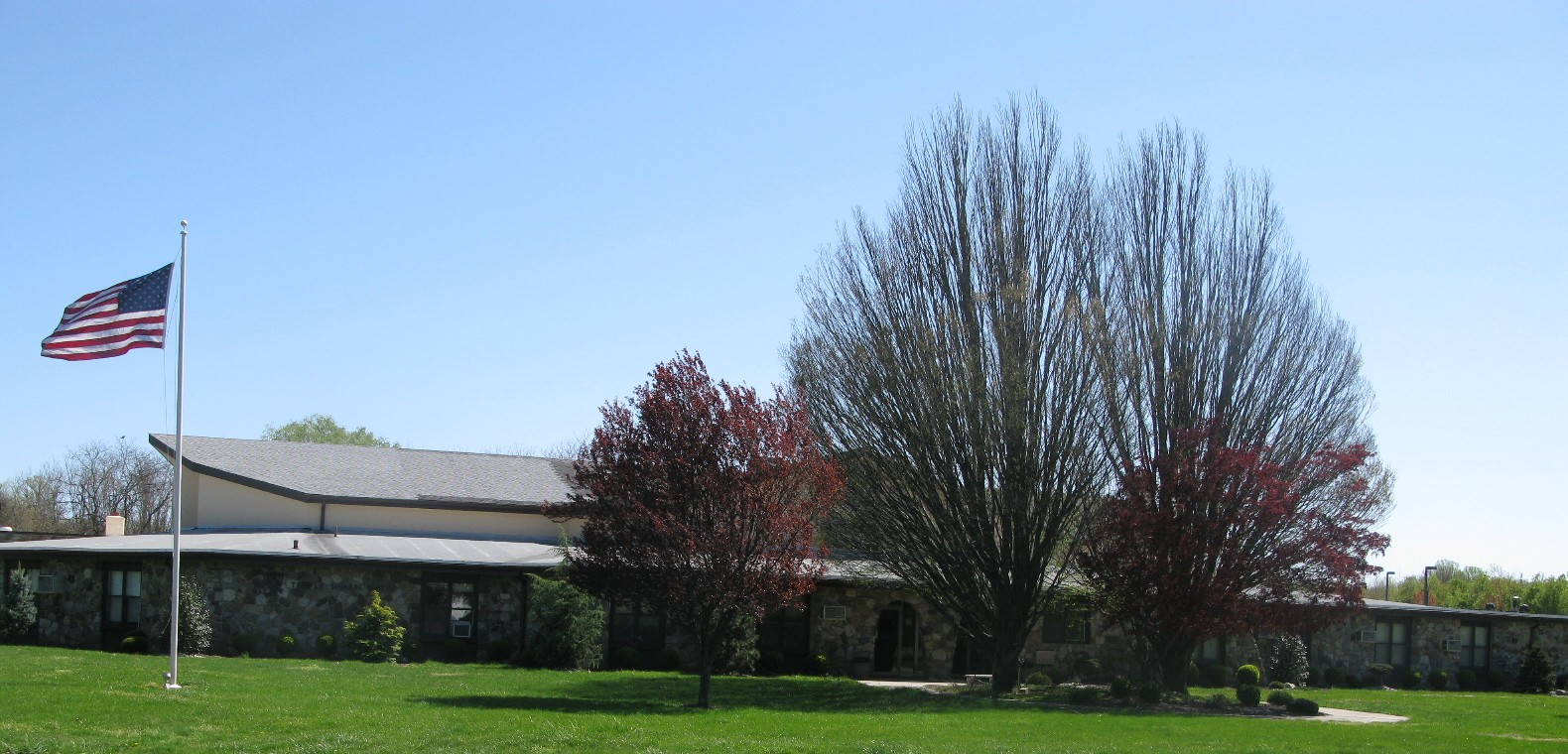
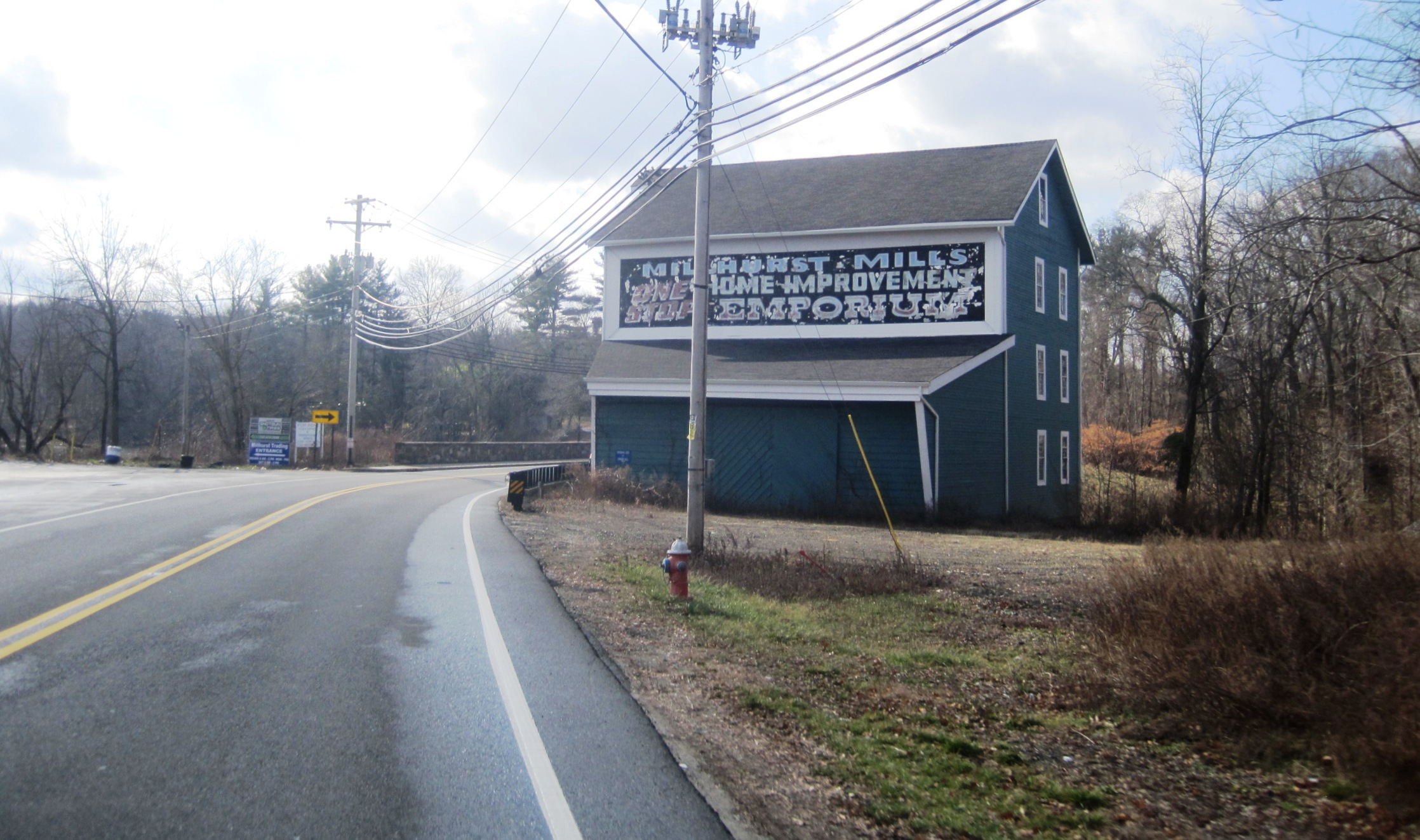
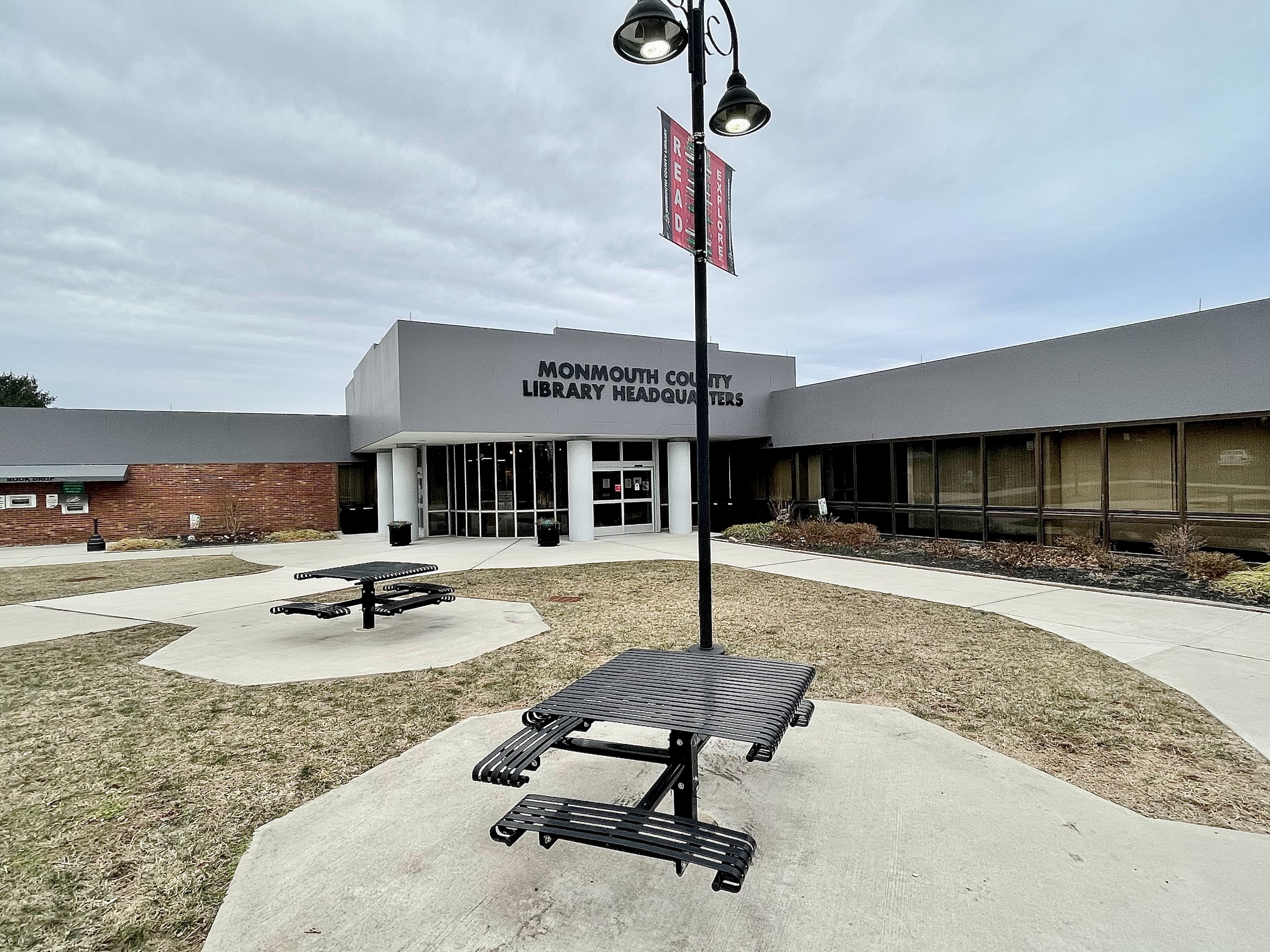
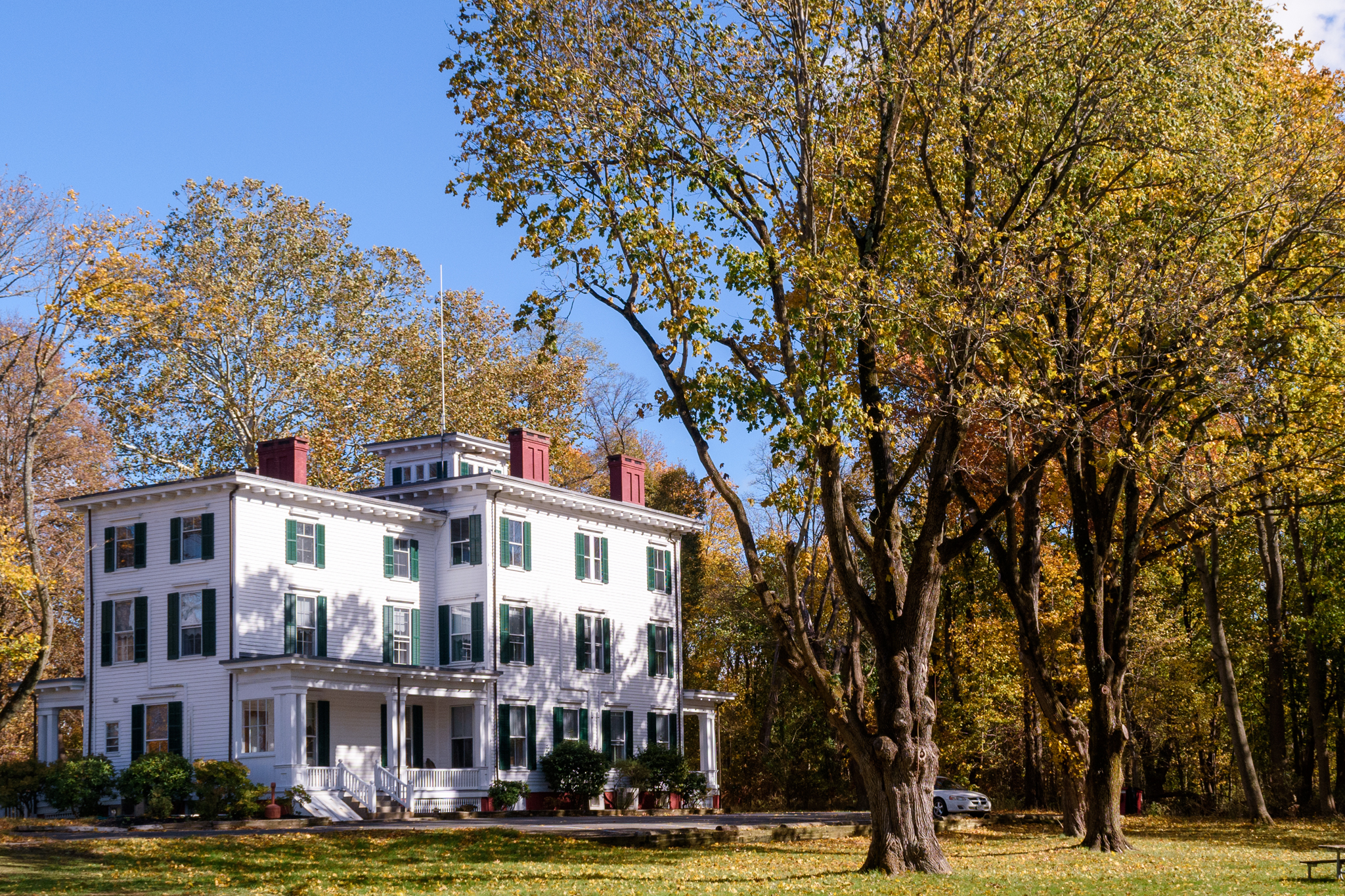
- Monmouth Battlefield State Park Old Tennent Church and Cemetery Manalapan Brook Temple Shaari Emeth Millhurst Mill Monmouth County Library Headquarters Cobb House in the Monmouth Battlefield Historic District

- Seal
- Motto: A great place to live
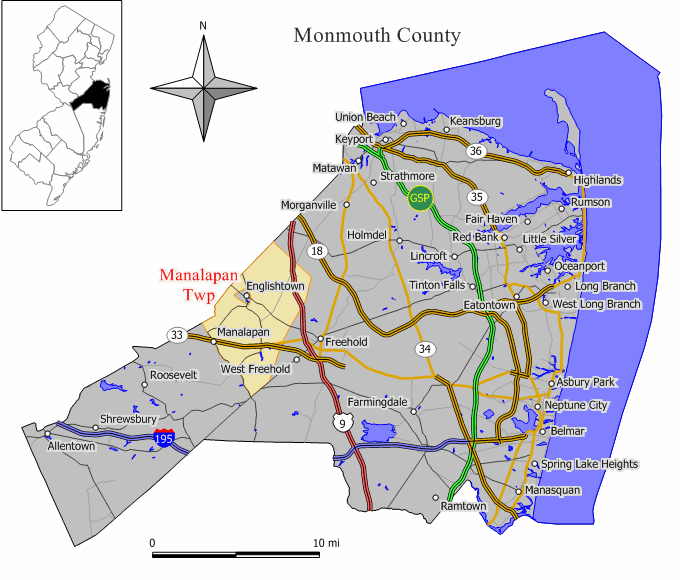
- Location of Manalapan Township in Monmouth County highlighted in yellow (right). Inset map: Location of Monmouth County in New Jersey highlighted in black (left).

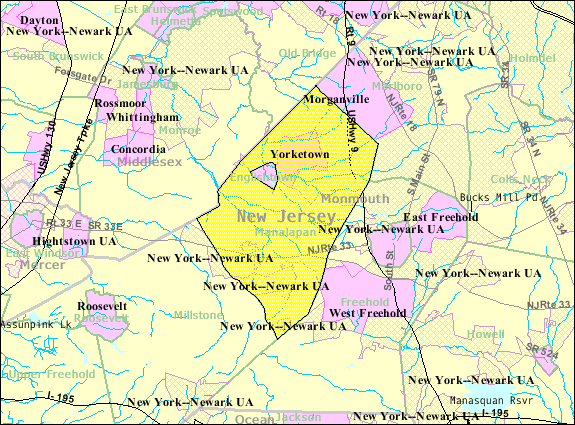
- Census Bureau map of Manalapan Township, New Jersey
- Interactive map of Manalapan Township, New Jersey
- Location in Monmouth County Location in New Jersey Location in the United States
- Coordinates: 40.282353°N 74.346564°W
- Country: United States
- State: New Jersey
- County: Monmouth
- Incorporated: March 9, 1848
- Named for: The Lenape translation of "Manalapan"

Government
  - Type: Township
  - Body: Township Committee
  - Mayor: Eric Nelson (R, term ends December 31, 2025)
  - Administrator: Tara L. Lovrich
  - Municipal clerk: Shari Rose

Area
  - Total: 30.88 sq mi (79.99 km^{2})
  - Land: 30.65 sq mi (79.39 km^{2})
  - Water: 0.23 sq mi (0.60 km^{2}) 0.75%
  - Rank: 85th of 565 in state 8th of 53 in county
- Elevation: 102 ft (31 m)

Population (2020)
  - Total: 40,905
  - Estimate (2025): 40,987 ▲
  - Rank: 58th of 565 in state 4th of 53 in county
  - Density: 1,334.5/sq mi (515.3/km^{2})
  - Rank: 351st of 565 in state 43rd of 53 in county
- Time zone: UTC−05:00 (Eastern (EST))
  - Summer (DST): UTC−04:00 (Eastern (EDT))
- ZIP Code: 07726 – Englishtown
- Area codes: 732/848
- FIPS code: 3402542990
- GNIS feature ID: 0882117
- Website: mtnj.org

Manalapan Township (/məˈnæləpɪn/, mə-NAL-ə-pin) is a township in western Monmouth County, in the U.S. state of New Jersey. The township is centrally located within the Raritan Valley region and is a part of the New York metropolitan area. As of the 2020 United States census, the township's population was 40,905, its highest decennial count ever and an increase of 2,033 (+5.2%) from the 2010 census count of 38,872, which in turn reflected an increase of 5,449 (+16.3%) from the 33,423 counted in the 2000 census.

The name "Manalapan" is derived from a word in the Lenape language that would mean either "land of good bread", "good land to settle upon", "good bread" or "covered swamp with edible roots".

== History ==
The Battle of Monmouth was fought in 1778 on land that is now part of Manalapan and Freehold townships. Monmouth Battlefield State Park occupies 2,928 acres (1,185 ha) in the two townships.

Manalapan Township was formed by an act of the New Jersey Legislature on March 9, 1848, from portions of Freehold Township. Englishtown was formed as a borough from portions of Manalapan on January 4, 1888, based on the results of a referendum held the previous day.

== Geography ==
According to the United States Census Bureau, the township had a total area of 30.88 square miles (79.99 km^{2}), including 30.65 square miles (79.39 km^{2}) of land and 0.23 square miles (0.60 km^{2}) of water (0.75%). The township has an elevation of 82 feet (25 m).

The township completely surrounds Englishtown, making it part of 21 pairs of "doughnut towns" in the state, where one municipality entirely surrounds another. The township borders the municipalities of Freehold Township, Marlboro Township and Millstone Township in Monmouth County; and Monroe Township and Old Bridge Township in Middlesex County.

Yorketown (with a 2020 Census population of 6,617) is an unincorporated community and census-designated place (CDP) located within Manalapan Township.

Other unincorporated communities, localities and place names located partially or completely within the township include Cahills Corners, Clarks Mills, Elton, Gordons Corner, Lafayette Mills, Millhurst, Monmouth Heights, Oakland Mills, Smithburg, Taylors Mills, Tennent, Tracey, Whittier Oaks and Woodville.

=== Ecology ===
According to the A. W. Kuchler U.S. potential natural vegetation types, Manalapan Township would have an Appalachian Oak (104) vegetation type with an Eastern Hardwood Forest (25) vegetation form.

== Demographics ==
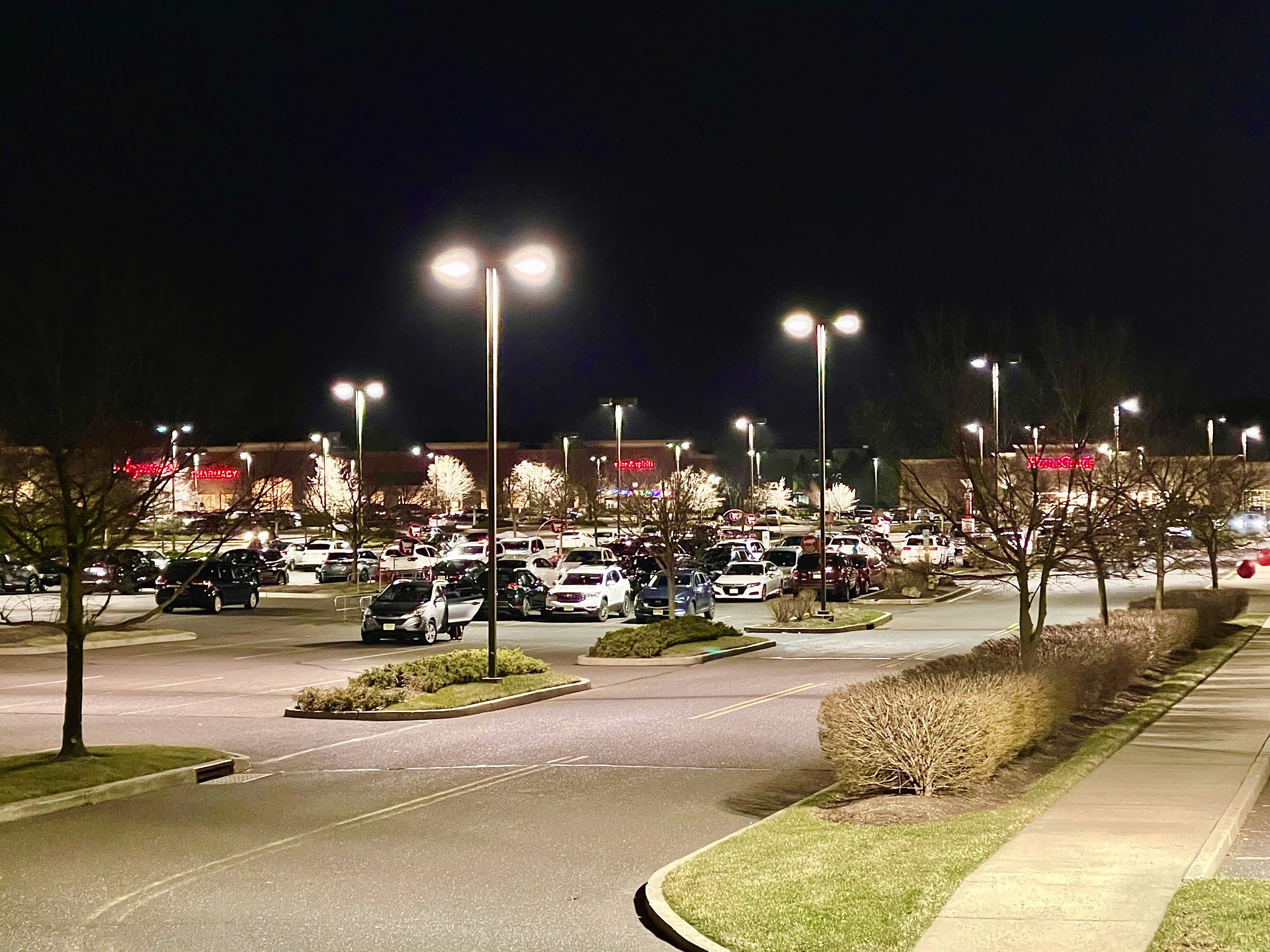
Manalapan EpiCentre at night

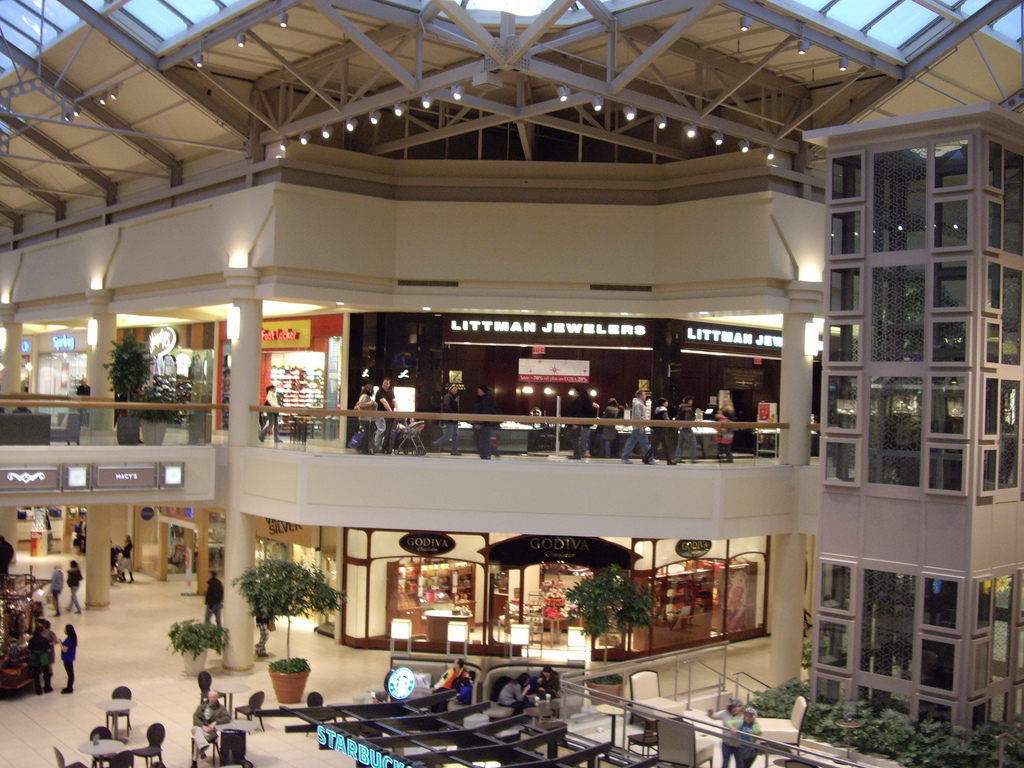
Super-regional shopping mall Freehold Raceway Mall is located in neighboring Freehold Township. It is a major shopping destination for Manalapan residents

Historical population
Census	Pop.	Note	%±
1850	1,910		—
1860	2,374		24.3%
1870	2,286		−3.7%
1880	2,175	*	−4.9%
1890	2,002		−8.0%
1900	1,435		−28.3%
1910	1,375		−4.2%
1920	1,080		−21.5%
1930	1,464		35.6%
1940	1,900		29.8%
1950	3,137		65.1%
1960	3,990		27.2%
1970	14,049		252.1%
1980	18,914		34.6%
1990	26,716		41.2%
2000	33,423		25.1%
2010	38,872		16.3%
2020	40,905		5.2%
2025 (est.)	40,987		0.2%
Population sources: 1850–1920 1850–1870; 1850 1870 1880–1890; 1890–1910 1910–1930; 1940–2000 2000; 2010 2020 and 2025 *= Lost territory in previous decade

=== 2010 census ===
The 2010 United States census counted 38,872 people, 13,263 households, and 10,663 families in the township. The population density was 1,270.0 per square mile (490.3/km^{2}). There were 13,735 housing units at an average density of 448.8 per square mile (173.3/km^{2}). The racial makeup was 88.55% (34,423) White, 2.38% (925) Black or African American, 0.05% (18) Native American, 6.90% (2,682) Asian, 0.02% (7) Pacific Islander, 0.94% (364) from other races, and 1.17% (453) from two or more races. Hispanic or Latino of any race were 5.66% (2,202) of the population.

Of the 13,263 households, 39.6% had children under the age of 18; 70.2% were married couples living together; 7.4% had a female householder with no husband present and 19.6% were non-families. Of all households, 17.3% were made up of individuals and 9.9% had someone living alone who was 65 years of age or older. The average household size was 2.92 and the average family size was 3.32.

25.8% of the population were under the age of 18, 7.5% from 18 to 24, 21.8% from 25 to 44, 32.4% from 45 to 64, and 12.4% who were 65 years of age or older. The median age was 41.7 years. For every 100 females, the population had 93.2 males. For every 100 females ages 18 and older there were 89.9 males.

The Census Bureau's 2006–2010 American Community Survey showed that (in 2010 inflation-adjusted dollars) median household income was $103,970 (with a margin of error of +/− $4,322) and the median family income was $115,292 (+/− $5,344). Males had a median income of $85,086 (+/− $5,699) versus $51,695 (+/− $3,038) for females. The per capita income for the borough was $41,049 (+/− $1,717). About 2.5% of families and 2.8% of the population were below the poverty line, including 3.7% of those under age 18 and 5.4% of those age 65 or over.

=== 2000 census ===
As the 2000 United States census there were 33,423 people, 10,781 households, and 9,002 families residing in the township. The population density was 1,084.6 inhabitants per square mile (418.8/km^{2}). There were 11,066 housing units at an average density of 359.1 per square mile (138.6/km^{2}). The racial makeup of the township was 91.81% White, 1.99% African American, 0.03% Native American, 4.53% Asian, 0.01% Pacific Islander, 0.53% from other races, and 1.10% from two or more races. Hispanic or Latino of any race were 3.54% of the population. Manalapan has large Italian and Jewish communities.

There were 10,781 households, out of which 47.0% had children under the age of 18 living with them, 75.9% were married couples living together, 5.7% had a female householder with no husband present, and 16.5% were non-families. 14.9% of all households were made up of individuals, and 10.4% had someone living alone who was 65 years of age or older. The average household size was 3.09 and the average family size was 3.45.

In the township the population was spread out, with 30.3% under the age of 18, 5.8% from 18 to 24, 27.7% from 25 to 44, 24.5% from 45 to 64, and 11.6% who were 65 years of age or older. The median age was 38 years. For every 100 females, there were 92.2 males. For every 100 females age 18 and over, there were 89.5 males.

The median income for a household in the township was $83,575, and the median income for a family was $94,112. Males had a median income of $72,198 versus $39,921 for females. The per capita income for the township was $32,142. About 3.2% of families and 3.8% of the population were below the poverty line, including 5.1% of those under age 18 and 5.7% of those age 65 or over.

=== Crime ===
Manalapan's crime rate per 1,000 residents had reached a low of 8.4 in 2003 (in data since 1996). After reaching a peak of 12.1 in 2007, the rate dropped each subsequent year, reaching 10.4 in 2010 before an uptick to 10.8 in 2011. The violent crime rate per 1,000 had reached a low of 0.3 in 2005, before climbing to 0.8 in 2007, then declining or remaining level in each succeeding year, reaching a rate of 0.4 in 2011.

In 2008, seven residents of Manalapan were arrested on money laundering and drug trafficking charges for their involvement in an international drug ring bringing in a net of $1 million per month.

== Parks and recreation ==
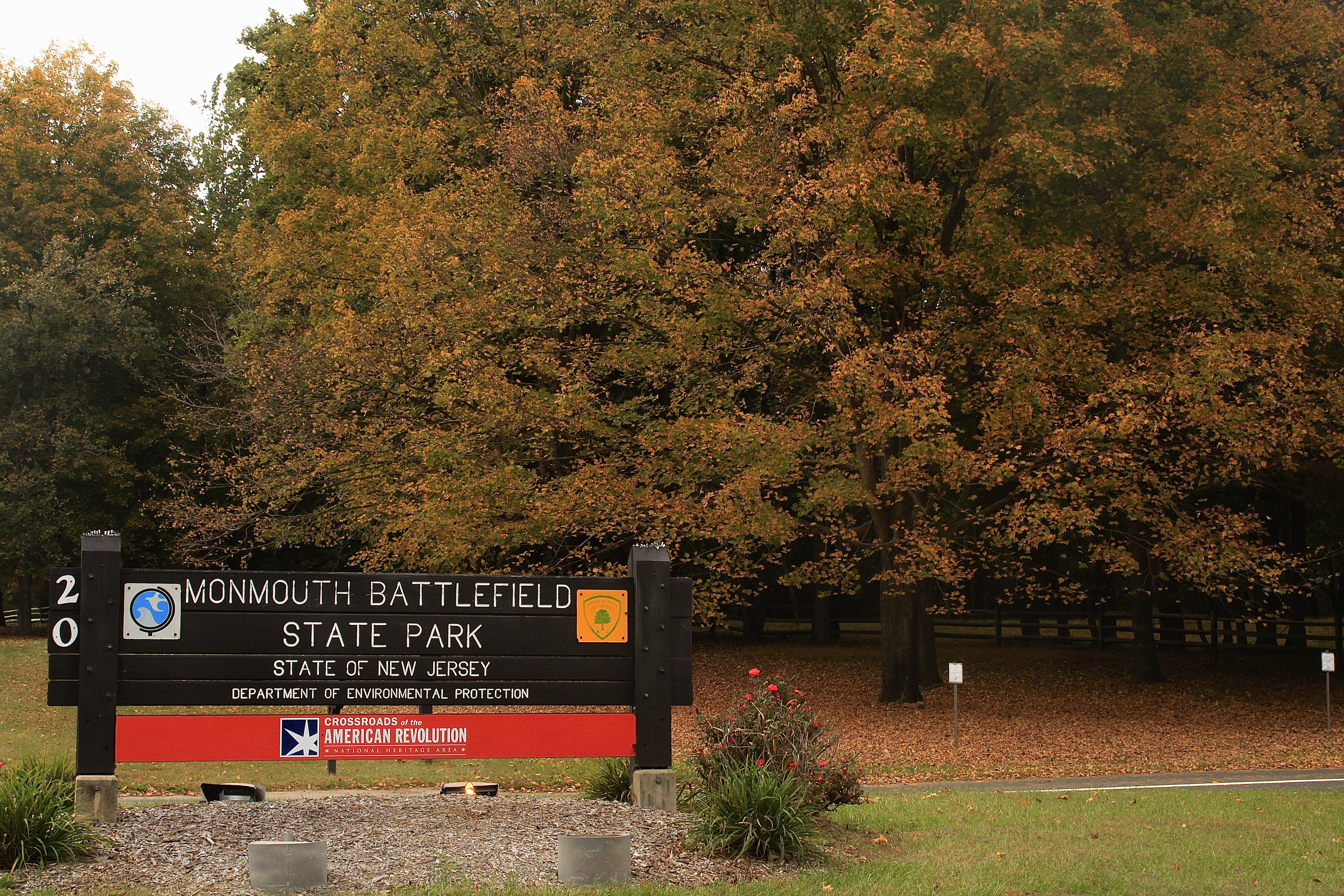
Main entrance to Monmouth Battlefield State Park

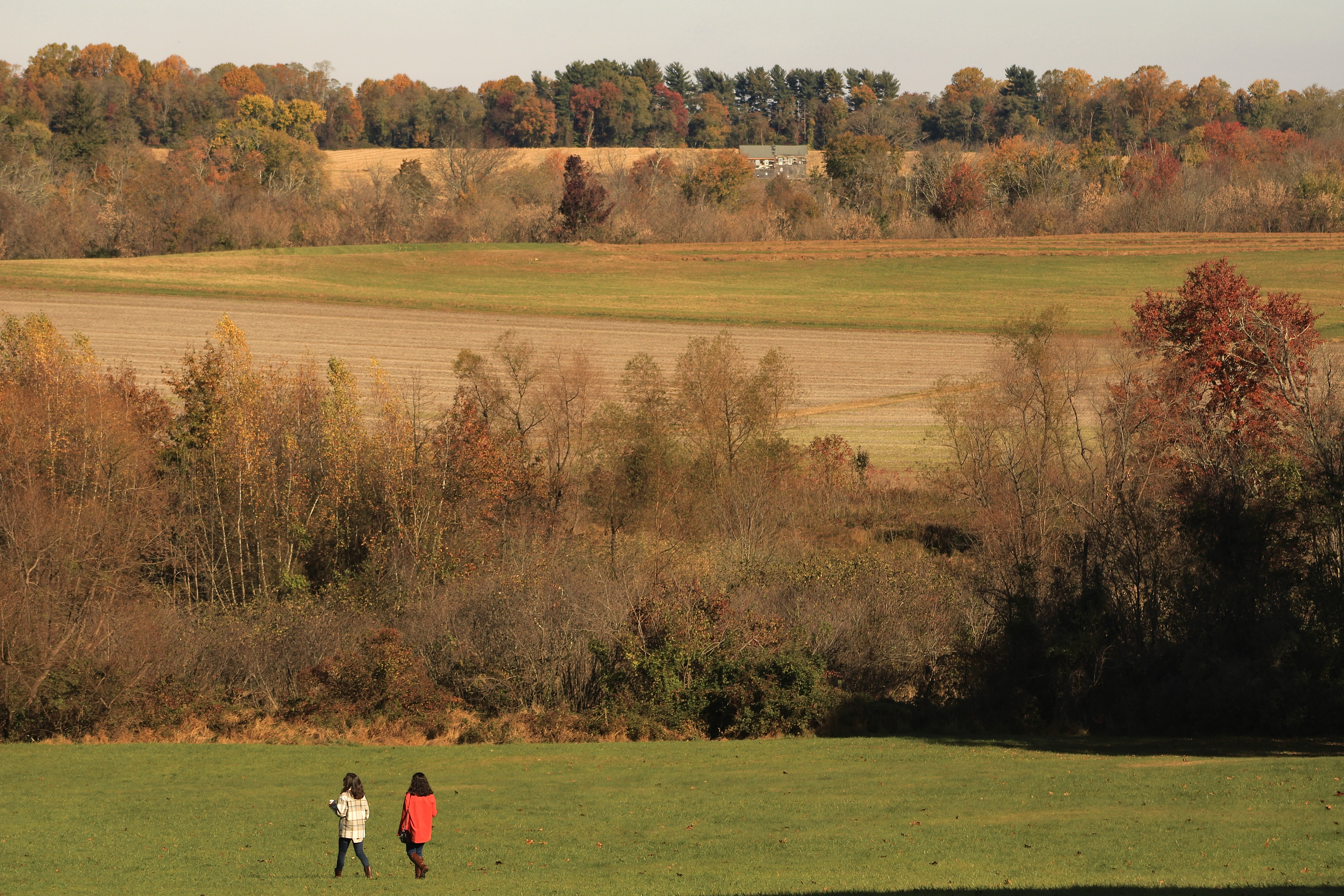
Rolling hills at Monmouth Battlefield State Park

Manalapan's Recreation Center covers 162 acres (66 ha), offering two handball courts, nine softball/baseball fields, five batting cages, a fitness trail, two football fields (one turf), nine football/soccer fields (one turf), two street hockey courts, three tot lots, six basketball courts, six tennis courts, two bocce courts, two sand volleyball courts, a nine-hole disc golf course, a small water park, concession stand, two picnic areas, two maintenance buildings, two shelter buildings and a headquarters building.

== Government ==
=== Local government ===
Manalapan is governed under the Township form of New Jersey municipal government, one of 141 municipalities (of the 564) statewide that use this form, the second-most commonly used form of government in the state. The Township Committee is comprised of five members, who are elected directly by the voters at-large in partisan elections to serve three-year terms of office on a staggered basis, with either one or two seats coming up for election each year as part of the November general election in a three-year cycle. At an annual reorganization meeting, the Township Committee selects one of its members to serve as Mayor and another as Deputy Mayor for one year.

As of 2025, members of the Manalapan Township Committee are Mayor Eric Nelson (R, term as committee and as mayor ends December 31, 2025), Deputy Mayor Mary Ann Musich (R, term on committee and as deputy mayor ends 2025), Susan Cohen (R, 2026), Robert Gregowicz (R, 2027) and John P. "Jack" McNaboe (R, 2026).

=== Federal, state, and county representation ===
Manalapan is located in the 3rd Congressional District and is part of New Jersey's 12th state legislative district.

Prior to the 2010 Census, Manalapan Township had been split between the 6th Congressional District and the 12th Congressional District, a change made by the New Jersey Redistricting Commission that took effect in January 2013, based on the results of the November 2012 general elections.

For the 119th United States Congress, New Jersey's 3rd congressional district is currently represented Herb Conaway (D, Delran Township). New Jersey is represented in the United States Senate by Democrats Cory Booker (Newark, term ends 2027) and Andy Kim (Moorestown, term ends 2031).

For the 2026–2027 session, the 12th legislative district of the New Jersey Legislature is represented in the State Senate by Owen Henry (R, Old Bridge Township) and in the General Assembly by Robert D. Clifton (R, Matawan) and Alex Sauickie (R, Jackson Township).

Monmouth County is governed by a Board of County Commissioners composed of five members who are elected at-large to serve three-year terms of office on a staggered basis, with either one or two seats up for election each year as part of the November general election. At an annual reorganization meeting held in the beginning of January, the board selects one of its members to serve as director and another as deputy director.

As of 2026, Monmouth County's Commissioners are Director Thomas A. Arnone (R, Neptune City, 2028),Deputy Director Nick DiRocco (R, Wall Township, 2028), Susan M. Kiley (R, Hazlet Township, 2027), Erik Anderson (R, Shrewsbury, 2026), and Ross F. Licitra (R, Marlboro Township, 2026).

Constitutional officers elected on a countywide basis are Clerk Christine Giordano Hanlon (R, 2030; Ocean Township), Sheriff Shaun Golden (R, 2028; Howell Township) and Surrogate Maureen Raisch (R, 2026; Middletown Township).

=== Politics ===
United States presidential election results for Manalapan
Year	Republican		Democratic		Third party(ies)	
Year	No.	%	No.	%	No.	%
2024	15,139	62.54%	8,680	35.86%	388	1.60%
2020	14,534	57.07%	10,708	42.05%	224	0.88%
2016	11,905	56.73%	8,542	40.70%	540	2.57%
2012	9,949	54.24%	8,224	44.84%	169	0.92%
2008	10,150	52.61%	8,984	46.56%	160	0.83%
2004	9,254	52.77%	8,185	46.68%	96	0.55%
2000	5,297	36.93%	8,626	60.13%	422	2.94%
1996	4,354	34.01%	7,554	59.00%	895	6.99%
1992	5,224	39.49%	6,138	46.40%	1,867	14.11%

As of March 2011, there were a total of 26,256 registered voters in Manalapan Township, of which 6,925 (26.4%) were registered as Democrats, 4,439 (16.9%) were registered as Republicans and 14,875 (56.7%) were registered as Unaffiliated. There were 17 voters registered as Libertarians or Greens.

In the 2012 presidential election, Republican Mitt Romney received 54.2% of the vote (9,949 cast), ahead of Democrat Barack Obama with 44.8% (8,224 votes), and other candidates with 0.9% (169 votes), among the 18,449 ballots cast by the township's 27,734 registered voters (107 ballots were spoiled), for a turnout of 66.5%. In the 2008 presidential election, Republican John McCain received 51.9% of the vote (10,150 cast), ahead of Democrat Barack Obama with 45.9% (8,984 votes) and other candidates with 0.8% (160 votes), among the 19,553 ballots cast by the township's 26,582 registered voters, for a turnout of 73.6%. In the 2004 presidential election, Republican George W. Bush received 52.2% of the vote (9,254 ballots cast), outpolling Democrat John Kerry with 46.2% (8,185 votes) and other candidates with 0.4% (96 votes), among the 17,730 ballots cast by the township's 23,926 registered voters, for a turnout percentage of 74.1.

Gubernatorial election results for Manalapan
Year	Republican		Democratic		Third party(ies)	
Year	No.	%	No.	%	No.	%
2025	11,244	61.21%	7,042	38.34%	83	0.45%
2021	9,894	63.19%	5,674	36.24%	89	0.57%
2017	6,009	57.66%	4,237	40.65%	176	1.69%
2013	7,640	73.04%	2,688	25.70%	132	1.26%
2009	7,581	62.24%	3,995	32.80%	605	4.97%
2005	5,148	47.88%	5,286	49.16%	318	2.96%

In the 2013 gubernatorial election, Republican Chris Christie received 73.0% of the vote (7,640 cast), ahead of Democrat Barbara Buono with 25.7% (2,688 votes), and other candidates with 1.3% (132 votes), among the 10,583 ballots cast by the township's 28,056 registered voters (123 ballots were spoiled), for a turnout of 37.7%. In the 2009 gubernatorial election, Republican Chris Christie received 61.9% of the vote (7,581 ballots cast), ahead of Democrat Jon Corzine with 32.6% (3,995 votes), Independent Chris Daggett with 4.4% (536 votes) and other candidates with 0.6% (69 votes), among the 12,251 ballots cast by the township's 26,168 registered voters, yielding a 46.8% turnout.

United States Senate election results for Manalapan1
Year	Republican		Democratic		Third party(ies)	
Year	No.	%	No.	%	No.	%
2024	13,867	60.04%	8,761	37.93%	469	2.03%
2018	8,941	56.75%	6,473	41.09%	340	2.16%
2012	9,143	53.00%	7,843	45.46%	265	1.54%
2006	4,685	47.94%	4,912	50.27%	175	1.79%

United States Senate election results for Manalapan2
Year	Republican		Democratic		Third party(ies)	
Year	No.	%	No.	%	No.	%
2020	14,294	57.19%	10,299	41.21%	399	1.60%
2014	4,640	54.00%	3,822	44.48%	131	1.52%
2013	3,127	52.80%	2,755	46.52%	40	0.68%
2008	9,159	51.07%	8,486	47.32%	288	1.61%

== Education ==
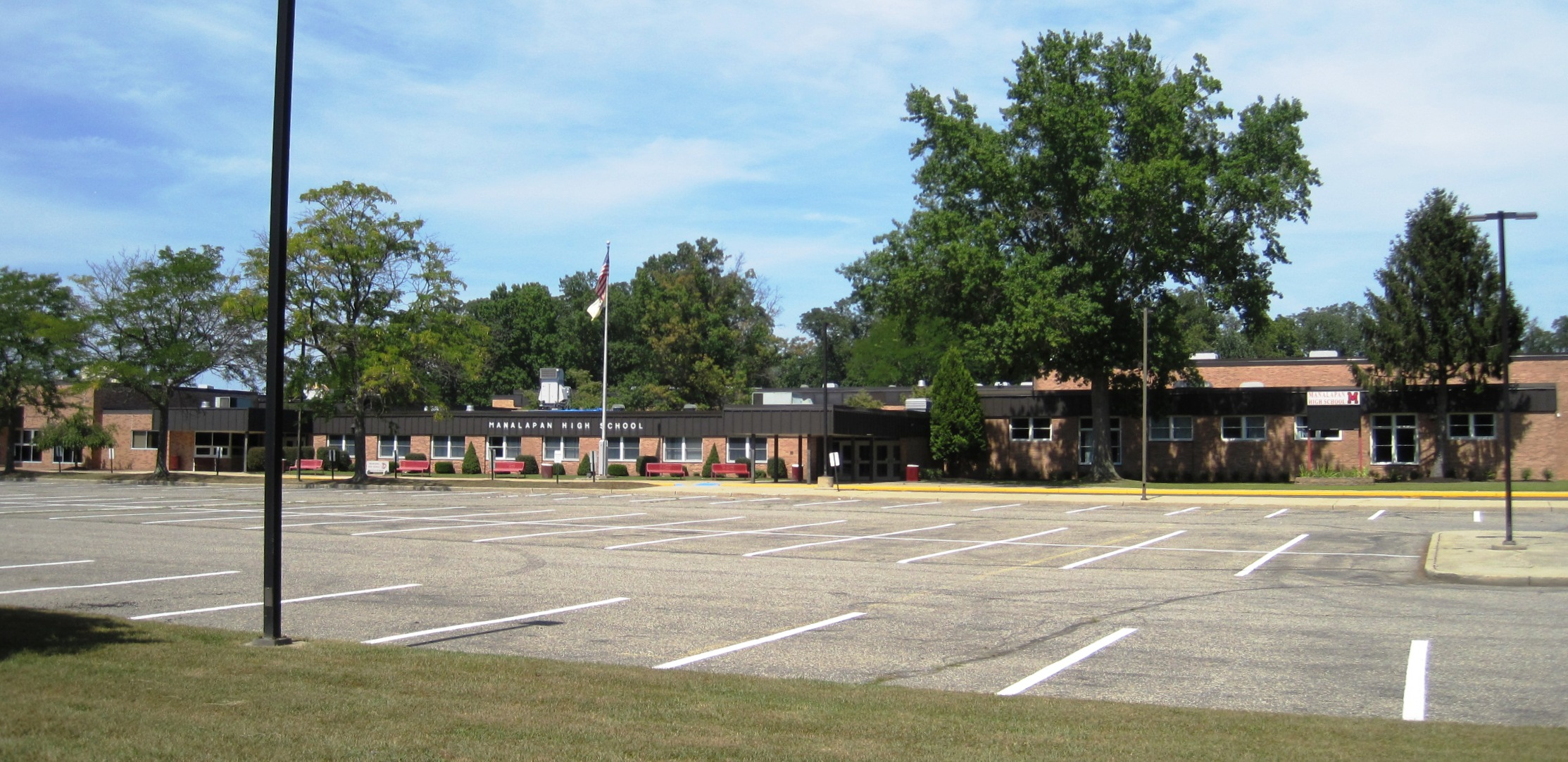
Manalapan High School located on the corner of Church Lane and Englishtown-Freehold Road

Public school students in pre-kindergarten through eighth grade attend the Manalapan-Englishtown Regional School District, which also serves children from Englishtown. As of the 2023–24 school year, the district, comprised of eight schools, had an enrollment of 4,653 students and 374.1 classroom teachers (on an FTE basis), for a student–teacher ratio of 12.4:1. Schools in the district (with 2023–24 enrollment from the National Center for Education Statistics) are John I. Dawes Early Learning Center with 349 students in grades PreK–K, Clark Mills School with 478 students in grades 1–5, Lafayette Mills School with 427 students in grades 1–5, Milford Brook School with 537 students in grades K–5, Taylor Mills School with 532 students in grades K–5, Wemrock Brook School with 559 students in grades 1–5, Pine Brook School with 596 students in grade 6 and Manalapan-Englishtown Middle School with 1,158 students in grades 7–8. The district is overseen by a nine-member board of education, which sets policy and oversees the fiscal and educational operation of the district. Seats on the nine-member board are allocated based on population, with eight seats assigned to Manalapan Township.

Students from Manalapan Township in public school for ninth through twelfth grades attend either Manalapan High School or Freehold Township High School, as part of the Freehold Regional High School District. The Freehold Regional High School District also serves students from Colts Neck Township, Farmingdale, Freehold Borough, Freehold Township, Howell Township and Marlboro Township. As of the 2023–24 school year, Manalapan High School had an enrollment of 1,740 students and 115.0 classroom teachers (on an FTE basis), for a student–teacher ratio of 15.1:1 and Freehold Township High School had an enrollment of 1,902 students and 125.8 classroom teachers, for a ratio of 15.1:1. The FRHSD board of education has nine members, who are elected to three-year terms from each of the constituent districts. Each member is allocated a fraction of a vote that totals to nine points, with Manalapan Township allocated one member, who has 1.4 votes.

Two of the Freehold Regional High School District's magnet programs, Science & Engineering and the Law Enforcement and Public Safety Magnet Program, are housed within Manalapan High School.

Public high school students in Manalapan and all of Monmouth County also have the option of attending one of the Monmouth County Vocational School District's five career academies.

== Historic district ==
The Monmouth Battlefield Historic District is a 1,819-acre (736 ha) historic district within the much larger Monmouth Battlefield State Park, located on both sides of County Route 522 (Freehold-Englishtown Road) and west of U.S. Route 9 on the border of Manalapan Township and Freehold Township.

The site of the battlefield originally contained many colonial-era farmhouses though many did not survive the rapid development of the area in the 20th century. Three of the original seven farmhouses that were present during the battle are still standing in the park. These include the Sutfin Farmhouse (1731); the Rhea-Applegate House (1745); and the Craig House (1746).

Near the battlefield lies the historic meadow creek housing development. Founded in the 2000s by K hovnanian, it has become home to a multitude of Indian and Russian immigrants. It remains a beautiful display of architecture featuring the villages and estates. European style townhouses paired with suburban American houses. The development is renowned for its clubhouse that features sports fields, a lounge, a pool, ping pong, and a gym.

Three other homes were built on the battlefield. The Conover–Perrine House (1832) is to the north of the park, erected on the site of the original 18th-century Perrine House, an important example of late Federal Architecture. The Italianate Cobb House was later constructed in 1872 near the Conover–Perrine House. The Combs' Farmhouse (mid-18th Century) was demolished sometime in the 1960s and was located near the park's playground and ice pond.

The district was added to the National Register of Historic Places on October 15, 1966, for its significance in military history and for the remaining settlement of colonial architecture and agriculture akin to the fated events of the Battle of Monmouth.

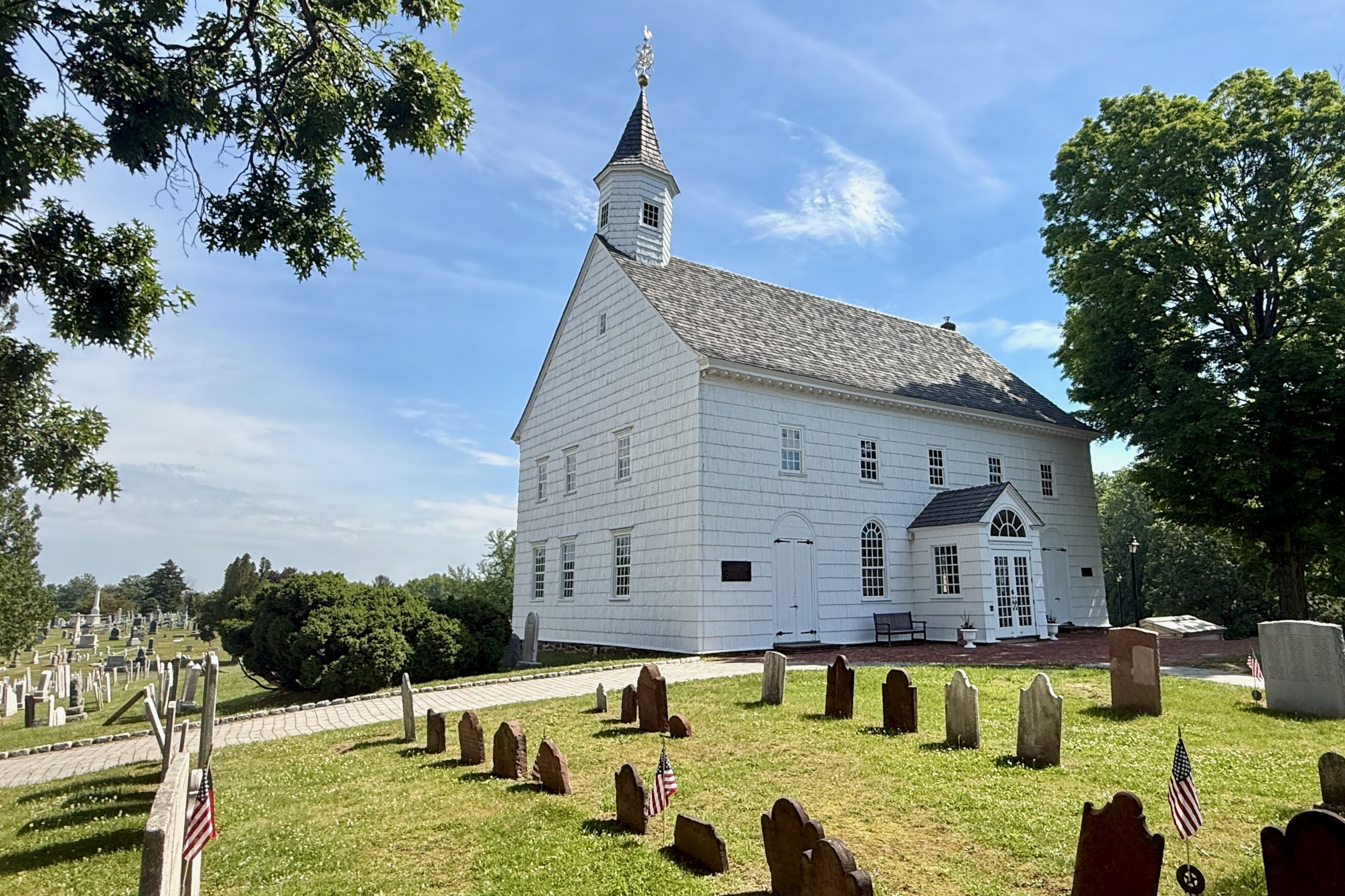
1753 Old Tennent Church

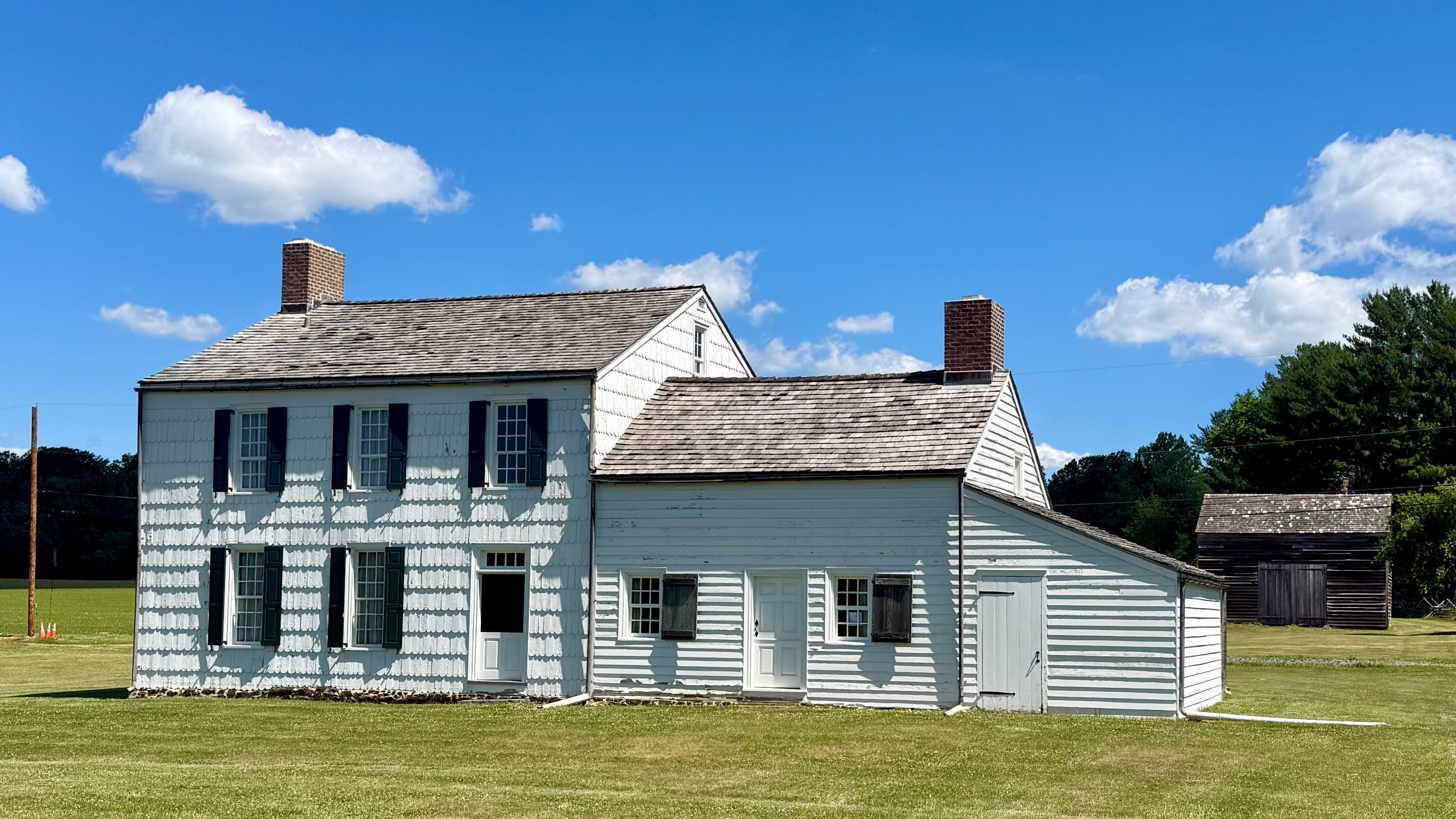
1746 Craig House

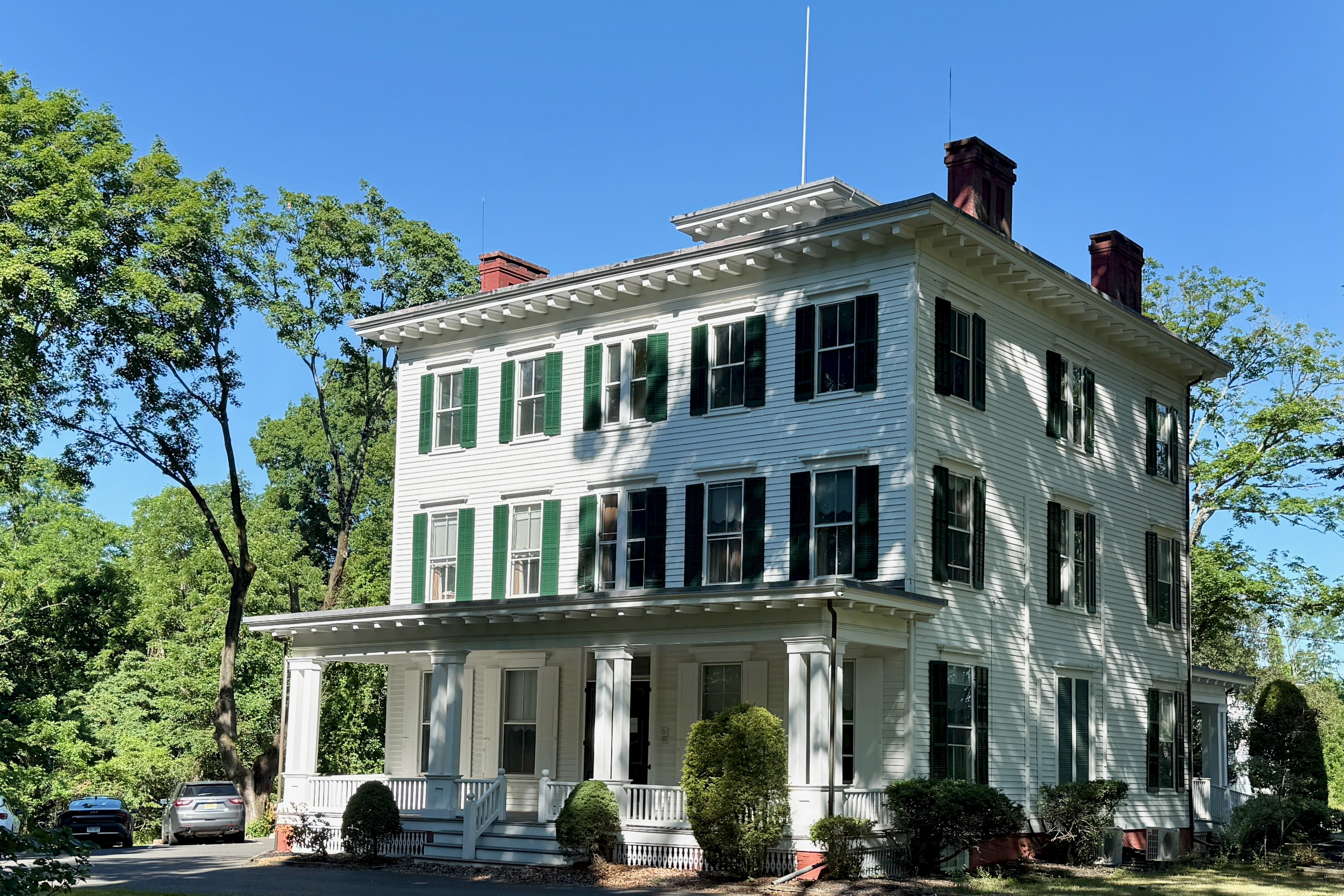
1872 Cobb House

1832 Conover–Perrine House

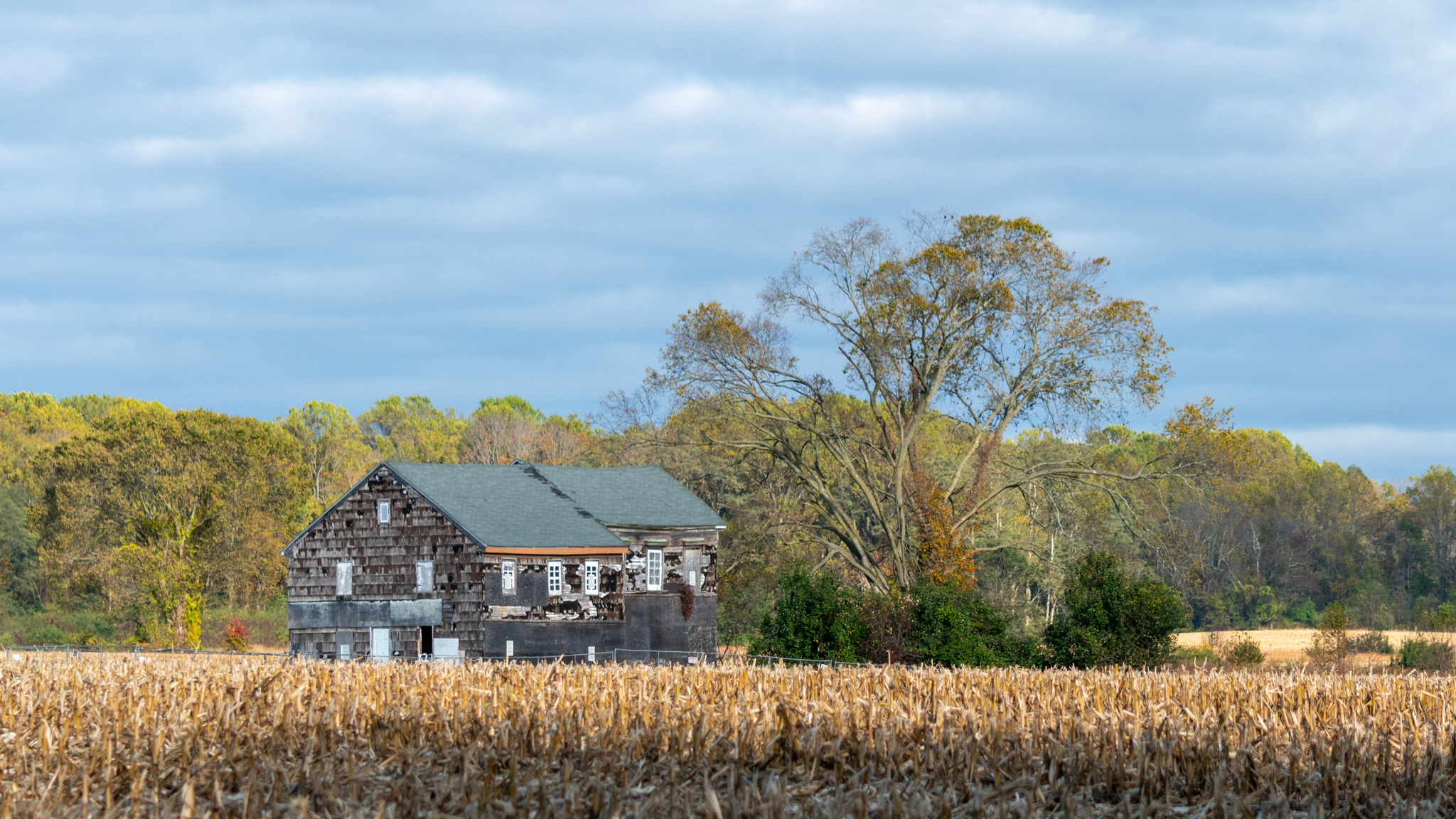
1731 Sutfin House

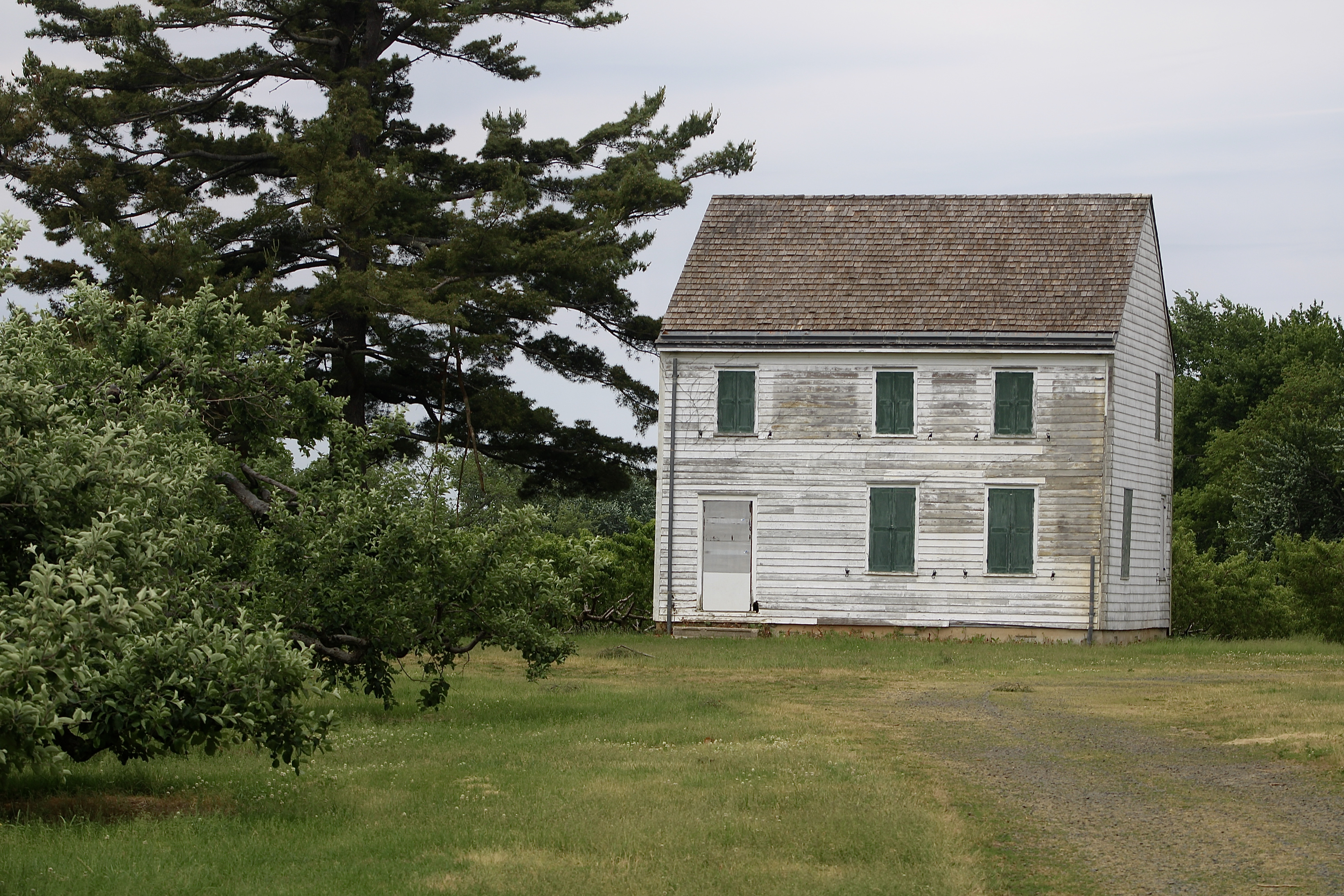
1745 Rhea Applegate House

== Community ==
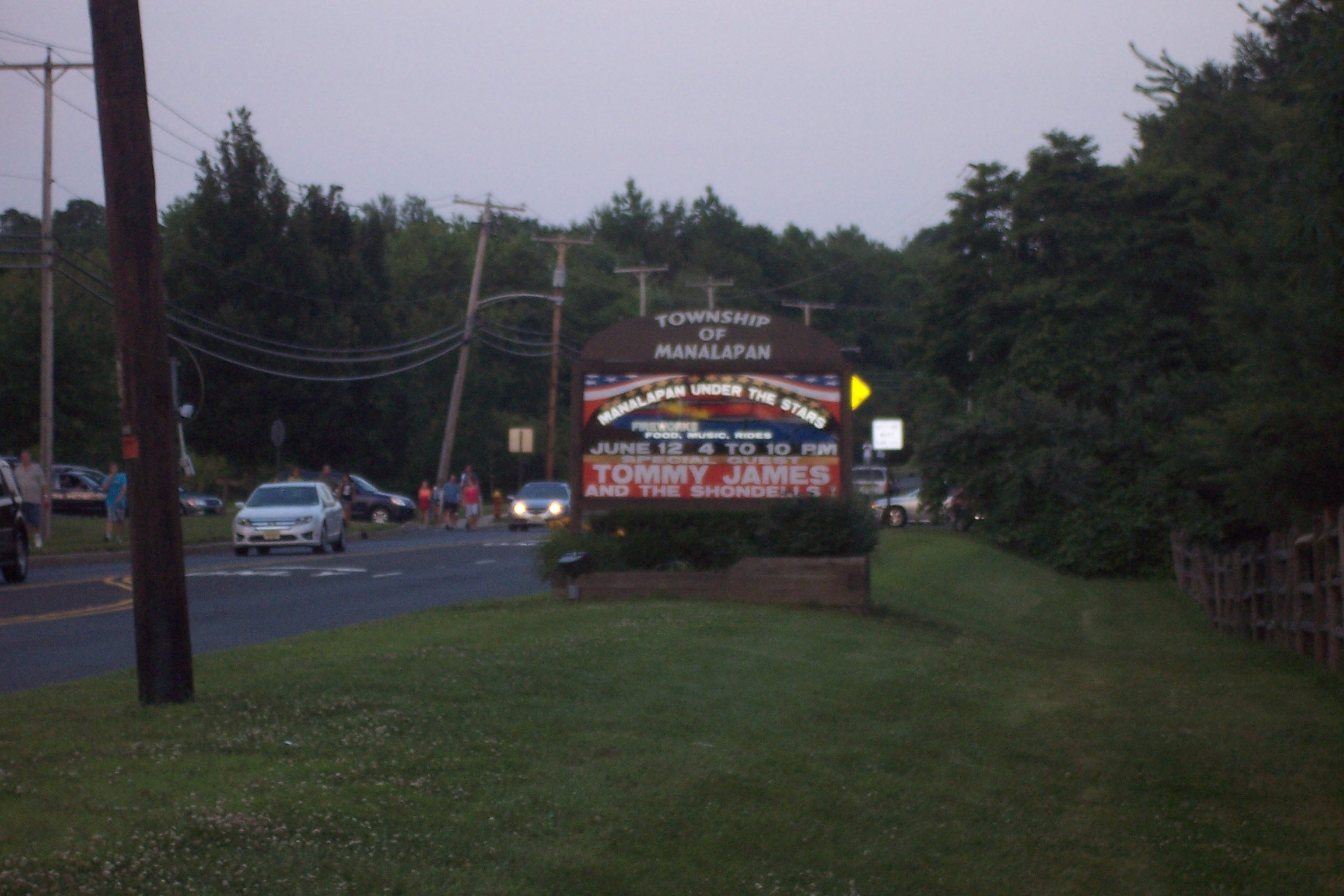
Manalapan Under the Stars in 2010

Manalapan landmarks include the headquarters facility of the Monmouth County Library, the Manalapan Recreation Center, and the battlefield for the Battle of Monmouth. Manalapan Under the Stars, the township's community celebration featuring rides, concerts, fireworks, and other activities, is held annually at the Recreation Center. Performers featured in the series have included Herman's Hermits Starring Peter Noone and Tommy James and the Shondells.

In 2004, Manalapan was rated the second-hottest town on the East Coast by Money magazine.

On May 27, 2001, Manalapan was struck by a tornado rated F2 on the Fujita scale, causing over $1 million in damage. The 200-foot-wide (61 m) tornado had winds of up to 120 miles per hour (190 km/h) over a path of 1.5 miles (2.4 km).

== Infrastructure ==
=== Public safety ===
==== Emergency services ====
The Township of Manalapan has multiple emergency service departments.

===== Police =====
The Manalapan Township Police Department has 55 officers. The force has two major divisions; operations and administration. The Operations Division is headed by Deputy Chief Leonard Maltese, and the Administration Division is headed by Deputy Chief Thomas Mantle. On February 8, 2021, Edward Niesz was promoted as Chief of the Manalapan Township Police Department, succeeding former Chief Michael Fountain; Fountain had served with the department for 27 years, the final four-plus years as Police Chief.

===== Fire Prevention =====
====== Fire squads ======
Manalapan has three volunteer fire companies:

- Manalapan Township Fire Company #1, founded in 1949, is located on Sweetmans Lane and serves the southern portion of the township
- Manalapan Township Fire Company #2: Gordons Corner Fire Company (founded 1962) is located in the heavily suburbanized community of Yorketown in the northern portion of the township. It has two branches that serves the community, one located on Tennent Road, and another on Pease Road
- Englishtown Fire Department is located in neighboring Englishtown and serves central portions the township.

===== First aid squads =====
Englishtown-Manalapan First Aid Squad (EMFAS) is a regional pre-hospital emergency care service for Englishtown and Manalapan residents. The organization was founded in 1941, and is located in Englishtown.

=== Transportation ===
==== Roads and highways ====
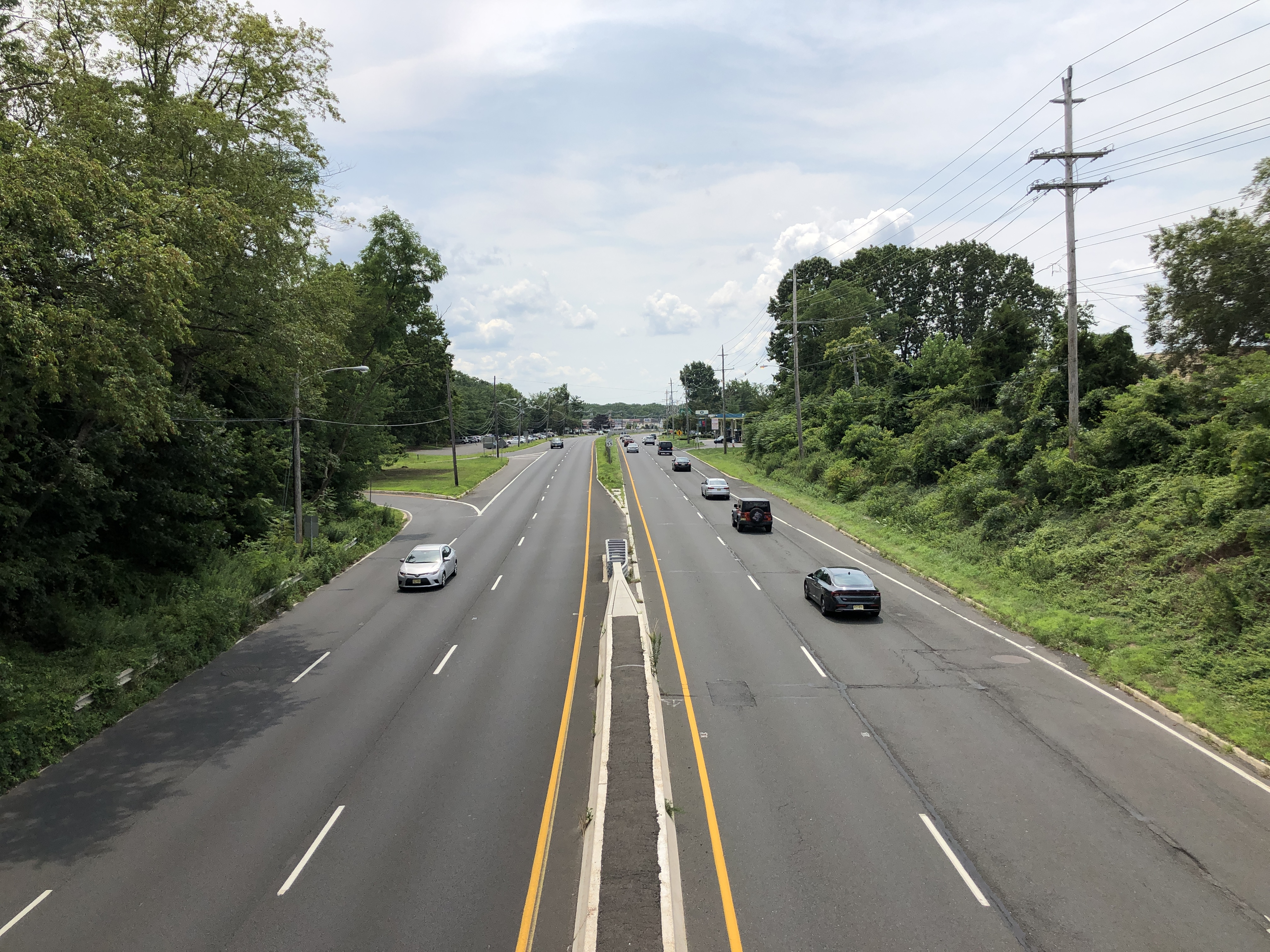
U.S. Route 9 in Manalapan Township

As of May 2010, the township had a total of 192.19 miles (309.30 km) of roadways, of which 164.98 miles (265.51 km) were maintained by the municipality, 19.15 miles (30.82 km) by Monmouth County and 8.06 miles (12.97 km) by the New Jersey Department of Transportation.

Manalapan hosts U.S. Route 9 in the northeast, and Route 33 passes through near the southern part of the township. Major county routes, such as 522 and 527 traverse through the municipality, while 524 and 537 goes along the southeast border of the township.

Other major roads that are accessible outside the township are the Garden State Parkway in bordering Old Bridge Township, Interstate 195 in bordering Millstone Township, and the New Jersey Turnpike (Interstate 95 in New Jersey) in East Windsor (Exit 8) and bordering Monroe Township (Exit 8A).

==== Public transportation ====
===== Rail =====
In the 19th and 20th centuries, Englishtown Borough and Manalapan Township had a major railway in the area, which was the Freehold and Jamesburg Agricultural Railroad. This railway was owned and operated by the Camden & Amboy Railroad Company (C&A), in which surveying for the line began on September 8, 1851, grading began on October 19, 1852, and the first track was laid on April 4, 1853. The first section of line was opened on July 18, 1853. The establishment of the Freehold & Jamesburg Agricultural Railroad allowed this region to become a transportation hub. The Freehold and Jamesburg Railroad was abandoned by the early 1930s. A 2.8-mile-long (4.5 km) portion of the former railroad's right-of-way was later approved to be sold by the New Jersey Board of Public Utility Commissioners (PUC) to Jersey Central Power & Light Company in 1966, with occasional freight service still being utilized through the Freehold Industrial Track.

The Monmouth Ocean Middlesex Line is a proposal by NJ Transit to restore passenger railway service to the region. The township would be a potential stop for the 'MOM' Line.

As of now, the nearest train stations to the township are Metropark in Iselin, Metuchen, New Brunswick, and Princeton Junction on the Northeast Corridor Line.

===== Busing =====
NJ Transit currently provides bus service on the 139 route to the Port Authority Bus Terminal in New York City and to Newark and Jersey City on the 64 and 67 routes.

===== Aviation =====
Following the closure of the Marlboro Airport, Old Bridge Airport supplies short-distance flights to surrounding areas and is the closest air transportation services. The nearest major commercial airports are Trenton-Mercer Airport, which serves several domestic destinations via Frontier Airlines and located 21 miles (34 km) west (about 35 minutes drive); and Newark Airport, which serves as a major hub for United Airlines and located 32 miles (51 km) north (about 48 minutes drive) from the center of Manalapan Township.

=== Healthcare ===
Manalapan Township is served by CentraState Medical Center, which is affiliated with Rutgers Robert Wood Johnson Medical School, located in neighboring Freehold Township. The regional hospital is a 287-bed medical facility. CentraState Healthcare system also provides healthcare through its various family practices in communities across western Monmouth and southern Middlesex counties in Central New Jersey. Two family practices that are accessible to Manalapan include, one in Marlboro and one in Monroe Township.

The next closest hospitals to the township are Hackensack Meridian Hospital at Old Bridge, formerly Raritan Bay Medical Center at Old Bridge, in nearby Old Bridge Township, Penn Medicine Princeton Medical Center in nearby Plainsboro Township, and Saint Peter's University Hospital and Robert Wood Johnson University Hospital in nearby New Brunswick.

== Notable people ==
People who were born in, residents of, or otherwise closely associated with Manalapan Township include:

- Robby Andrews (born 1991), 2016 American Olympic 1500m runner and NCAA mid-distance running champion
- Jim Babjak (born 1957), guitarist for the Smithereens
- Danny Basavich (born 1978), professional pool player
- Jason Bergmann (born 1981), pitcher for the Washington Nationals
- Saeed Blacknall (born 1996), wide receiver who played in the NFL
- Kevin Boyle (born 1992), former professional ice hockey goaltender who played in the NHL for the Anaheim Ducks
- Rachel Breton (born 1990), soccer striker and defender who played for Sky Blue FC and New Jersey Wildcats
- Lou Brutus (born 1962), radio host, musician and photographer
- Alyssa Campanella (born 1990), Miss New Jersey Teen USA 2007, Miss California USA 2011, and Miss USA 2011
- Frank Conover (born 1968), football player for the NFL's Cleveland Browns in 1991 who was drafted out of Syracuse University
- Frank Coppa (born 1941), gangster in the Bonanno crime family
- David DeJesus (born 1979), former right fielder for the Tampa Bay Rays
- Louie DeVito, DJ and producer
- Michael DeVito (born 1961), competitive eater and three-time winner of the Nathan's Hot Dog Eating Contest
- Vic DiBitetto (born 1961), comedian and actor
- Dylan Dreyer (born 1981), meteorologist on Weekend Today
- Val Emmich (born 1979), singer, songwriter and actor
- Lou Esposito (born 1977), American football coach and former player who is defensive line coach for the Baltimore Ravens
- Anthony Firkser (born 1995), tight end for the New England Patriots
- Jay Glazer (born 1969), sportswriter and National Football League insider for Fox Sports
- Walter David Greason, historian whose research addresses suburbanization, racial segregation and economic history
- Ishmael Hyman (born 1995), American football wide receiver for the Tampa Bay Buccaneers of the NFL
- Nick Mara (born 1997), singer, dancer
- Kyle Mullen (died 2022, class of 2015) former captain of the Yale Bulldogs football team who enlisted in the United States Navy after college and died following the "Hell Week" portion of Navy SEAL training
- Audrey Nuna (born 1999), singer and rapper
- Jack Perri (born 1975), head men's basketball coach at Southern New Hampshire University
- Johnny Petraglia (born 1947), former professional ten-pin bowler who won 14 PBA titles and the PBA Triple Crown
- Daniel Rosenthal (born 1991), politician who has since 2017 represented the 27th District in the New York State Assembly and was the Assembly's youngest member when he took office
- Heather J. Sharkey (born 1967), historian of the modern Middle East and Africa
- Dan Smith (born 1989), professional poker player whose poker tournament championships include a World Poker Tour title
- Mike "The Situation" Sorrentino (born 1981), cast member of MTV's Jersey Shore
- Amanda Visco (born 1997), former professional soccer player who played as a defender for Gotham FC
- Carl R. Woodward (1890–1974), educator and college administrator who served from 1951 to 1958 as the fifth president of the University of Rhode Island
- Jade Yorker, film and television actor
