= Englishtown, New Jersey =

Borough in Monmouth County, New Jersey, US

- Borough
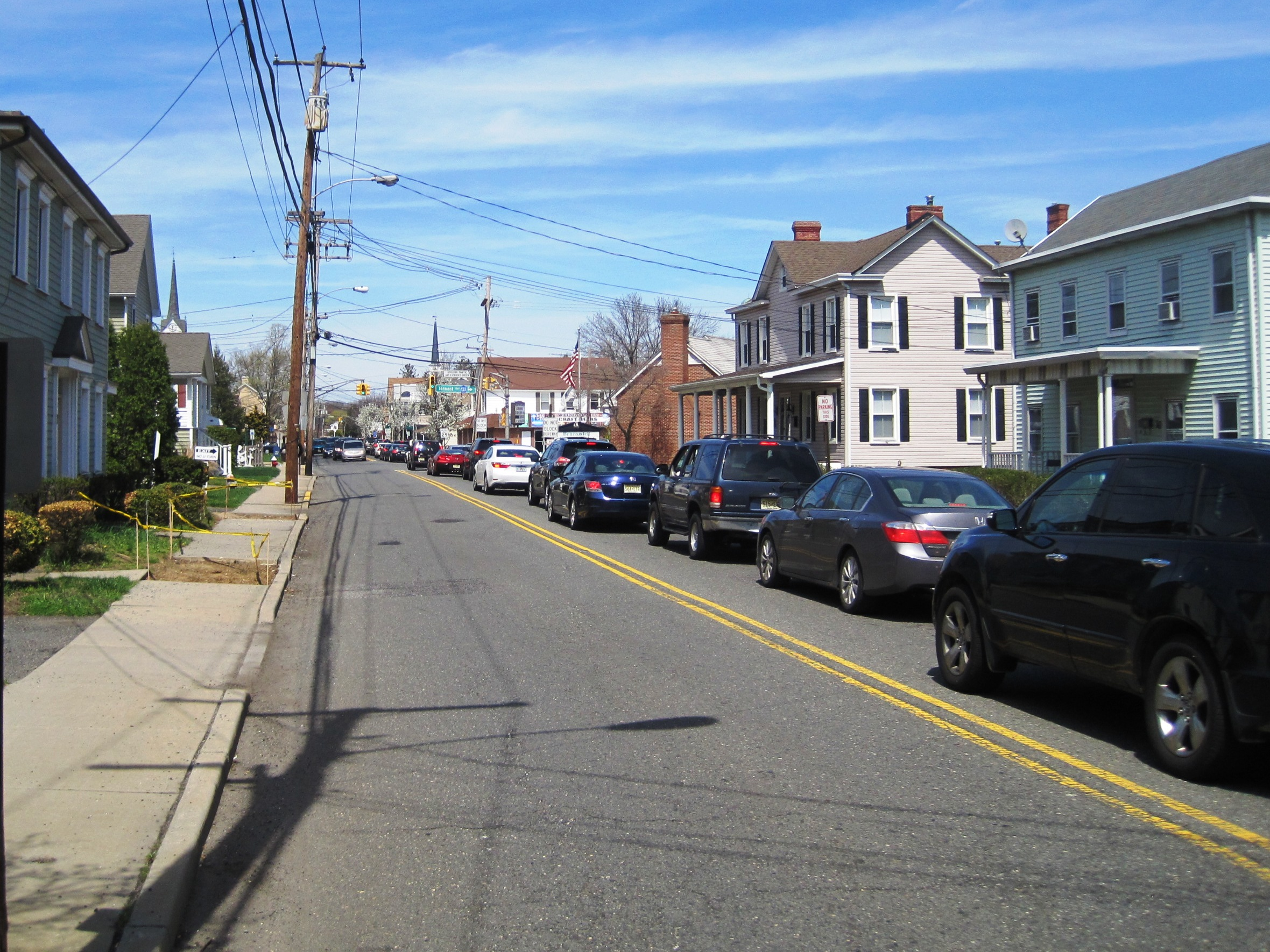
- Looking north along Main Street (CR 527) away from Tennent Avenue (CR 522)

- Seal
- Motto: History, Harmony, and Hospitality
- Location of Englishtown in Monmouth County highlighted in red (left). Inset map: Location of Monmouth County in New Jersey highlighted in orange (right).

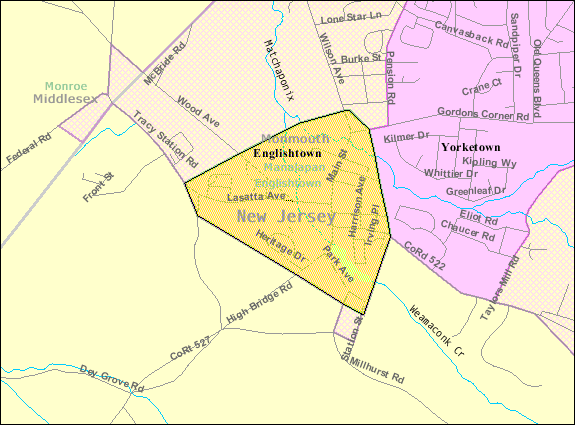
- Census Bureau map of Englishtown, New Jersey

- Location in Monmouth County Location in New Jersey Location in the United States
- Coordinates: 40.296141°N 74.359584°W
- Country: United States
- State: New Jersey
- County: Monmouth
- Incorporated: January 4, 1888
- Named after: James English

Government
  - Type: Borough
  - Body: Borough Council
  - Mayor: Daniel Francisco (R, term ends December 31, 2027)
  - Administrator: Vacant
  - Municipal clerk: Kerry Killeen

Area
  - Total: 0.59 sq mi (1.52 km^{2})
  - Land: 0.57 sq mi (1.48 km^{2})
  - Water: 0.015 sq mi (0.04 km^{2}) 2.88%
  - Rank: 543rd of 565 in state 46th of 53 in county
- Elevation: 69 ft (21 m)

Population (2020)
  - Total: 2,346
  - Estimate (2023): 2,342
  - Rank: 474th of 565 in state 41st of 53 in county
  - Density: 4,117/sq mi (1,590/km^{2})
  - Rank: 152nd of 565 in state 16th of 53 in county
- Time zone: UTC−05:00 (Eastern (EST))
  - Summer (DST): UTC−04:00 (Eastern (EDT))
- ZIP Code: 07726
- Area code: 732 exchanges: 446, 536, 591, 617, 786, 792, 970
- FIPS code: 3402521570
- GNIS feature ID: 0885211
- Website: englishtownnj.com

Englishtown is a borough in western Monmouth County, in the U.S. state of New Jersey. The community is located within the Raritan Valley region. As of the 2020 United States census, the borough's population was 2,346, its highest decennial count ever and an increase of 499 (+27.0%) from the 2010 census count of 1,847, which in turn reflected an increase of 83 (+4.7%) from the 1,764 counted in the 2000 census.

Englishtown was incorporated as a borough by an act of the New Jersey Legislature on January 4, 1888, from portions of Manalapan Township, based on the results of a referendum held the previous day. The borough was named for James English, an early settler.

== History ==
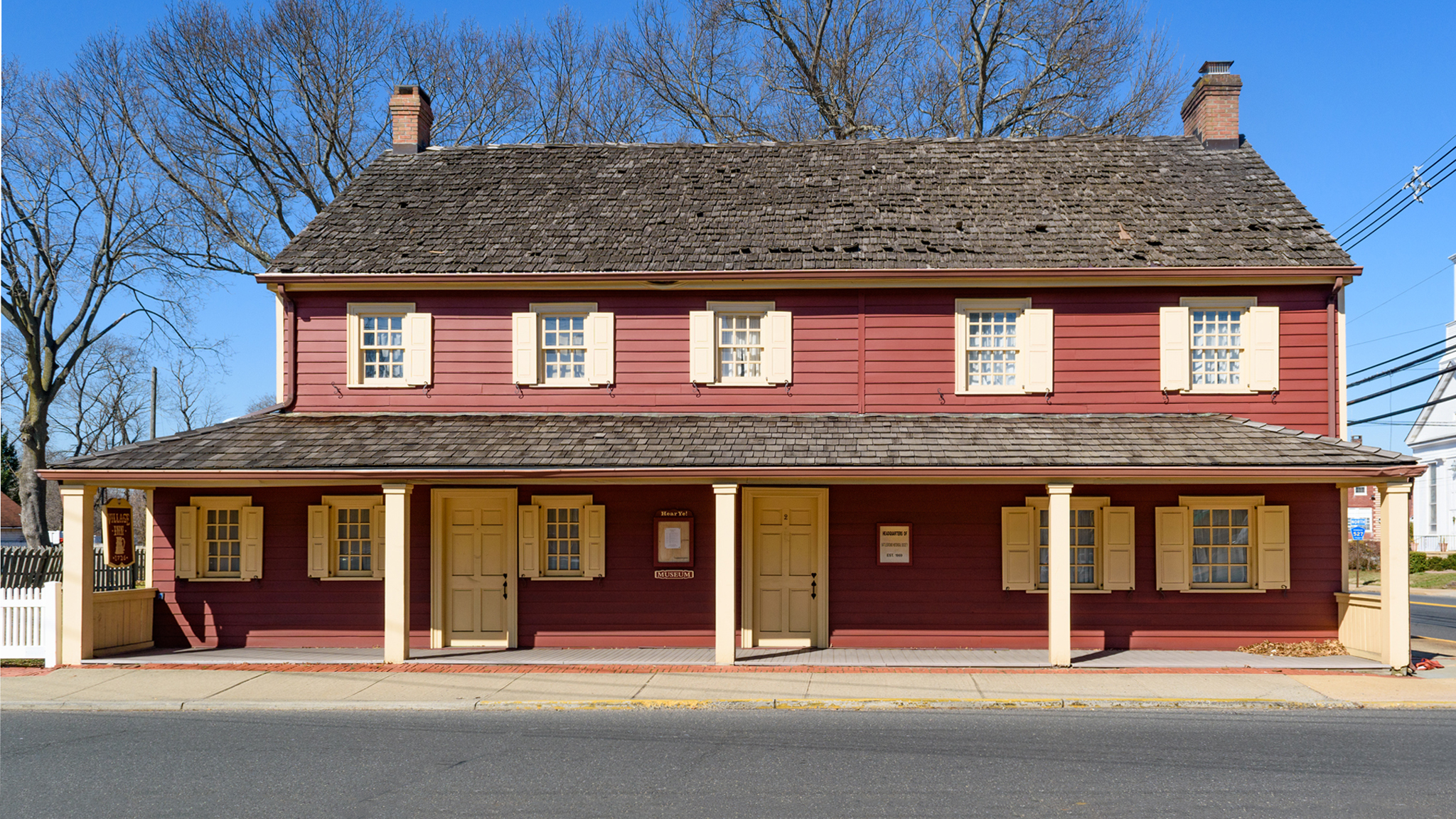
The Village Inn was George Washington's headquarters after the Battle of Monmouth in 1778, as the Court-martial trial of General Charles Lee was taking place (pictured here in March 2020).

At the Battle of Monmouth, an American Revolutionary War battle fought on June 28, 1778, in Monmouth County, American General Charles Lee led the advance and initiated the first attack on the column's rear. When the British turned to flank him, he ordered a general retreat without as much as firing a shot at the enemy, and his soldiers soon became disorganized. General George Washington continued the battle, earning respect for the Continental Army troops under his command. In the dining room of the Village Inn, located in the center of Englishtown, General Washington and Lord Stirling drew up the court martial papers citing Lee for his conduct during and after the battle.

== Geography ==
According to the United States Census Bureau, the borough had a total area of 0.59 square miles (1.52 km^{2}), including 0.57 square miles (1.48 km^{2}) of land and 0.02 square miles (0.04 km^{2}) of water (2.88%).

The borough is entirely surrounded by Manalapan Township, making it part of 21 pairs of "doughnut towns" in the state, where one municipality entirely surrounds another.

== Demographics ==
Historical population
Census	Pop.	Note	%±
1890	444		—
1900	410		−7.7%
1910	468		14.1%
1920	641		37.0%
1930	797		24.3%
1940	815		2.3%
1950	1,004		23.2%
1960	1,143		13.8%
1970	1,048		−8.3%
1980	976		−6.9%
1990	1,268		29.9%
2000	1,764		39.1%
2010	1,847		4.7%
2020	2,346		27.0%
2023 (est.)	2,342	▼	−0.2%
Population sources: 1890–1920 1890–1910; 1910–1930 1940–2000; 2000 2010 2020

=== 2020 census ===
As of the 2020 census, Englishtown had a population of 2,346. The median age was 37.2 years. 22.9% of residents were under the age of 18 and 10.6% of residents were 65 years of age or older. For every 100 females there were 96.3 males, and for every 100 females age 18 and over there were 92.4 males age 18 and over.

100.0% of residents lived in urban areas, while 0.0% lived in rural areas.

There were 789 households in Englishtown, of which 42.6% had children under the age of 18 living in them. Of all households, 53.0% were married-couple households, 17.0% were households with a male householder and no spouse or partner present, and 23.6% were households with a female householder and no spouse or partner present. About 16.6% of all households were made up of individuals and 3.7% had someone living alone who was 65 years of age or older.

There were 820 housing units, of which 3.8% were vacant. The homeowner vacancy rate was 0.4% and the rental vacancy rate was 4.7%.

Racial composition as of the 2020 census
Race	Number	Percent
White	1,740	74.2%
Black or African American	82	3.5%
American Indian and Alaska Native	5	0.2%
Asian	207	8.8%
Native Hawaiian and Other Pacific Islander	0	0.0%
Some other race	124	5.3%
Two or more races	188	8.0%
Hispanic or Latino (of any race)	368	15.7%

=== 2010 census ===
The 2010 United States census counted 1,847 people, 621 households, and 458 families in the borough. The population density was 3,245.7 per square mile (1,253.2/km^{2}). There were 647 housing units at an average density of 1,137.0 per square mile (439.0/km^{2}). The racial makeup was 88.14% (1,628) White, 2.60% (48) Black or African American, 0.00% (0) Native American, 6.82% (126) Asian, 0.11% (2) Pacific Islander, 0.92% (17) from other races, and 1.41% (26) from two or more races. Hispanic or Latino of any race were 8.01% (148) of the population.

Of the 621 households, 40.6% had children under the age of 18; 55.1% were married couples living together; 14.3% had a female householder with no husband present and 26.2% were non-families. Of all households, 20.5% were made up of individuals and 5.3% had someone living alone who was 65 years of age or older. The average household size was 2.84 and the average family size was 3.33.

25.5% of the population were under the age of 18, 8.3% from 18 to 24, 27.2% from 25 to 44, 28.9% from 45 to 64, and 10.1% who were 65 years of age or older. The median age was 38.6 years. For every 100 females, the population had 93.4 males. For every 100 females ages 18 and older there were 90.1 males.

The Census Bureau's 2006–2010 American Community Survey showed that (in 2010 inflation-adjusted dollars) median household income was $70,795 (with a margin of error of +/− $8,336) and the median family income was $86,484 (+/− $8,333). Males had a median income of $65,625 (+/− $10,588) versus $43,333 (+/− $8,417) for females. The per capita income for the borough was $30,313 (+/− $2,456). About 1.5% of families and 2.3% of the population were below the poverty line, including 4.1% of those under age 18 and 5.4% of those age 65 or over.

=== 2000 census ===
As of the 2000 United States census there were 1,764 people, 643 households, and 416 families residing in the borough. The population density was 3,102.1 inhabitants per square mile (1,197.7/km^{2}). There were 680 housing units at an average density of 1,195.8 per square mile (461.7/km^{2}). The racial makeup of the borough was 88.38% White, 4.14% African American, .11% Native American, 4.48% Asian, 1.64% from other races, and 1.25% from two or more races. Hispanic or Latino of any race were 6.24% of the population.

There were 643 households, out of which 39.5% had children under the age of 18 living with them, 51.8% were married couples living together, 10.0% had a female householder with no husband present, and 35.3% were non-families. 28.5% of all households were made up of individuals, and 14.3% had someone living alone who was 65 years of age or older. The average household size was 2.74 and the average family size was 3.51.

In the borough the population was spread out, with 29.1% under the age of 18, 6.0% from 18 to 24, 36.5% from 25 to 44, 17.5% from 45 to 64, and 11% who were 65 years of age or older. The median age was 35 years. For every 100 females, there were 91.5 males. For every 100 females age 18 and over, there were 82.4 males.

The median income for a household in the borough was $57,557, and the median income for a family was $73,750. Males had a median income of $50,694 versus $33,068 for females. The per capita income for the borough was $23,438. About 4% of families and 7.2% of the population were below the poverty line, including 5.7% of those under age 18 and 13.4% of those age 65 or over.

== Government ==
=== Local government ===
Englishtown is governed under the borough form of New Jersey municipal government, which is used in 218 municipalities (of the 564) statewide, making it the most common form of government in New Jersey. The governing body is comprised of the mayor and the borough council, with all positions elected at-large on a partisan basis as part of the November general election. The mayor is elected directly by the voters to a four-year term of office. The borough council includes six members elected to serve three-year terms on a staggered basis, with two seats coming up for election each year in a three-year cycle. The borough form of government used by Englishtown is a "weak mayor / strong council" government in which council members act as the legislative body with the mayor presiding at meetings and voting only in the event of a tie. The mayor can veto ordinances subject to an override by a two-thirds majority vote of the council. The mayor makes committee and liaison assignments for council members, and most appointments are made by the mayor with the advice and consent of the council.

As of 2025, the mayor of the Borough of Englishtown is Republican Daniel Francisco, whose term of office ends December 31, 2027. Members of the Borough Council are John Alite (R, 2028), Sean Atterbury (R, unexpired term), Patsy Fierro (R, 2028), Janet Leonardis (R, 2027), and Louis E. Sarti Jr. (R, 2026).

In January 2024, Alexi Reque was appointed to fill the seat expiring in December 2025 that became vacant following the resignation of Wayne Krawiec earlier that month. Reque served in an interim basis until the November 2024 general election, when he was chosen to serve the balance of the term of office.

In March 2020, Daniel Francisco was chosen to fill the seat expiring in December 2021 that had been held by Lori Cooke until her seat was declared to be vacant after she had missed three consecutive unexcused absences from council meetings.

In April 2016, the borough council selected Eric Mann from three candidates nominated by the Republican municipal committee to fill the seat expiring December 2017 that had been held by Rudy Rucker until his resignation; Mann served on an interim basis until the November 2016 general election, when he was elected to fill the balance of the term.

On March 28, 2012, Jayne Carr's seat on the borough council was officially vacated in accordance with state law after she failed to appear at eight consecutive meetings of the borough council dating back to December 2011. Carr claimed that she had stayed away from council meetings after receiving a death threat, and had informed the Monmouth County Prosecutor regarding the incident. As of May 4, 2012, no official statement has ever been made from any law enforcement agency at the local, state, or federal level confirming Carr's claims. In November 2011, Carr had been censured "for conduct detrimental to the orderly conduct of borough governance and violating standards of decorum and debate of a public body", based on statements that she had made accusing a council member and borough employee of breaking state law, and of having claimed to have chaired meetings of the Englishtown Development Committee. According to official records, the meetings Carr claimed to have chaired were never held.

On April 25, 2012, the council selected Lou Sarti, a retired police officer and long-time resident of Englishtown who had served as president of the Englishtown Fire Department, to fill the unexpired term of the vacated seat.

=== Federal, state, and county representation ===
Englishtown is located in the 3rd Congressional District and is part of New Jersey's 12th state legislative district.

For the 119th United States Congress, New Jersey's 3rd congressional district is currently represented Herb Conaway (D, Delran Township). New Jersey is represented in the United States Senate by Democrats Cory Booker (Newark, term ends 2027) and Andy Kim (Moorestown, term ends 2031).

For the 2026–2027 session, the 12th legislative district of the New Jersey Legislature is represented in the State Senate by Owen Henry (R, Old Bridge Township) and in the General Assembly by Robert D. Clifton (R, Matawan) and Alex Sauickie (R, Jackson Township).

Monmouth County is governed by a Board of County Commissioners composed of five members who are elected at-large to serve three-year terms of office on a staggered basis, with either one or two seats up for election each year as part of the November general election. At an annual reorganization meeting held in the beginning of January, the board selects one of its members to serve as director and another as deputy director.

As of 2025, Monmouth County's Commissioners are Director Thomas A. Arnone (R, Neptune City, 2025), Susan M. Kiley (R, Hazlet Township, 2027), Erik Anderson (R, Shrewsbury, 2026), Nick DiRocco (R, Wall Township, 2025), and Deputy Director Ross F. Licitra (R, Marlboro Township, 2026).

Constitutional officers elected on a countywide basis are Clerk Christine Giordano Hanlon (R, 2025; Ocean Township), Sheriff Shaun Golden (R, 2025; Howell Township) and Surrogate Rosemarie D. Peters (R, 2026; Middletown Township).

=== Politics ===
United States presidential election results for Englishtown
Year	Republican		Democratic		Third party(ies)	
Year	No.	%	No.	%	No.	%
2024	722	65.46%	353	32.00%	28	2.54%
2020	662	57.67%	473	41.20%	13	1.13%
2016	564	63.44%	304	34.20%	21	2.36%
2012	428	54.31%	351	44.54%	9	1.14%
2008	411	52.96%	357	46.01%	8	1.03%
2004	387	56.25%	296	43.02%	5	0.73%
2000	289	46.84%	289	46.84%	39	6.32%
1996	191	41.89%	184	40.35%	81	17.76%
1992	204	41.63%	149	30.41%	137	27.96%

As of March 2011, there were a total of 1,115 registered voters in Englishtown, of which 238 (21.3%) were registered as Democrats, 252 (22.6%) were registered as Republicans and 625 (56.1%) were registered as Unaffiliated. There were no voters registered to other parties.

In the 2012 presidential election, Republican Mitt Romney received 54.3% of the vote (428 cast), ahead of Democrat Barack Obama with 44.5% (351 votes), and other candidates with 1.1% (9 votes), among the 794 ballots cast by the borough's 1,281 registered voters (6 ballots were spoiled), for a turnout of 62.0%. In the 2008 presidential election, Republican John McCain received 52.1% of the vote (411 cast), ahead of Democrat Barack Obama with 45.2% (357 votes) and other candidates with 1.0% (8 votes), among the 789 ballots cast by the borough's 1,118 registered voters, for a turnout of 70.6%. In the 2004 presidential election, Republican George W. Bush received 55.8% of the vote (387 ballots cast), outpolling Democrat John Kerry with 42.7% (296 votes) and other candidates with 0.5% (5 votes), among the 693 ballots cast by the borough's 1,010 registered voters, for a turnout percentage of 68.6.

Gubernatorial election results for Englishtown
Year	Republican		Democratic		Third party(ies)	
Year	No.	%	No.	%	No.	%
2025	445	58.02%	316	41.20%	6	0.78%
2021	440	69.84%	184	29.21%	6	0.95%
2017	250	57.34%	169	38.76%	17	3.90%
2013	320	72.73%	104	23.64%	16	3.64%
2009	358	70.33%	117	22.99%	34	6.68%
2005	250	58.00%	152	35.27%	29	6.73%

In the 2013 gubernatorial election, Republican Chris Christie received 72.7% of the vote (320 cast), ahead of Democrat Barbara Buono with 23.6% (104 votes), and other candidates with 3.6% (16 votes), among the 443 ballots cast by the borough's 1,283 registered voters (3 ballots were spoiled), for a turnout of 34.5%. In the 2009 gubernatorial election, Republican Chris Christie received 70.2% of the vote (358 ballots cast), ahead of Democrat Jon Corzine with 22.9% (117 votes), Independent Chris Daggett with 5.9% (30 votes) and other candidates with 0.8% (4 votes), among the 510 ballots cast by the borough's 1,083 registered voters, yielding a 47.1% turnout.

United States Senate election results for Englishtown1
Year	Republican		Democratic		Third party(ies)	
Year	No.	%	No.	%	No.	%
2024	636	63.41%	336	33.50%	31	3.09%
2018	421	61.55%	237	34.65%	26	3.80%
2012	395	53.74%	319	43.40%	21	2.86%
2006	194	49.87%	171	43.96%	24	6.17%

United States Senate election results for Englishtown2
Year	Republican		Democratic		Third party(ies)	
Year	No.	%	No.	%	No.	%
2020	630	57.27%	447	40.64%	23	2.09%
2014	196	59.76%	126	38.41%	6	1.83%
2013	167	66.80%	78	31.20%	5	2.00%
2008	379	53.76%	301	42.70%	25	3.55%

== Education ==
Public school students in pre-kindergarten through eighth grade attend the Manalapan-Englishtown Regional School District, which also serves children from Manalapan Township. As of the 2023–24 school year, the district, comprised of eight schools, had an enrollment of 4,653 students and 374.1 classroom teachers (on an FTE basis), for a student–teacher ratio of 12.4:1. Schools in the district (with 2023–24 enrollment from the National Center for Education Statistics) are John I. Dawes Early Learning Center with 349 students in grades PreK–K, Clark Mills School with 478 students in grades 1–5, Lafayette Mills School with 427 students in grades 1–5, Milford Brook School with 537 students in grades K–5, Taylor Mills School with 532 students in grades K–5, Wemrock Brook School with 559 students in grades 1–5, Pine Brook School with 596 students in grade 6 and Manalapan-Englishtown Middle School with 1,158 students in grades 7–8. The district is overseen by a nine-member board of education, which sets policy and oversees the fiscal and educational operation of the district. Seats on the nine-member board are allocated based on population, with one seat assigned to Englishtown.

Students from Englishtown in public school for ninth through twelfth grades attend Manalapan High School, as part of the Freehold Regional High School District. The Freehold Regional High School District also serves students from Colts Neck Township, Farmingdale, Freehold Borough, Freehold Township, Howell Township and Marlboro Township. As of the 2023–24 school year, Manalapan High School had an enrollment of 1,740 students and 115.0 classroom teachers (on an FTE basis), for a student–teacher ratio of 15.1:1. Students may apply to attend one of the district's specialized learning centers, including the Science and Engineering Learning Center hosted at Manalapan High School. The FRHSD board of education has nine members, who are elected to three-year terms from each of the constituent districts. Each member is allocated a fraction of a vote that totals to nine points, with Englishtown allocated one member, who has 0.5 votes.

Public high school students also have the option of attending one of the Monmouth County Vocational School District's five career academies.

== Transportation ==
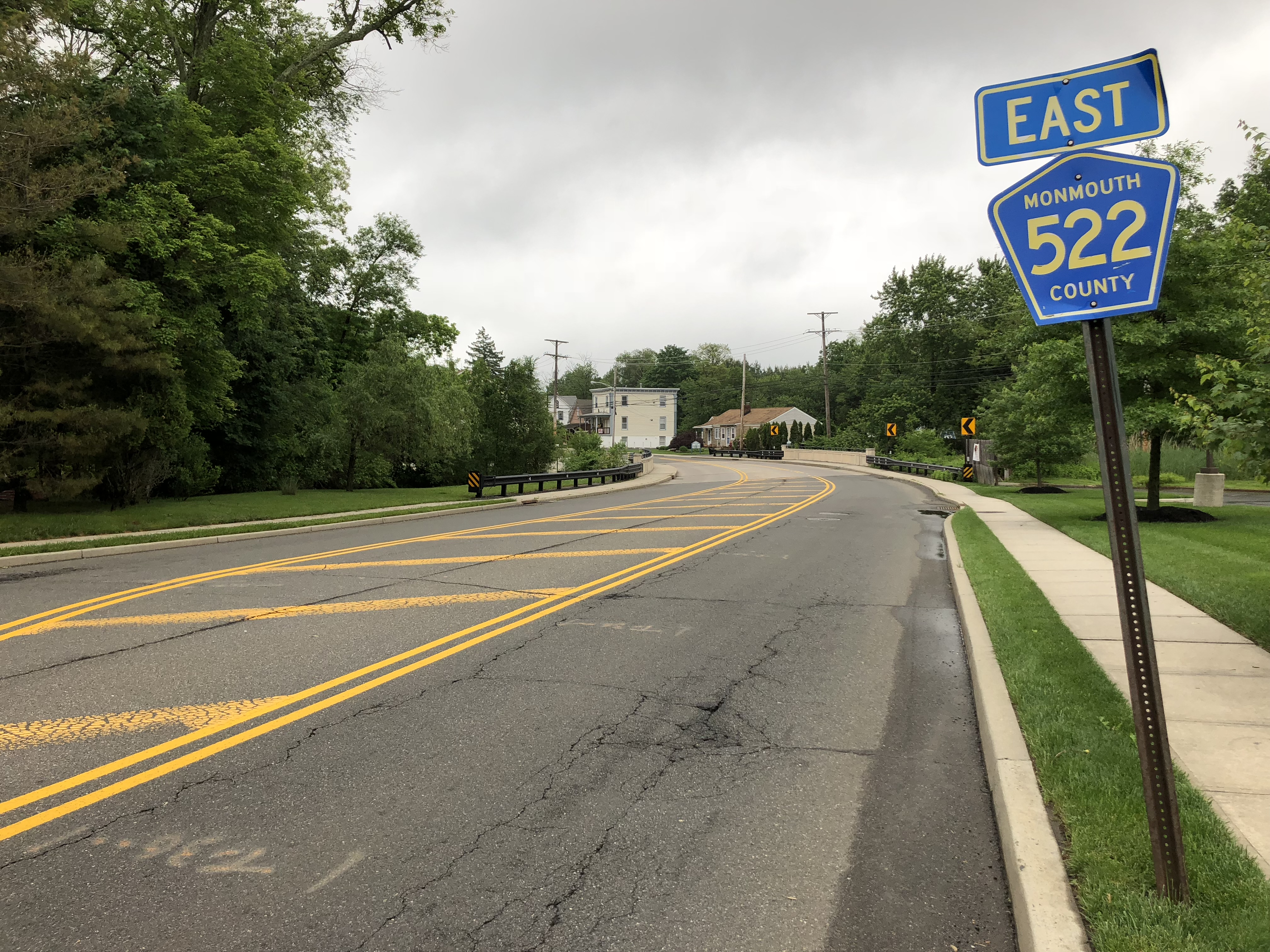
County Route 522 (Wood Avenue) entering Englishtown

=== Roads and highways ===
As of May 2010, the borough had a total of 6.42 miles (10.33 km) of roadways, of which 4.44 miles (7.15 km) were maintained by the municipality and 1.98 miles (3.19 km) by Monmouth County.

County Route 522 (Wood Avenue) and County Route 527 are the most prominent roads directly serving the borough.

=== Public transportation ===
In the 19th and 20th centuries, Englishtown Borough and Manalapan Township had a major railway in the area, which was the Freehold and Jamesburg Agricultural Railroad. This railway was owned and operated by the Camden & Amboy Railroad Company (C&A), in which surveying for the line began on September 8, 1851, grading began on October 19, 1852, and the first track was laid on April 4, 1853. The first section of line was opened on July 18, 1853. The establishment of the Freehold & Jamesburg Agricultural Railroad allowed this region to become a transportation hub. The Freehold and Jamesburg Railroad was abandoned by the early 1930s. A 2.8-mile-long (4.5 km) portion of the former railroad's right-of-way was later approved to be sold by the New Jersey Board of Public Utility Commissioners (PUC) to Jersey Central Power & Light Company in 1966, with occasional freight service still being utilized through the Freehold Industrial Track.

NJ Transit offers bus service between Englishtown and the Port Authority Bus Terminal in Midtown Manhattan, which is available on the 139 route.

Old Bridge Airport and Mar Bar L Farms municipal airport are within 2 1/2 miles (4.0 km) of Englishtown, offering short-distance flights to surrounding areas.

== Points of interest ==
- Old Bridge Township Raceway Park

“Englishtown is home to Freneau Woods Park, a large natural area with hiking trails and woodlands used for recreation and nature programs.”

== Notable people ==
People who were born in, residents of, or otherwise closely associated with Englishtown include:

- Robby Andrews (born 1991), middle-distance runner
- Deborah Berger (1956–2005), artist noted for her oeuvre of brightly colored textile works created in knitting and crochet
- Lou Brutus (born 1962), radio host, musician and photographer
- Dov Davidoff (born 1973), stand-up comedian
- Anthony Firkser (born 1995), professional football tight end for the Kansas City Chiefs of the National Football League
- Ed Krawiec (born 1976), NHRA Pro Stock Motorcycle racer
- Abhimanyu Mishra (born 2009), chess grandmaster and prodigy
- Alan Veingrad (born 1963), former American football offensive lineman who played in the National Football League for the Green Bay Packers and Dallas Cowboys
