= Millhurst, New Jersey =

Populated place in Monmouth County, New Jersey, US

- Unincorporated community
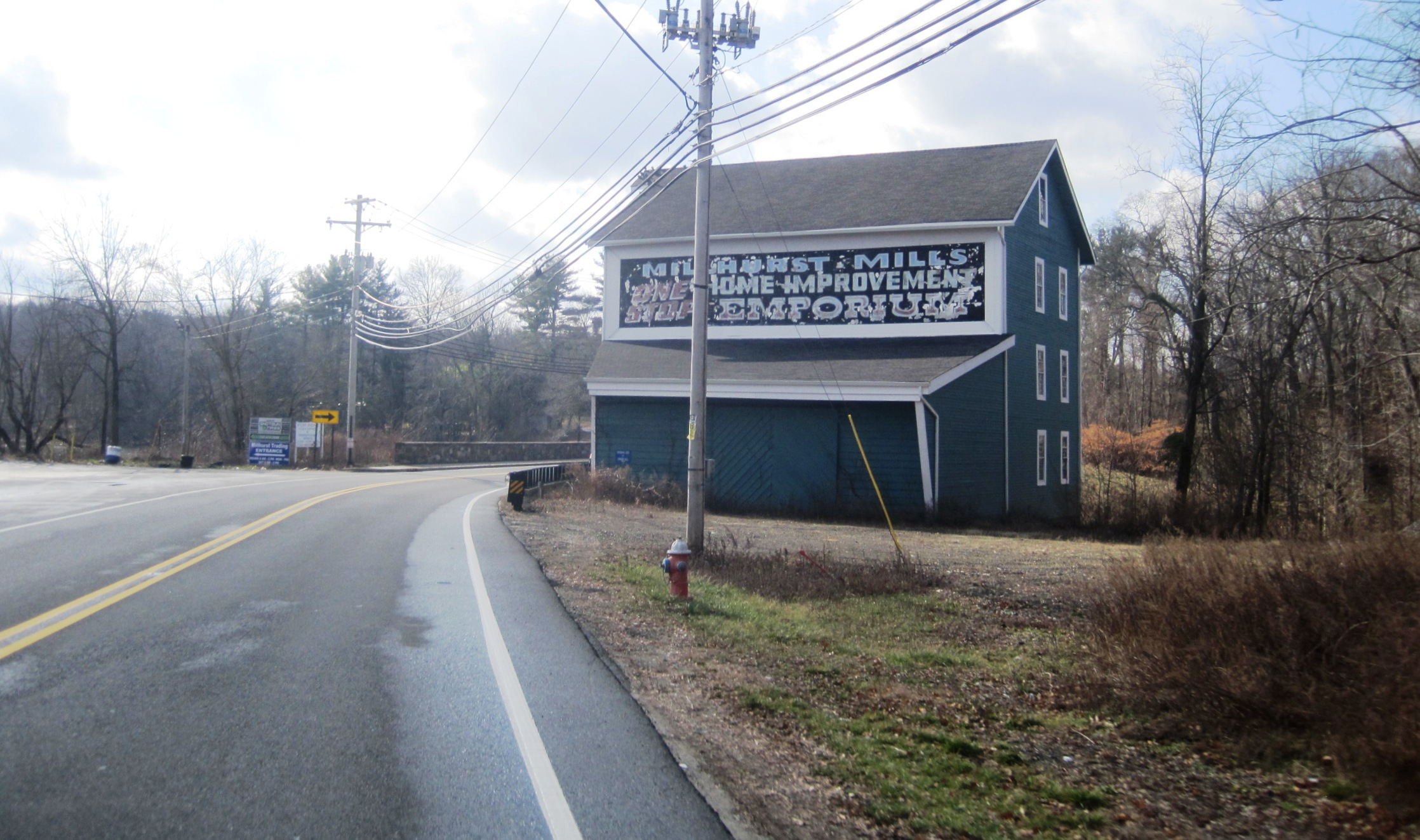
- Former Millhurst Mill

- Location in Monmouth County. Inset: Location of county within the state of New Jersey Millhurst (New Jersey) Millhurst (the United States)
- Coordinates: 40°15′13″N 74°20′30″W
- Country: United States
- State: New Jersey
- County: Monmouth
- Township: Manalapan
- Elevation: 144 ft (44 m)
- Time zone: UTC−05:00 (Eastern (EST))
  - Summer (DST): UTC−04:00 (EDT)
- Area codes: 732/848
- GNIS feature ID: 878379

Millhurst is an unincorporated community located within Manalapan Township in Monmouth County, in the U.S. state of New Jersey. Route 33 and County Route 527 (Sweetmans Lane) pass through the center of Millhurst. Much of the area consists of businesses along the aforementioned arterial roads with the Millhurst Mill at the CR 527 crossing of Manalapan Brook. The mill is a former grist mill built in the 1700s, rebuilt in the 1800s as a more efficient mill, and turned into a family business by Bernard Hochberg in 1925.
