= Cooperman Barnabas Medical Center =

Coordinates: 40.7636°N 74.3049°W

- RWJBarnabas Health
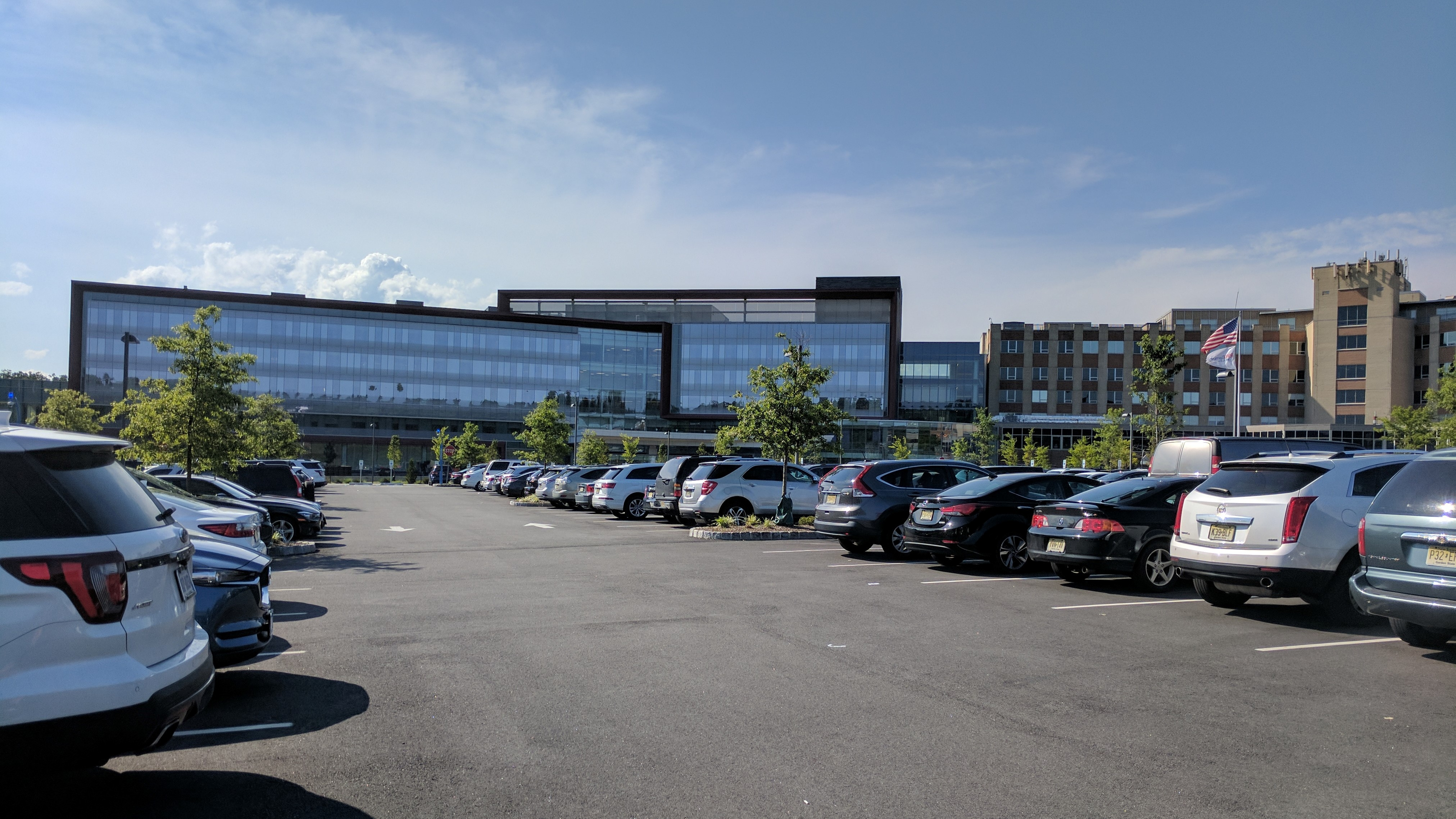

Geography
- Location: 94 Old Short Hills Road, Livingston, New Jersey, United States

Organization
- Type: Major teaching
- Affiliated university: Rutgers Health

Services
- Standards: JCAHO
- Beds: 597

History
- Former name: Saint Barnabas Medical Center
- Founded: 1865

Links
- Website: https://www.rwjbh.org/CoopermanBarnabas
- Lists: Hospitals in New Jersey

Cooperman Barnabas Medical Center (CBMC), formerly Saint Barnabas Medical Center (SBMC), is a 597-bed non-profit major teaching hospital located in Livingston, New Jersey. An affiliate of RWJBarnabas Health (formerly known as Barnabas Health and Saint Barnabas Health Care System), it is the oldest and largest nonprofit, nonsectarian hospital in New Jersey.

== History ==
In 1865, a group of women known as the Ladies Society of Saint Barnabas House established The Hospital of Saint Barnabas in a private home. Eliza Titus who was the first patient gave her small estate to help in creating the first hospital on McWhorter Street in Newark. On February 18, 1867, The Hospital of Saint Barnabas became the first incorporated hospital in New Jersey by the act of New Jersey Legislature. The hospital was later moved to a larger site on High Street in Newark in 1869. The hospital was called Saint Barnabas Hospital and had been expanding services for many decades.

Between 1950 and 1955 there was discussion of relocating the hospital outside of Newark. Finally, the decision was made to move to Livingston. The new site was purchased in 1956 and the hospital was renamed to Saint Barnabas Medical Center in the same year. The new hospital at the current location was opened on November 29, 1964. Since that day, Saint Barnabas Medical Center has been expanding with opening of new departments and units. In 1982, the Board of Trustees voted to form a multi-corporation healthcare system with the Saint Barnabas Corporation as the parent company which was the beginning of Saint Barnabas Health Care System.

Both Saint Barnabas Medical Center and Saint Barnabas Health Care System continued to grow. In 1996, the Federal Trade Commission approved Saint Barnabas Health Care System to form a statewide health system. The system included eight acute care hospitals: Saint Barnabas Medical Center; Community Medical Center in Toms River; Irvington General Hospital; Kimball Medical Center in Lakewood; Monmouth Medical Center in Long Branch; Newark Beth Israel Medical Center; Union Hospital; and Wayne General Hospital. The system later expanded to include Clara Maass Medical Center in Belleville, West Hudson Hospital in Kearny and Wayne General Hospital. However, Wayne General Hospital subsequently changed to affiliate with another organization (Saint Joseph's Healthcare System), Irvington General Hospital was later owned by City of Irvington, and Union Hospital was closed in 2007. In 2011, the Saint Barnabas Health Care System was renamed to Barnabas Health.

In 2015, Barnabas Health and Robert Wood Johnson Health System signed an agreement which outlines the merger between these two health systems. Once complete, the transaction will create New Jersey’s largest health care system and one of the largest in the nation. On March 30, 2016, the two health systems officially merged and formed RWJBarnabas Health.

In September 2021, Saint Barnabas Medical Center received a gift of $100 million from the Cooperman Family Foundation. The hospital was renamed Cooperman Barnabas Medical Center in honor of the family’s gift. The donation was the largest ever given to any hospital in New Jersey.

Cooperman Barnabas Medical Center currently treats nearly 33,000 inpatients and over 95,000 adult and pediatric Emergency Department patients each year. Together, the Medical Center and Ambulatory Care Center provide treatment and services to more than 349,000 outpatients annually.

== Departments and Centers ==
Cooperman Barnabas Medical Center is accredited by the Joint Commission and the American Medical Association Accreditation Council for Graduate Medical Education. The Joint Commission has provided disease-specific care certifications to CBMC for the following programs: Acute Coronary Syndrome, Heart Failure, Stroke, Hip and Knee Replacement and Palliative Care. In addition, CBMC’s Epilepsy program is designated a level four specialty center by the National Association of Epilepsy Centers.

=== Obstetrics and gynecology ===
The department of obstetrics and gynecology delivers about 6,000 babies annually. The department is designed as a regional perinatal center for high risk pregnancies. The 56-bed Neonatal Intensive Care Unit has eight full-time neonatologists during the day, at least two newborn specialists at night, and more than 100 NICU nurses.

The department also formed the nation's first hospital-affiliated program with a private cord blood bank, LifebankUSA, to encourages patients to bank or donate the material for research.

=== Renal and Pancreas Transplant Division ===
The Renal and Pancreas Transplant Division at Cooperman Barnabas Medical Center is one of the most active transplant programs in the United States.

The division performed the first paired kidney exchange in New Jersey at Cooperman Barnabas Medical Center in 2005. Over time, it has performed many kidney transplants and exchanges including complex multihospital kidney exchanges. In 2018, the center's kidney exchange program completed the 23-link transplant chain, becoming the longest single-hospital kidney transplant chain in the United States.

The division also provides education programs such as the first live kidney transplant operation broadcast to a public audience in the UK at Dana Centre in 2007.

=== Burn Center ===
The Burn Center at Cooperman Barnabas was established in 1977. It is the only certified burn treatment center in New Jersey and the only center in New Jersey that meets the verification criteria of the American Burn Association. The center is equipped to treat pediatric through geriatric burn patients with 12-bed intensive care unit, 18-bed burn step-down unit, and two hydrotherapy suites. Outpatient department provides specialized burn care for patients who do not require hospitalization. The center treats 400 patients annually.

The center also provides education and outreach programs through sponsorship from Saint Barnabas Burn Foundation which was established in 1987. Free clinical education programs are prehospital care, emergency department & hospital programs, and nursing school program. Community outreach programs include classroom programs designed to enhance science and health curriculum, juvenile firesetter intervention program, and a mobile trailer that recreates a home environment to educate children about fire safety.

The Burn Center and its staff were discussed in the book titled After the Fire: A True Story of Friendship and Survival by Robin Gaby Fisher – a Pulitzer Prize finalist in a story about the survival of the two most burned victims in the Seton Hall fire in 2000.

=== Pathology ===
The pathology department has among the oldest continuously accredited CAP laboratories in the US, having been accredited since 1964. Over 6 million clinical tests, 23000 surgical specimens, and 7000 cytology specimens are processed annually. The department also has an accredited ACGME residency program in pathology and is a member of the Clinical and Laboratory Standards Institute.

In 2015, Quest took over operations of the laboratory. In August 2022, RWJBarnabas divested its laboratories to LabCorp.

== Residency ==
Cooperman Barnabas Medical Center offers residency in Anesthesiology, Internal Medicine, General Surgery, Neurosurgery, Obstetrics and Gynecology, Radiology, Pathology, Podiatry, and Otolaryngology/Facial Plastic Surgery with more than 150 positions. The Medical Center is affiliated with New Jersey Medical School in Newark, New Jersey; New York College of Osteopathic Medicine and St. George’s University in St. George's, Grenada.

== Ranking ==
Cooperman Barnabas Medical Center was ranked among Best Regional Hospital from U.S. News & World Report in 2021–2022. It also received high scores for its specialties from U.S. News & World Report: chronic obstructive pulmonary disease, colon cancer, congestive heart failure, diabetes and endocrinology, gastroenterology, heart attack, kidney failure, pneumonia, stroke, and urology. Cooperman Barnabas Medical Center was also recognized as a Magnet hospital from the American Nurses Credentialing Center for nursing excellence in 2018.

== Notable achievements ==
- In 1997, the world's first baby was born as a result of cytoplasmic transfer performed by The Institute for Reproductive Medicine and Science of Saint Barnabas Medical Center.
- In June 2004, Saint Barnabas Medical Center delivered a 23-week-old twin boy with weight of 320 grams. The boy was hospitalized in the Neonatal Intensive Care Unit for five months. He was one of the smallest premature births in New Jersey to survive. He also holds the record as one of the world's smallest boys known to survive.
- In January 2009, Dr. Stuart Geffner performed the world's first all-robotic kidney transplant at Saint Barnabas Medical Center. The same team performed eight more fully robotic kidney transplants in the six-month period after the first.
- In March 2009, Saint Barnabas Medical Center, Newark Beth Israel Medical Center and New York-Presbyterian Hospital performed the world's second multihospital six-way kidney transplant chain. The first was performed by Johns Hopkins Hospital, Barnes-Jewish Hospital and Integris Baptist Medical Center in Oklahoma City four weeks earlier.
