= Monmouth Ocean Hospital Service Corporation =

The Monmouth Ocean Hospital Service Corporation
- Type: Private
- Industry: Ambulance service
- Headquarters: Neptune City, New Jersey; Roselle, New Jersey
- Area served: New Jersey
- Key people: Jeffery Behm, President & CEO
- Services: Advanced Life Support; Specialty Critical Care Transport; Special Events Medical Staffing; Air Medical Unit
- Revenue: $61M (2010)
- Website: monoc.org

The Monmouth Ocean Hospital Service Corporation (MONOC) was a non-profit hospital services company which provided emergency and non-emergency medical transport services in New Jersey.

MONOC was formed in 1978 as a cooperative by member hospitals It ceased operations in 2020.

Former MONOC Member Hospitals:

- Saint Barnabas Medical Center
- Clara Maass Medical Center
- Newark Beth Israel Medical Center
- Bayshore Community Hospital
- Riverview Medical Center
- University Medical Center at Princeton
- Monmouth Medical Center
- CentraState Medical Center
- Jersey Shore University Medical Center
- Ocean Medical Center
- Kimball Medical Center
- Saint Mary's Hospital at Passaic
- Community Medical Center
- Southern Ocean County Hospital
- Deborah Heart and Lung Center
- Saint Michael's Medical Center

One of MONOC's programs was the operation of paramedic services through a state-granted geographic exclusivity in Monmouth and Ocean counties, as well as portions of several other counties in northern New Jersey, under a Certificate of Need (CN) issued from the New Jersey Department of Health and Senior Services.

As of April 1, 2020 MONOC ceased all MICU & SCTU operations throughout the state. On this date, RWJ Barnabas Health (SBHCS) and Hackensack Meridian Health assumed these MICU and SCTU services.

== Services & Divisions ==
Mobile Intensive Care Paramedic Service

MONOC's Advanced Life Support Division (ALS) was started in 1985 to provide a higher level of emergency medical service with municipal volunteer first aid squads throughout Monmouth County and Northern Ocean County. This service grew slowly to a system in which seven Mobile Intensive Care Units (MICU) were stationed throughout the two counties to provide rapid response to all life-threatening emergencies. Early on, these units were dispatched by the dispatch centers in the respective counties served. This was ultimately changed to allow the MONOC Dispatch Center to perform the service.

In 2003, through an agreement with SBHCS, MONOC acquired five additional MICUs, encompassing the remainder of Ocean County. In 2004, through yet another merger with the remaining SBHCS hospitals, MONOC acquired their remaining six MICUs in Northern New Jersey. This increased MONOC's ALS coverage area to Union County, Essex County, and Hudson County. In 2005, Passaic Beth Israel Medical Center became a member of MONOC, adding two additional MICUs and coverage in Passaic County, and Bergen County.

Basic Life Support

MONOC's Basic Life Support Division (BLS) was started in 1995 to provide emergency medical service to the residents of Jackson Township. The division grew over the years to service all of the transportation needs for Southern Ocean County Hospital, Atlantic City Medical Center; City and Mainland Divisions, Bayshore Community Hospital, Centrastate Medical Center, and University Medical Center at Princeton.

In 2003, MONOC entered into contracts with SBHCS' southern hospitals; acquiring EMTAC EMS and the responsibility of all transportation for Kimball Medical Center, Community Medical Center and Monmouth Medical Center. In 2004, MONOC assumed responsibility of SBHCS northern facilities and the remainder of EMTAC, servicing SBHCS, Irvington General Hospital, Union Hospital, and Newark Beth Israel. Ultimately, MONOC began to provide service to both Passaic Beth Israel, and Deborah Heart and Lung Center.

As of mid 2019, the Basic Life Support Division was eliminated from MONOC.

Specialty Care Transport Services

MONOC's Specialty Care Transport Division (SCT) was started in 1995 to provide care to critically ill or injured patients in need of transport from one hospital to another. MONOC provided primary SCT services to Community Medical Center, Saint Barnabas Medical Center and Burn Unit, Clara Maas Medical Center, Newark Beth Israel Medical Center, Bayshore Community Hospital, University Medical Center at Princeton, Monmouth Medical Center, CentraState Medical Center, Kimball Medical Center, Deborah Heart and Lung Center and Southern Ocean County Hospital.

Bariatric Transport Services

The Monmouth-Ocean Hospital Services Corporation (MONOC Emergency Medical Services) developed a “Bariatric Transport Unit” equipped with specially trained personnel and equipment designed to transport patients weighing up to 1,600 pounds.

Tactical EMS

This team was specially trained to provide medical support to tactical law enforcement officials for missions that may be of a high-risk nature.

Communications

The MONOC Communications Center (commonly referred to as "Control") was a dispatch center responsible for answering 9-1-1 calls for contracted municipalities and taking requests for emergency services from six counties.

== Flight Program ==
On April 6, 2006, the Office of Emergency Medical Services (OEMS) of the New Jersey Department of Health and Senior Services issued an Air Medical Unit License to MONOC. This program ended on August 8, 2019.

== Controversies ==
MONOC's billing practices have been controversial and have been investigated by the media and legislators.
