= Children's Specialized Hospital =

Coordinates: 40.494852°N 74.451714°W

- RWJBarnabas Health

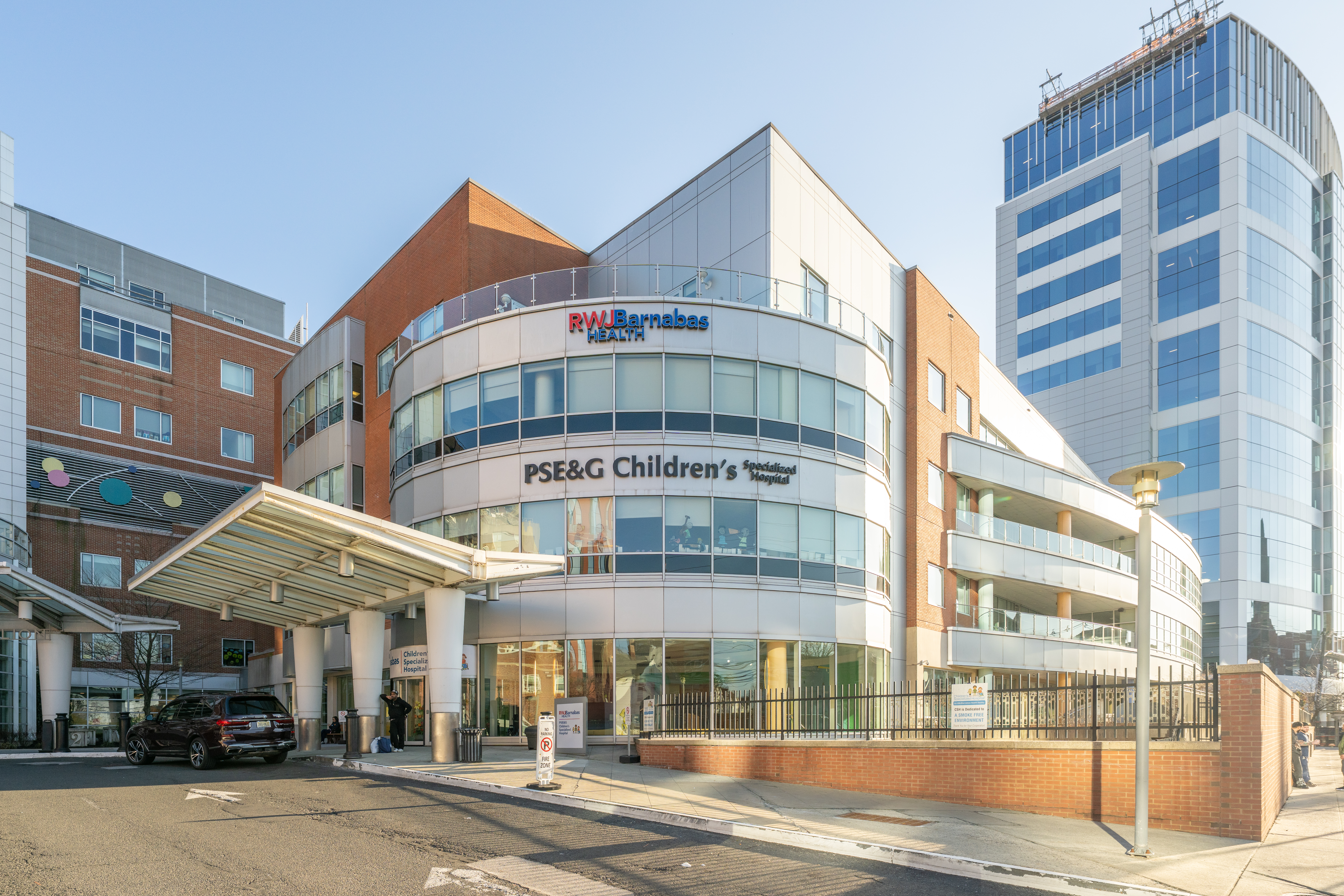
- The main entrance of the New Brunswick campus of Children's Specialized Hospital

Geography
- Location: 200 Somerset St, New Brunswick, NJ, New Jersey, United States

Organization
- Type: Children’s Rehabilitation Hospital
- Affiliated university: Robert Wood Johnson Medical School at Rutgers University
- Network: RWJ Barnabas Health

Services
- Emergency department: None, next door at The Bristol-Myers Squibb Children's Hospital
- Beds: 140

History
- Founded: 1891

Links
- Website: Website
- Lists: Hospitals in New Jersey

Children's Specialized Hospital (CSH) is a children's rehabilitation hospital in New Brunswick, New Jersey. It has 140 beds. Founded in 1891, the hospital supports a wide range of research with five core areas of research focus - autism, mobility, cognition, brain injury, and chronic illness. It treats infants, children, teens, and young adults up until the age of 21. Its largest campus is in New Brunswick campus which is a member of the greater Children's Academic Health Campus.

== History ==
=== Early history ===
The hospital was founded in the summer of 1891 in Westfield, New Jersey. On June 30, 1891, local residents held a meeting discussing how to help local children living in the tenements, and organized into a board of managers with William G. Peckham and Laura Thurston Peckham organizing. Laura Peckham became president. They raised money from local churches, and the hospital opened at Levi Cory House at Mountain Avenue and New Providence Road on July 15, 1892. 59 city children stayed at the home over the summer, with two-week stays each. The home became a hospital as well, when it became apparent many of the children needed medical attention. The hospital filed a certificate of incorporation on April 4, 1893 as Children's Country Home. It later moved to New Providence Road in Mountainside in 1896. In 1962, it became Children's Specialized Hospital. In 1988, it founded its Pediatric Long Term Care Unit for 25 children, and also opened the hospital's Outpatient Center in Fanwood. Children's Specialized Hospital joined the Robert Wood Johnson Health System in 1999.

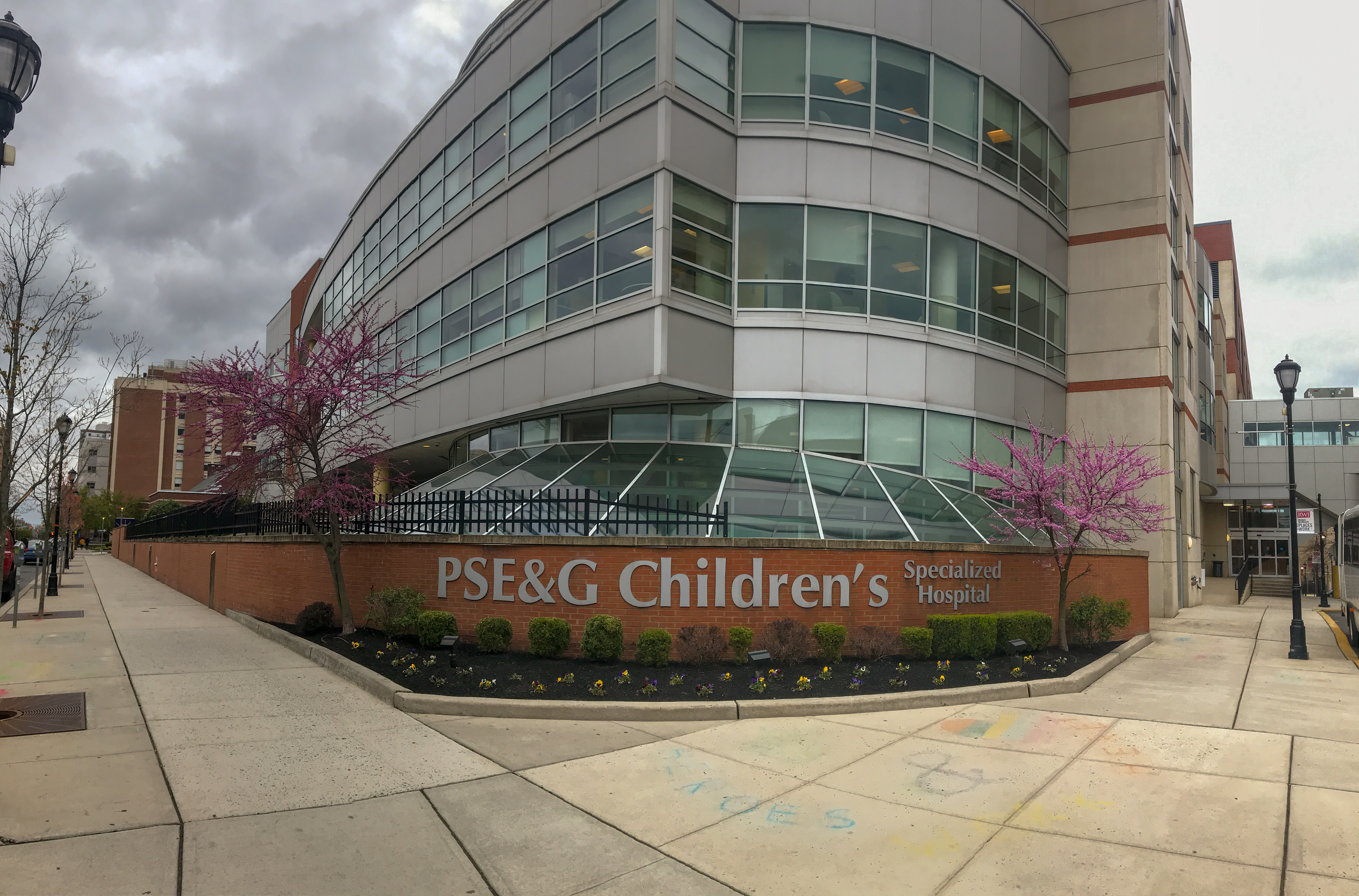
The corner of the New Brunswick Campus.

=== Later history ===
In 2000, the hospital became responsible for the Rosemary Cuccaro Pediatric Medical Day Care Center in Elizabeth.

Around 2010, the hospital developed a program to treat babies with neonatal abstinence syndrome (NAS), with about 12 to 15 babies treated a year. By 2015, other programs included treating "complex physical disabilities like brain and spinal cord injuries, to developmental and behavioral issues like autism and mental health."

In 2011, the hospital had a number of entertainers visit patients and staff. They included the Midtown Men, which were from the original cast of Jersey Boys.

In 2012, the hospital released research showing that six underserved communities in New Jersey cities had higher rates of autism. The test involved the screening of 1,000 children from Newark, Plainfield, Elizabeth, Trenton, New Brunswick and Bridgeton, and was funded by the New Jersey Governor's Council for Medical Research and Treatment of Autism.

In 2014, L’Oreal raised $625,000 for the Children's Specialized Hospital Foundation, with the funds to be support the expansion of the PSE&G Children's Specialized Hospital. It allowed eight beds to be added to the 60-bed inpatient hospital in New Brunswick.

Around 2011, the hospital began focusing a lot on research into rehabilitation in five big areas: autism, mobility, cognition, brain injury, and chronic illness. By 2016, the hospital was doing research with the Kessler Foundation (of the Kessler Institute for Rehabilitation) in conjunction with the New Jersey Department of Education to study in-patient stay outcomes at school after discharge from the hospital. It also had around 60 different research projects going, studying topics such as autism and eksoskeletons to help with walking.

== Current locations ==
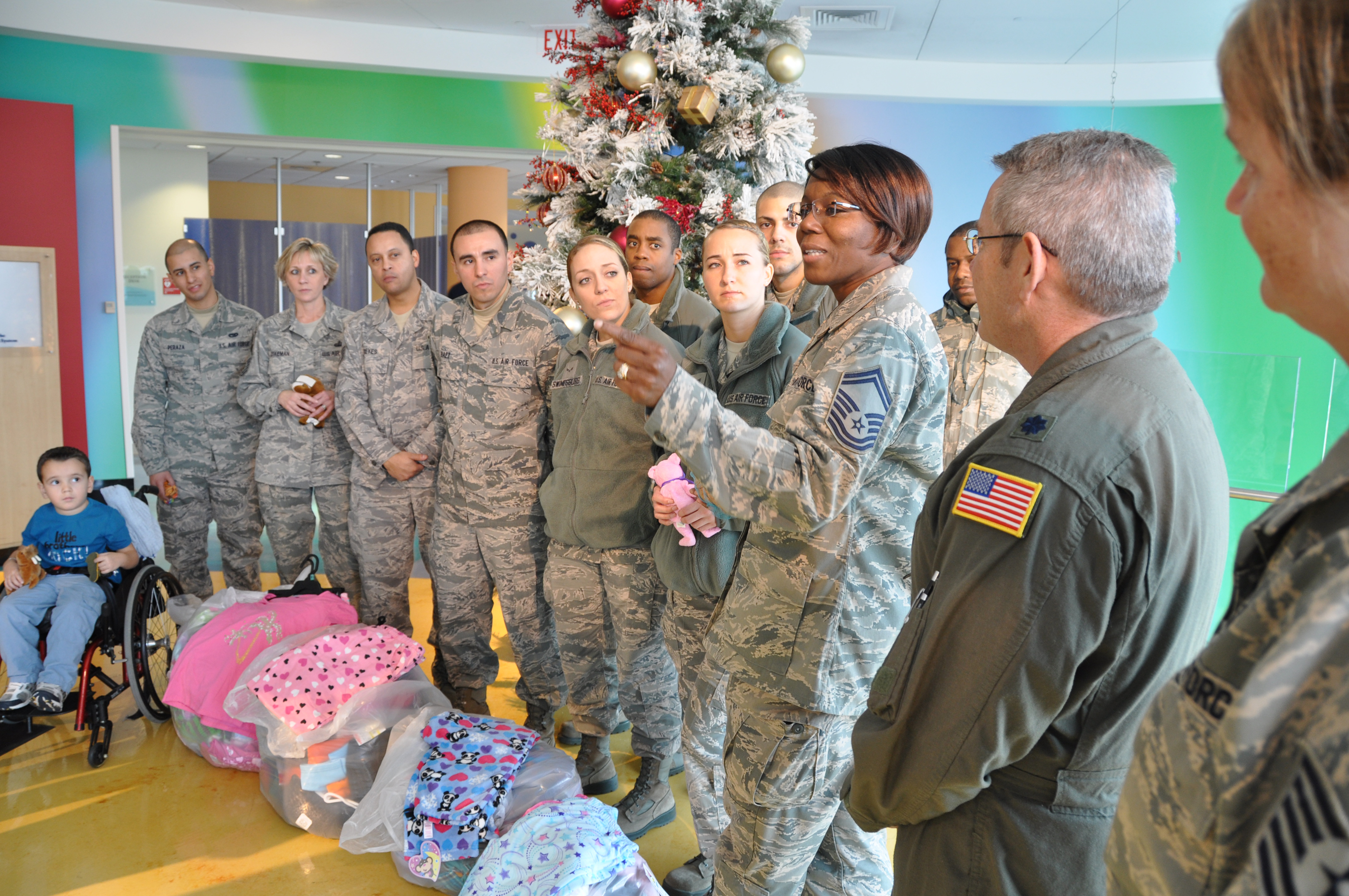
Airmen from the 514th Air Mobility Wing deliver pajamas and sweat pants

By 2010, had 13 locations in the state, with facilities handling both inpatient and outpatient, medical day care, long-term care, and specialty care.

It had 13 locations in New Jersey in 2016. These were in Mountainside, Fanwood, two in New Brunswick, Roselle Park, two in Toms River, Newark, Egg Harbor Township, Hamilton, Clifton, Bayonne, and Warren.

=== PSE&G Children's Specialized Hospital ===
The largest of the Children's Specialized Hospital locations, this inpatient acute care hospital features 140 beds. PSE&G Children's Specialized Hospital is located adjacent to The Bristol Myers Squibb Children's Hospital, the Child Health Institute, and Robert Wood Johnson University Hospital.

== Rady Children's Hospital Partnership ==
In 2019, Children's Specialized Hospital announced a partnership with Rady Children's Hospital, San Diego CA. The partnership helps to establish the first inpatient children's chronic pain program in Southern California. The program helps to provide pain relief for children and adolescents without using opioids. The new unit is branded with CSH's branding and the unit follows CSH policies on pediatric chronic rehabilitation and pain relief in children and teens up to the age of 21.

== Services ==
Children's Specialized Hospital treats a variety of medical conditions in patients aged 0–21 including:

- Autism
- Spinal cord injuries
- Infant and toddler rehabilitation
- Chronic pain management
- Developmental and behavioral issues
- Pediatric trauma services (ie, ventilator management, tracheostomy care, IV antibiotic administration, wound care)
- Brain injuries
- Physical Therapy
- Lymphedema (swelling due to the accumulation of lymphatic fluid around skin cells)
- Fetal alcohol syndrome
- Cerebral Palsy
- Neuromuscular and genetic disorders (ie, muscular dystrophy, spinal muscular atrophy, Guillain Barre syndrome, neuropathies, myopathies)

== See also ==
- The Bristol-Myers Squibb Children's Hospital
- RWJBarnabas Health
