= Rutgers Cancer Institute of New Jersey =

Coordinates: 40.496183°N 74.447916°W

Rutgers Cancer Institute
- RWJBarnabas Health, Rutgers Health

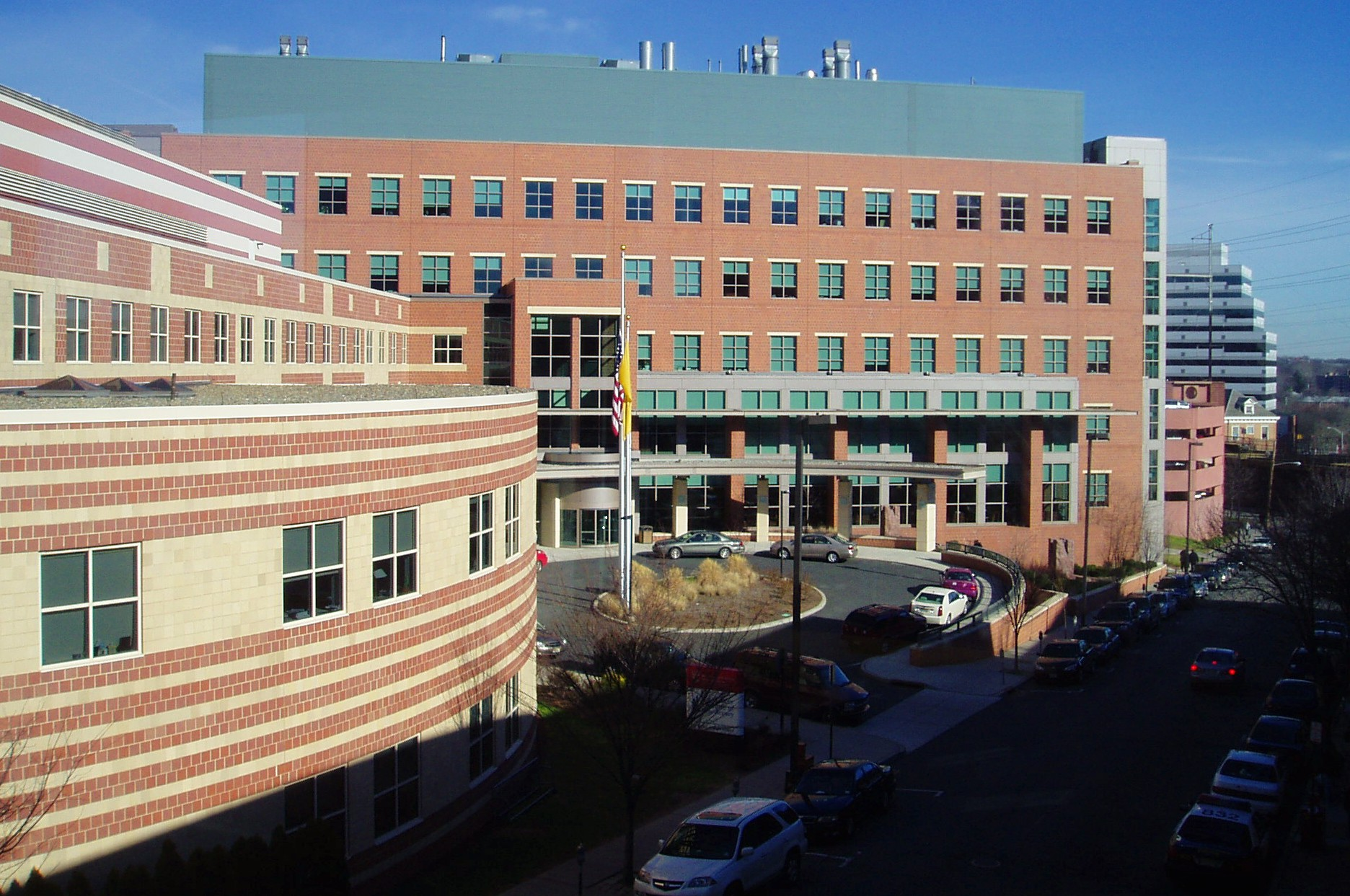

Geography

Organisation
- Funding: Non-profit hospital
- Type: Cancer
- Affiliated university: Rutgers University and Princeton University

Services
- Standards: NCI Comprehensive Cancer Center

History
- Opened: 1991

Links
- Website: https://www.cinj.org/

The Rutgers Cancer Institute is a cancer treatment and research institution that is a part of Rutgers University and located in New Brunswick, New Jersey. Rutgers Cancer Institute is one of only 56 Comprehensive Cancer Centers in the nation designated by the National Cancer Institute and the only one in New Jersey located in the heart of New Brunswick.

The Rutgers Cancer Institute is an Institute of Rutgers University and is located adjacent to Robert Wood Johnson University Hospital, which serves as its primary clinical affiliate. CINJ delivers comprehensive cancer care to both adults and children and conducts laboratory, clinical, prevention, and population research. Laboratory research at CINJ is supported by more than $99 million annually in cancer-related research grants. CINJ has over 850 employees and manages more than 120,000 patient visits annually.

== Facilities ==
Recent additions to the facility have tripled the square footage to 225,000 square feet (20,900 m^{2}), and the patient care setting was reconfigured to give it the feel of a much smaller institution. CINJ provides a Resource and Learning Center, where patients and their families can review the latest information on advanced therapies and new clinical trials. CINJ is physically connected by a sky bridge to RWJ University Hospital. The current CINJ does not have any inpatient beds and currently inpatients are either treated at The Bristol-Myers Squibb Children's Hospital (0-21) or Robert Wood Johnson University Hospital (21+).

== Jack & Sheryl Morris Cancer Center ==
In 2019, officials from RWJBarnabas announced that plans were made to construct a new 12 story, $750 million cancer hospital across the street from RWJUH. The new hospital would have 96 inpatient beds and many outpatient treatment bays. The site for the new hospital is currently a school, "Lincoln Street School" which RWJBarnabas would build a brand new $55 million school a few blocks away as part of the land acquisition. The additions are a part of a plan from RWJBarnabas officials to create a top 10 cancer hospital. The old buildings of the Cancer Institute are planned to become administrative offices when the new hospital building opens in 2024.

In May 2020, the Middlesex County Government announced a $25 million investment into the project along with a collaboration with Middlesex County College to introduce educational and job training opportunities for students at the college.

The ceremonial groundbreaking for the new building occurred on June 24, 2021 with attendees including New Jersey Governor Phil Murphy, CEO of RWJBH Barry Ostrowsky, and Rutgers University president Jonathan Holloway.

== Current leadership ==
In January 2017, Steven K. Libutti, MD, FACS became the third permanent Director of CINJ. In October 2017, H. Richard Alexander, MD, FACS, joined Rutgers as the chief surgical officer.

=== Past permanent Directors ===
- William N. Hait, MD, PhD 1993-2007
- Robert S. DiPaola, MD 2008-2016

== See also ==
- National Cancer Institute
- Robert Wood Johnson University Hospital
- Rutgers University
- The Bristol-Myers Squibb Children's Hospital
