= Saint Peter's University Hospital =

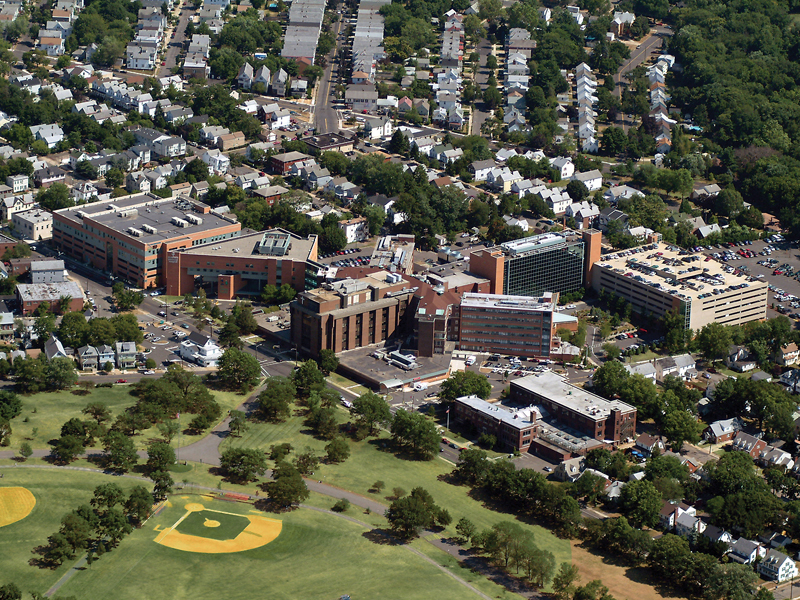
- Saint Peter's University Hospital, 2011 – pictured from left to right: CARES Surgicenter, Women & Children's Pavilion, Hospital, ER, Medical Office Building and Parking Deck.

Geography
- Location: New Brunswick, New Jersey, United States
- Coordinates: 40.5013°N 74.4596°W

Organization
- Care system: Medicare; Medicaid; Charity care Private insurance
- Type: Specialist
- Affiliated university: Rutgers University

Services
- Beds: 478
- Speciality: Teaching hospital

History
- Opened: 1907

Links
- Website: www.saintpetershcs.com/saintpetersuh/
- Lists: Hospitals in New Jersey

Saint Peter's University Hospital is a Roman Catholic hospital on Easton Avenue in New Brunswick, New Jersey. The hospital is a member of the Saint Peter's Healthcare System, a New Jersey nonprofit corporation sponsored by the Roman Catholic Diocese of Metuchen. From 1974 to 1998 it was known as St. Peter's Medical Center and from its founding in 1907 until 1974 it was known as St. Peter's General Hospital .

== Overview ==
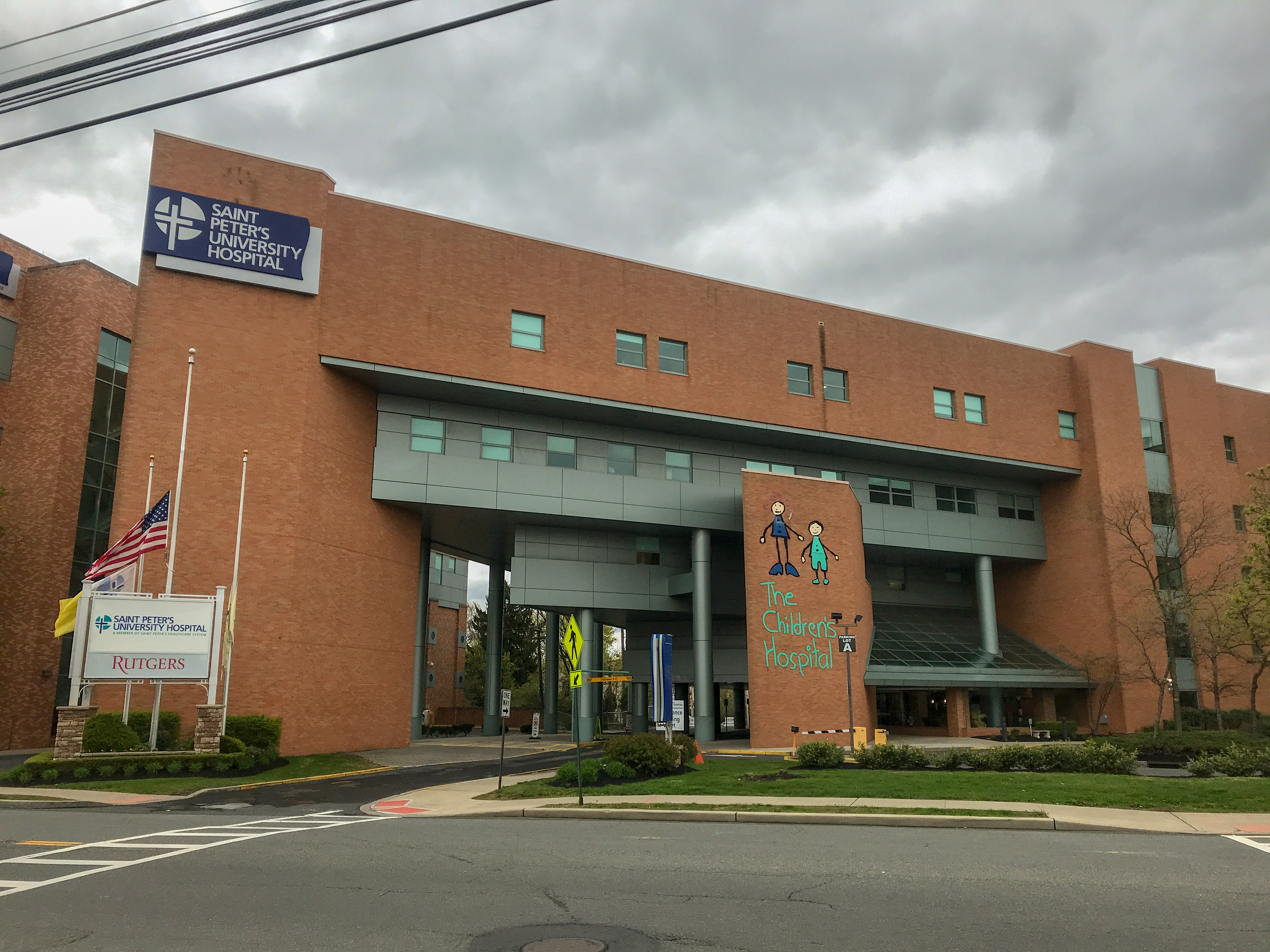
The woman and children's pavilion of Saint Peter's University Hospital, 2020

Saint Peter's University Hospital is a non-profit, 478-licensed-bed acute care teaching hospital. Saint Peter's has been designated by the state of New Jersey as a Specialty Acute Care Children's Hospital, Regional Perinatal Center, and Stroke Center that operates one of the largest maternity services in New Jersey and in the country.

The hospital is a major clinical affiliate of Rutgers Health, providing full-time training to as many as 60 students in their third or fourth years of medical school, and has a clinical affiliation with The Children's Hospital of Philadelphia.

== History ==
At its founding in 1907, it was named St. Peter's General Hospital. It opened on Somerset and Hardenburgh streets in New Brunswick, with 25 beds. St. Peter's moved to its current location at 254 Easton Avenue in New Brunswick in 1929 as a 125-bed facility. In 1959, a three-wing addition was constructed, with 349 beds.

In 1974, the hospital's name was changed to St. Peter's Medical Center.

The newborn nursery at St. Peter's Medical Center, 1988

In 1976, a five-story tower containing the emergency department, radiology department, operating and recovery suite, and a nursing unit was completed, that included a 40 beds in the nursing unit. In the early 1990s, The Women and Children's Pavilion was added.

In 1998, the institution's name was changed to Saint Peter's University Hospital.

In 1999 the Center for Ambulatory Resources (CARES) building was constructed. New telemetry, maternity and oncology units were completed in 2008.

In late 2019, it was announced that the leaders of RWJBarnabas Health and the leaders of Saint Peter's Healthcare System signed a letter of intent to explore a merger. The preliminary plan called for significant investments in Saint Peter's by RWJBarnabas Health to help expand the outpatient services currently provided by Saint Peter's. Saint Peter's would remain a Catholic hospital and continue its sponsorship by the Roman Catholic Diocese of Metuchen. According to administrations from both hospitals, the two parties had been in discussions for a while and believed they could both benefit from the merger. The merger would also strengthen education services provided at the two already Rutgers-affiliated hospitals.

On September 10, 2020, it was announced that the health systems had signed a definitive agreement that the two systems would merge. The merger would create the largest academic medical center in the state. After the signing of the agreement, the potential partnership began a period of review by state and federal regulatory agencies.

The Federal Trade Commission announced on June 2, 2022, that they were suing to block the merger, arguing that it would reduce competition between two major hospitals that were located less than a mile apart in the same city. As a result, the merged was dropped by the two parties.

== Awards and honors ==
- 1998, 2002, 2006, 2011, 2020 Magnet Recognition for Nursing Excellence, designated four terms in a row.

== See also ==
- Saint Peter's University
