= Community Medical Center (New Jersey) =

- RWJBarnabas Health

Geography
- Location: Toms River, Ocean County, New Jersey, United States
- Coordinates: 39.9642°N 74.2157°W

Organization
- Care system: Medicare; Medicaid; Charity; Private insurance
- Type: General

Services
- Standards: Joint Commission; NJPRO
- Beds: 592

Helipads
- Helipad: Yes

History
- Former name: Community Memorial Hospital
- Founded: 1961

Links
- Website: www.rwjbh.org/community-medical-center/
- Lists: Hospitals in New Jersey

Community Medical Center, known colloquially as CMC, is a fully accredited acute care hospital in Toms River, New Jersey, serving the entire northern Ocean County area. The hospital is Ocean County's largest and most active healthcare facility.

The hospital has been undergoing another expansion since 2004; when completed, the hospital will have the largest emergency department on the East Coast of the United States.

== History ==
Opened in 1961 as Community Memorial Hospital, it was initially a small facility, with only 50 beds and 15 physicians. The center expanded in the 1980s, adding a five-level parking garage and a four-story section of patient rooms.

Community Medical Center was the largest non-teaching hospital in New Jersey until July 2021, when the first round of residents were invited to the facilities under the academic medical program partnership with Rutgers University.

In 2015, Barnabas Health (parent organization of Community Medical Center) merged with Robert Woods Johnson Health System, making the Medical Center now part of RWJBarnabas Health, the largest academic health system in New Jersey.

The hospital has approximately 2,800 associates, 650 on-staff physicians, and 1,700 volunteers attending to 28,000 in-patients, 127,700 out-patients, and 100,000 emergency department patients each year.

Community Medical Center received its third Accreditation in 2002 from the Joint Commission.

== Departments and centers ==
=== Jay and Linda Grunin Neuroscience Institute ===
In 2013, the Grunin Foundation bestowed the hospital with a $3.5 million gift to establish a neuroscience institute at the hospital, equivalent to $4.84 million in 2025). The institute is an interdisciplinary group of specialists whose aim is to prevent, diagnose, and treat diseases of the brain, spinal cord, and the peripheral nervous system, including:

- Stroke
- Seizure disorders/epilepsy
- Dementia/Alzheimer's disease
- Movement disorders/Parkinson's disease
- Traumatic brain injuries (TBI)
- Neuromuscular disease
- Sleep disorders

The institute operates 24 hours a day and is open year-round.

The Epilepsy Center at CMC, part of the Grunin Neuroscience Institute, is recognized as a Level 3 adult and pediatric epilepsy center by the National Association of Epilepsy Centers. The center is one of 11 centers in New Jersey that meet the criteria to operate as a Level 3 or Level 4 center.

=== Cardiology ===
Due to serving a very high population of geriatric patients, at least 75 years old, CMC treats more patients with cardiac disease than any other hospital in the state without a cardiac surgery program. Provided services generally fall to one of two treatment centers:

- Non-Invasive Cardiac Lab (NICL), offering services such as stress testing, EKG, and cardioversion
- Invasive diagnostic services, such as pacemakers, transesophageal echocardiogram, cardiac catheterizations, and angioplasty (both elective and emergent)

=== J. Phillip Citta Regional Cancer Center ===
The center's focus is cancer prevention, detection, and treatment. It has been nationally recognized by the Commission on Cancer of the American College of Surgeons with accreditation since 1986. Currently, the Rutgers Cancer Institute provides services at the hospital.

Therapies provided at the center include:

==== Inpatient Oncology Unit ====
- Chemotherapy
- Biotherapy
- Radiation therapy and radioactive implants
- End-of-life care

==== Outpatient Infusion Center ====
- Chemotherapy
- Blood and blood products transfusions
- Antibiotic infusions

== Expansion project ==
In 2021, CMC announced a $600 million campus expansion and overhaul, the largest in the hospital's history in both scope and price, to take place over the following decade. The plans include a new parking garage, environmental updates to the existing facilities, and an additional 300,000 sq ft (28,000 m^{2}) building that will serve as the main hospital once completed.

Phase 1 of the project began at the end of 2021, with the demolishing of nearby, underutilized buildings and the expansion and upgrading of the hospital's emergency department. Phase 2 involves the building of the new facility, while Phase 3 addresses interior upgrades to the existing campus.
