= Saint Peter's Healthcare System =

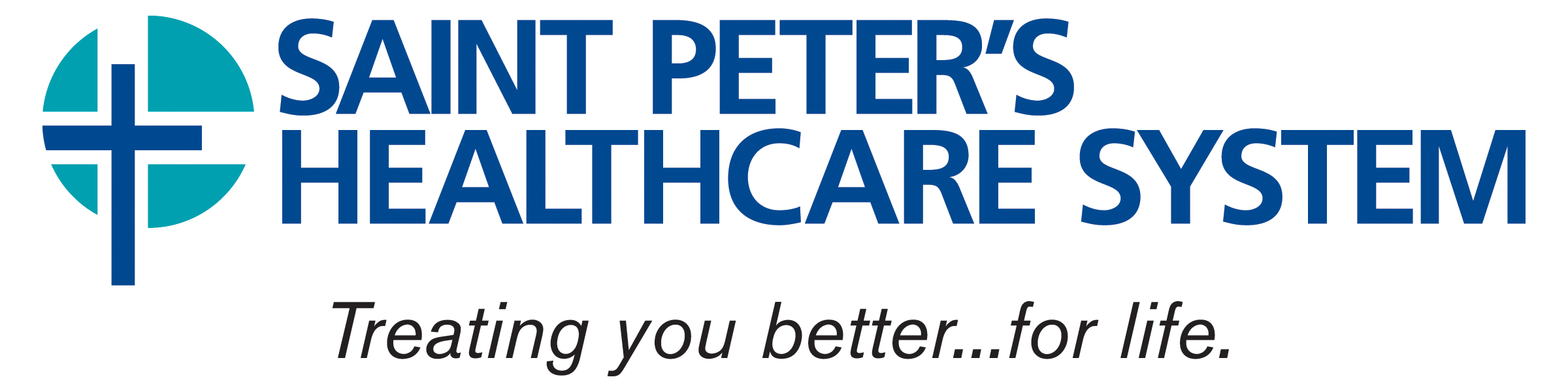
- Saint Peter's Healthcare System

Geography
- Location: New Brunswick, New Jersey, United States
- Coordinates: 40.5013°N 74.4596°W

Organization
- Care system: Medicare; Medicaid; Charity care Private insurance
- Affiliated university: Children's Hospital of Philadelphia; Rutgers University

History
- Opened: 2007

Links
- Website: www.saintpetershcs.com
- Lists: Hospitals in New Jersey

Saint Peter's Healthcare System (SPHCS) is a Roman Catholic healthcare system on Easton Avenue in New Brunswick, New Jersey.

== Overview ==
Saint Peter's Healthcare System was formed in 2007. Besides Saint Peter's University Hospital, the system includes the Saint Peter's Foundation and the Saint Peter's Health and Management Services Corporation, which oversees various initiatives, including the CARES Surgicenter, an ambulatory surgery center adjacent to the hospital in New Brunswick, and a Family Health Center in New Brunswick that serves, among others, juvenile victims of sexual abuse, economically disadvantaged families and mentally disabled and/or violence-prone youth.

In late 2019 it was announced that the leaders of RWJBarnabas Health and the leaders of Saint Peter's Healthcare System signed a letter of intent to explore a merger. The preliminary plan calls for significant investments in Saint Peter’s by RWJBarnabas Health to help expand the outpatient services currently provided by Saint Peter’s. Saint Peter’s would remain a Catholic hospital and continue its sponsorship by the Roman Catholic Diocese of Metuchen. According to administrations from both hospitals, the two parties have been in discussions for awhile and believe they could both benefit from the merger. The merger would also strengthen education services provided at the two already Rutgers affiliated hospitals.

On September 10, 2020 it was announced that the health systems had signed a definitive agreement that the two systems would merge. The merger would create the largest academic medical center in the state. After the signing of the agreement, the potential partnership began a period of review by state and federal regulatory agencies.

== Awards and honors ==
2013 & Before Awards & Recognition

- 1998, 2002, 2006, 2011 Magnet Recognition for Nursing Excellence designated 4 terms in a row.
- 2012 Intensive Care Unit (ICU) at Saint Peter's University Hospital earned its third Beacon Award for Critical-Care Excellence from the American Association of Critical-Care Nurses.

== Facilities and locations ==
- Saint Peter's University Hospital
- The Gianna Center
- Urgent Care Center in Skillman, NJ
- Sports Medicine Institute in Somerset, NJ
- Cardio Metabolic Institute
- The Breast Center
- Central Jersey Lung Center
- CARES Surgicenter
