= Clara Maass =

American nurse (1876–1901)

- Born: June 28, 1876; East Orange, New Jersey, U.S.
- Died: August 24, 1901 (aged 25); Cuba
- Resting place: Fairmount Cemetery
- Education: Christina Trefz Training School for Nurses
- Occupation: nurse

Clara Louise Maass (June 28, 1876 – August 24, 1901) was an American nurse who died as a result of volunteering for medical experiments to study yellow fever.

== Early life ==
Clara Louise Maass was born in East Orange, New Jersey, to German immigrants Hedwig and Robert Maass. She was the oldest of ten children in a devout Lutheran family. Clara's family was impoverished and to help alleviate the financial burden of one child on her family, she went to work as a "mother's helper" for a local woman while finishing high school after her family had failed in the farming industry. Her father had become a hatter and opened up a small grocery store to try to bring in more revenue. While she did not generate any income as a helper, she was still able to live and eat with her employer's family. Then at the age of 15, she began working at the Newark Orphan Asylum, and two years later, at the age of 17, Maass started nursing school at the Christina Trefz Training School for Nurses after being influenced by Florence Nightingale.

In 1895, she became one of the first graduates of Newark German Hospital's Christina Trefz Training School for Nurses. By 1898, she had been promoted to head nurse at Newark German Hospital, where she was known for her hard work and dedication to her profession.

== Army service ==
In April 1898, during the Spanish–American War, Maass volunteered as a contract nurse for the United States Army (the Army Nurse Corps did not yet exist), however, she was sent home because she came down with dengue fever. She then served with the Seventh U.S. Army Corps from October 1, 1898, to February 5, 1899, in Jacksonville, Florida; Savannah, Georgia; and Santiago, Cuba. She was discharged in 1899, but volunteered again to serve with the Eighth U.S. Army Corps in the Philippines from November 1899 to mid-1900.

During her service with the military, she saw few battle injuries. Instead, most of her nursing duties came in providing medical aid to soldiers suffering from infectious diseases like typhoid, malaria, dengue and yellow fever. She contracted dengue in Manila, and was sent home.

She went back to serve her country after hearing about the telegram that Major General William C. Gorgas had sent out asking for nurses to come volunteer in Cuba.

== Yellow fever studies ==
The number one cause of death during the Spanish-American war was typhoid fever, which accounted for 87 percent of deaths from disease in the national encampments. Yellow fever was also a problem in soldiers during the Spanish-American war, along with malaria, surpassing death on the battlefield and battle wounds.

Shortly after finishing her second assignment with the army, Maass returned to Cuba in October 1900 after being summoned by William C. Gorgas, who was working with the U.S. Army's Yellow Fever Commission. The commission, headed by Major Walter Reed, was established during the post-war occupation of Cuba to investigate yellow fever, which was endemic in Cuba. One of its goals was to determine if the disease was spread through mosquito bites or by contact with contaminated objects.

The Commission recruited human subjects because they did not know any animals that could contract yellow fever. In the first recorded instance of informed consent in human experiments, volunteers were told that participation in the studies might cause their deaths. As an incentive, volunteers were paid US$100 (approximately $4,000 today), with an additional $100 if the volunteer became ill.

In March 1901, Maass volunteered to be bitten by a Culex fasciata mosquito (now called Aedes aegypti) that had fed on yellow fever patients. Of 19 volunteers, she was the only female and American. By this time, the researchers were certain that mosquitoes were the route of transmission, but lacked the scientific evidence to prove it because some volunteers who were bitten remained healthy. Maass continued to volunteer for experiments and sent her mother the money she was given.

Maass was first bitten by mosquitoes in March of 1901, and then again in May, June, and finally in August. In those months she had come in contact with the yellow fever mosquitoes seven times. During her first bite, she became ill but only showed minor symptoms; this led researchers to believe she was not immune, so they continued to research and test with Clara as their live subject.

=== Motives ===
Firsthand accounts of Clara's motives are lacking. Sensationalized newspaper headlines portrayed her death as the result of financial desperation ("Sold Her Life for $100”) or the need to help her mother. Enrique Chaves-Carballo gives mostly personal reasons for participation, namely the desires to supplement her income and acquire immunity to the disease. Frieda Paton states that Maass believed it would help make her a better nurse since she would have a better understanding of what it is like to have the disease. Eleanor Krohn Herrmann argues that her reasons were fundamentally humanitarian, citing her knowledge of the severity of the disease and her lifelong desire to alleviate the suffering of others.

== Death ==
On August 14, 1901, Maass allowed herself to be bitten by infected mosquitoes again. Researchers were hoping to show that her earlier case of yellow fever was sufficient to immunize her against the disease. Unfortunately, this was not the case. Maass once again became ill with yellow fever on August 18 after receiving her final infection and died on August 24 at the age of 25. She had sensed something was different this time after becoming seriously ill, and wrote her mother a goodbye letter days before her death.

Her death roused public sentiment and ended yellow fever experiments on human beings. Her mother was distraught, telling one newspaper in the United States that her daughter's death seemed "little short of murder" to her.

Because of her contributions, Clara became known as a woman who gave her life in the name of science. Upon passing, she was first buried in the Colon Cemetery in Havana with military honors, but her body was moved to Fairmount Cemetery in Newark, New Jersey, on February 20, 1902.

Clara's work went relatively unnoticed until Leopoldine Guinther, the superintendent of the hospital in New Jersey, Newark German Hospital where Clara used to work, began to shed light on her story.

== Legacy ==
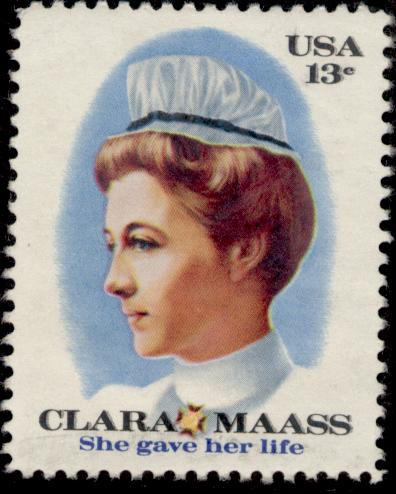
A 13¢ US postage stamp in Maass' honor. The caption reads "She gave her life".

Maass' work made the yellow fever vaccine possible. To honor her sacrifice, the Cuban government placed a bronze plaque at the Las Animas Hospital in Havana, where she died.

In 1951, the 50th anniversary of her death, Cuba issued a postage stamp in her honour. On June 19, 1952, Newark German Hospital (which had moved to Belleville, New Jersey) was renamed Clara Maass Memorial Hospital, and is now known as Clara Maass Medical Center. In 1976, the 100th anniversary of her birth, Maass was honored with a 13¢ United States commemorative stamp. She was the first nurse honored with a stamp and also the first to have a hospital named after them. Also in 1976, the American Nurses Association inducted her into its Nursing Hall of Fame. The Calendar of Saints of the Lutheran Church honors Maass and British nurse Florence Nightingale on August 13 as a "Renewer of Society." She was presented posthumously with the NSDAR Women in American History Award in May of 2024. The award is archived in the Spanish-American War Collection at the Jacksonville (FL) Public Library at the Main Downtown branch. During the Spanish American War, she served at the tent hospital Camp Cuba Libre in Jacksonville, FL from October 1, 1898 to February 5, 1899.

== See also ==
- Unethical human experimentation in the United States
