= The Bristol-Myers Squibb Children's Hospital =

Children's Hospital in New Jersey, United States

Bristol-Myers Squibb Children's Hospital
- RWJBarnabas Health

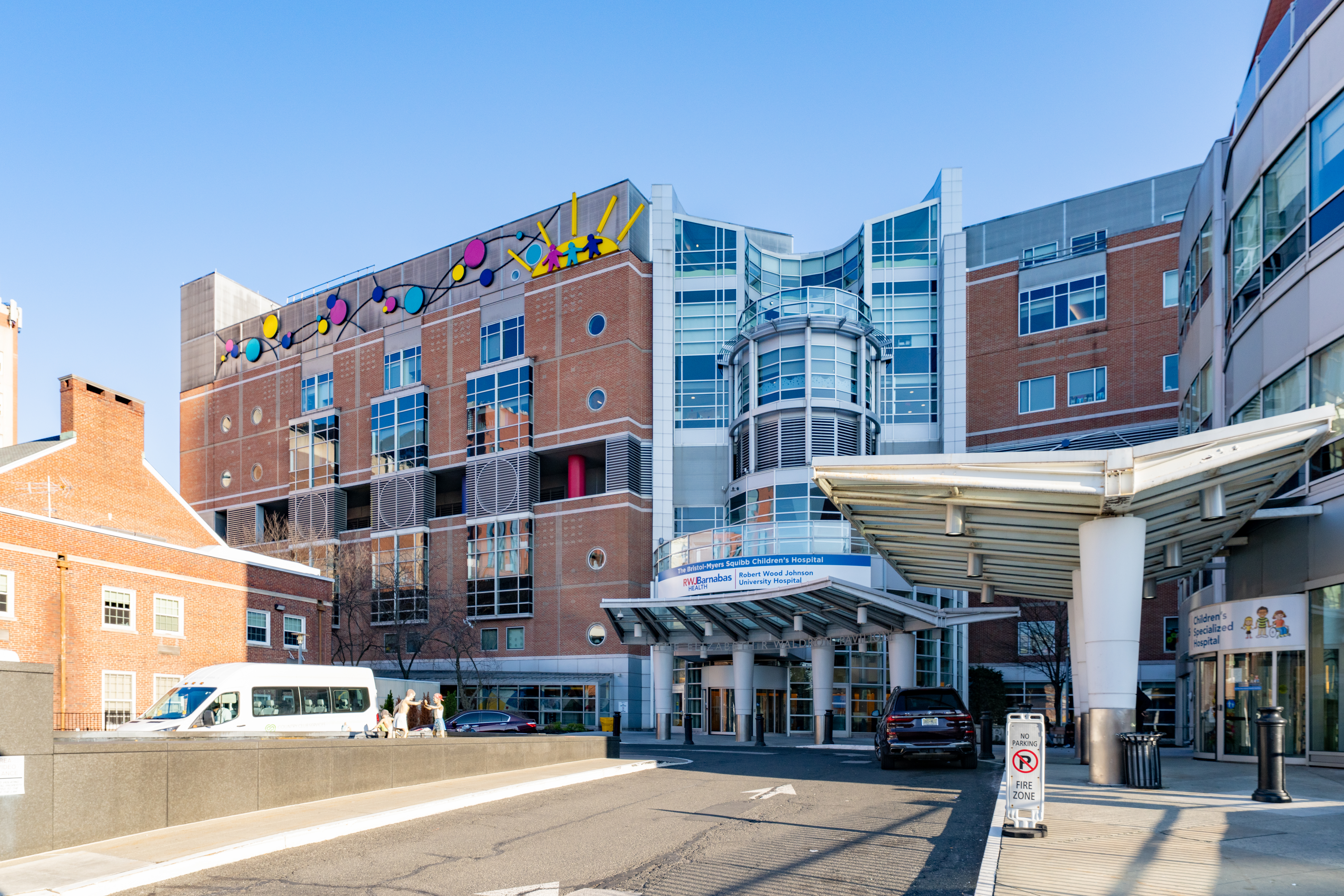
- Main entrance of BMSCH from Somerset Street.

Geography
- Location: 200 Somerset Street, New Brunswick, New Jersey, United States
- Coordinates: 40.494957°N 74.451098°W

Organization
- Type: Teaching
- Affiliated university: Robert Wood Johnson Medical School Rutgers University

Services
- Emergency department: Level I Pediatric Trauma Center
- Beds: 89
- Speciality: Pediatrics

Helipads
- Helipad: FAA LID: 9NJ4 (Shared with RWJUH)

History
- Former name: The Children's Hospital at RWJUH
- Constructed: 1998 (Lower Floors), 2007 (Upper floors added, renovated)
- Founded: March 2001

Links
- Website: http://www.bmsch.org
- Lists: Hospitals in New Jersey

The Bristol-Myers Squibb Children's Hospital at Robert Wood Johnson University Hospital (BMSCH) is a freestanding, 89-bed pediatric acute care children's hospital adjacent to RWJUH. It is affiliated with both Robert Wood Johnson Medical School and the neighboring PSE&G Children's Specialized Hospital, and is one of three children's hospitals in the RWJBarnabas Health network. The hospital provides comprehensive pediatric specialties and subspecialties to infants, children, teens, and young adults aged 0–21 throughout New Jersey and features an ACS verified level I pediatric trauma center. Its regional pediatric intensive-care unit and neonatal intensive care units serve the Central New Jersey region.

== History ==
Before the construction of the new children's hospital, pediatric services were provided at pediatric units within RWJUH, a "hospital within the hospital." These units were referred to as The Children's Hospital at RWJUH and featured 70 pediatric beds. In 1997, RWJ announced that a dedicated children's hospital would be constructed next to the adult hospital campus.

In 1999 it was announced that the name for the new hospital would be "The Bristol-Myers Squibb Children's Hospital" after the pharmaceutical company donated $5 million to the hospital.

Groundbreaking for the new dedicated children's hospital building occurred in June, 1998.

The hospital opened January, 2007 at a cost of $39 million. The hospital originally consisted of 5 floors and 125,000 square feet of space and 68 patient beds. When the hospital opened it was New Jersey's only freestanding children's hospital.

In 2004 a partnership between Morgan Stanley Children's Hospital of NewYork-Presbyterian and BMSCH to help with the creation of a pediatric heart surgery and cardiology program.

In 2005, the hospital extended up 3 floors adding 63,000 square feet of space for another $20 million. The hospital did not close during the expansion and remained operational.

In 2007, Bristol Myers Squibb Children's Hospital at RWJUH was joined by the PSE&G Children's Specialized Hospital and the Child Health Institute of New Jersey (RWJMS) to create the first pediatric medical campus in New Jersey, with pediatric acute care, rehabilitation, and research were combined on one campus.

In 2007, the hospital opened up a new unit named the "Center for Immune System Disorders and Infectious Diseases" to care for pediatric patients with immune system disorders or infectious diseases. The unit was funded from a $5 million donation from Bristol Myers Squibb pharmaceuticals.

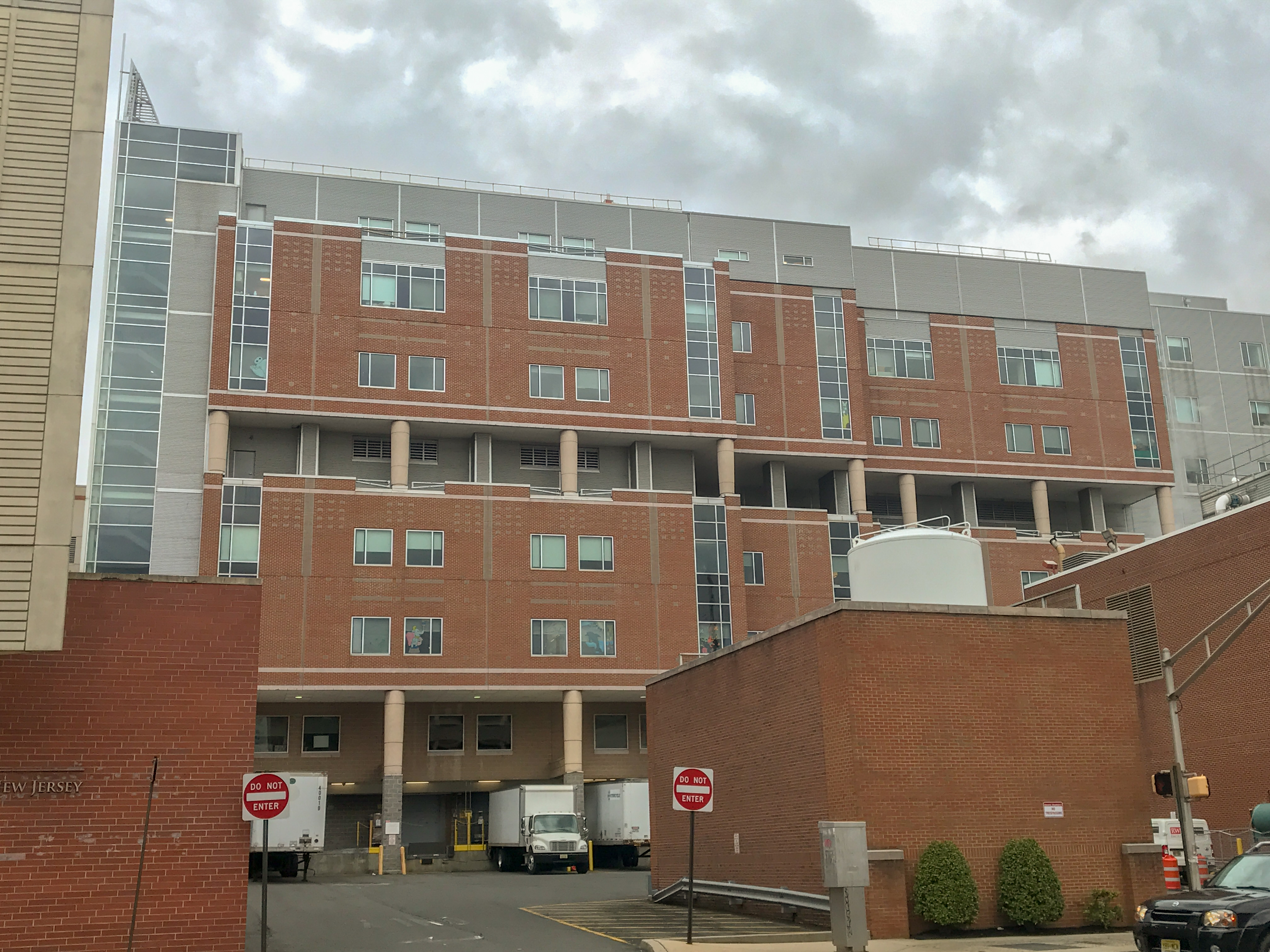
The back of Bristol-Myers Squibb Children's Hospital.

In 2012 Bristol-Myers Squibb Children's Hospital became the first hospital in New Jersey to be verified as a Pediatric Trauma Center by the American College of Surgeons. The pediatric emergency department and pediatric trauma center for the hospital are located adjacent to the RWJUH adult ed. The hospital was verified as a Level II Pediatric Trauma Center.

In 2013, Bristol-Myers Squibb Children's Hospital opened up a new $11.5 million, 17,000 square foot facility named "The Center for Advanced Pediatric Surgery." The new unit features 6 operating rooms, 10 pre and post operative beds and five private rooms in a PACU. This new unit helped to free up adult operating rooms and also helped to draw in skilled pediatric surgeons for the hospital.

In 2017 RWJBarnabas announced that they would be partnering with the Children's Hospital of Philadelphia to boost their pediatric capabilities by sharing physicians and best practices with all of the RWJBarnabas Health children's hospitals. The agreement will also send patients that the hospitals cannot handle to CHOP.

After the 2018 bankruptcy of Toys-r-us, liquidation sales were handled by attorney Joseph Malfitano who wanted to see the 16-foot-tall Geoffrey the Giraffe statue go to a children's hospital. He contacted the BMSCH who accepted the statue for their lobby, with Malfitano covering the $10,000 shipping cost. The statue was unveiled on July 11, 2018.

In 2019, the hospital opened up a new renovated pediatric emergency department adjacent to the RWJUH adult emergency room. The renovation created a space where pediatric patients aged 0–21 could be separate from adults that require treatment. The renovation added 17 private pediatric patient bays with three dedicated bays for behavioral health and a sensory room for children and adolescents with autism or sensory disorders. The renovation was a part of the larger RWJUH ED renovation which lasted two years and cost $60 million.

== About ==
The hospital features an AAP verified level 3 neonatal intensive care unit, one of the highest in New Jersey. The pediatric intensive care unit is the largest in the region and one of the most advanced in the state. The hospital also has a transport program with dedicated pediatric ambulances and helicopters to transport critically patients to and from the hospital.

=== Patient care units ===
- Adolescent Unit (CAD2) - General Inpatient 14-Bed Unit For Ages 12–21
- Neonatal Intensive Care Unit (NICU) - Advanced Level III 37-Bed Unit For Neonates In Critical Condition
- Pediatric Hematology-Oncology (CHO2) - Hematologic and Oncologic 10-Bed Unit For Ages 0–21
- Pediatric Intensive Care Unit - Critically Ill Unit For Ages 0–21
- Pediatric Unit (PED5) - General Inpatient 24-Bed Unit For Ages 0–11
- Regional Perinatal Center - Unit For High Risk Births

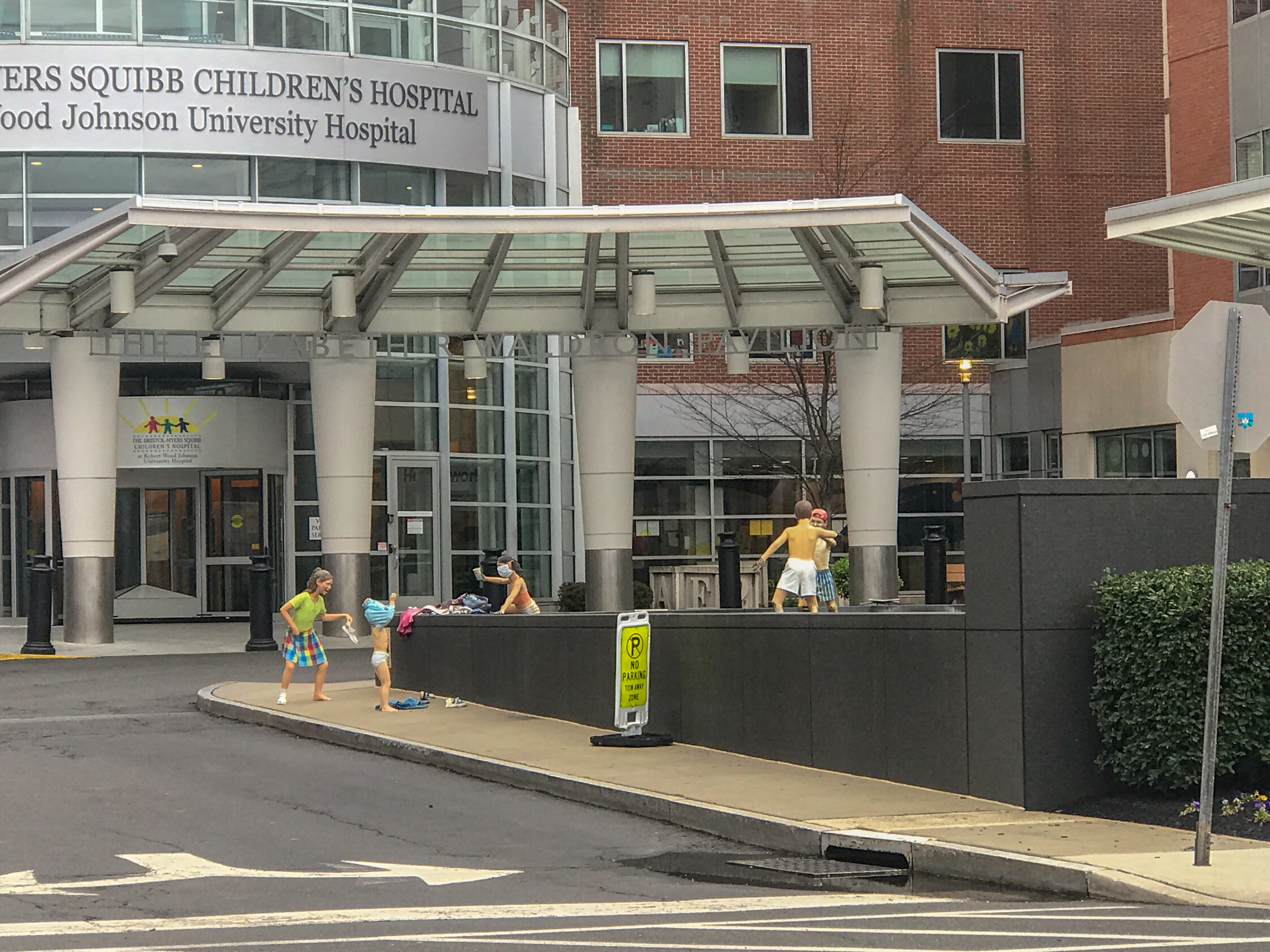
The Magic fountain outside of the Bristol-Myers Squibb Children's Hospital in New Brunswick, NJ

=== Magic Fountain ===
In front of the hospital is home to a sculpture called the Magic Fountain that was designed by local acclaimed artist J. Seward Johnson Jr. The fountain features metallic children playing in the fountain and splashing around.

=== Ronald Mcdonald House ===
Opened in May 2005, the Ronald Mcdonald House of New Brunswick is located two blocks away from the hospital. The goal is to house parents and families of pediatric patients aged 0–21 from the BMSCH, Children's Specialized Hospital, and the nearby St. Peter's University Hospital. The house provides places to sleep, meals, and entertainment to siblings and families for free.

== Rankings ==
In the 2012-13 U.S. News & World Report: Best Children's Hospital rankings for the United States, the Bristol-Myers Squibb Children's Hospital ranked 49th in pediatric orthopedics, 46th in pediatric pulmonology, and 35th in pediatric urology.

In 2018 the hospital was rated as the fifth best children's hospital in the New York area. BMSCH also ranked as the #2 children's hospital in New Jersey after Joseph M. Sanzari Children's Hospital.

== Services ==
Some of the hospitals' core services include:

- Adolescent Medicine
- Laboratory Services
- Otolaryngology
- Same Day Surgery
- Child Development and Behavior
- Maternity
- Pain Management
- Surgery
- Emergency Room Services
- Mental Health and Behavioral Health
- Pediatric Cardiology
- Transplant Services
- Hearing (Audiology)
- Neonatal Care
- Pediatric Urology
- Weight Loss
- Heart and Vascular Care
- Neuroscience
- Pulmonology
- Kidney Care
- Orthopedics
- Radiology

== Gallery ==
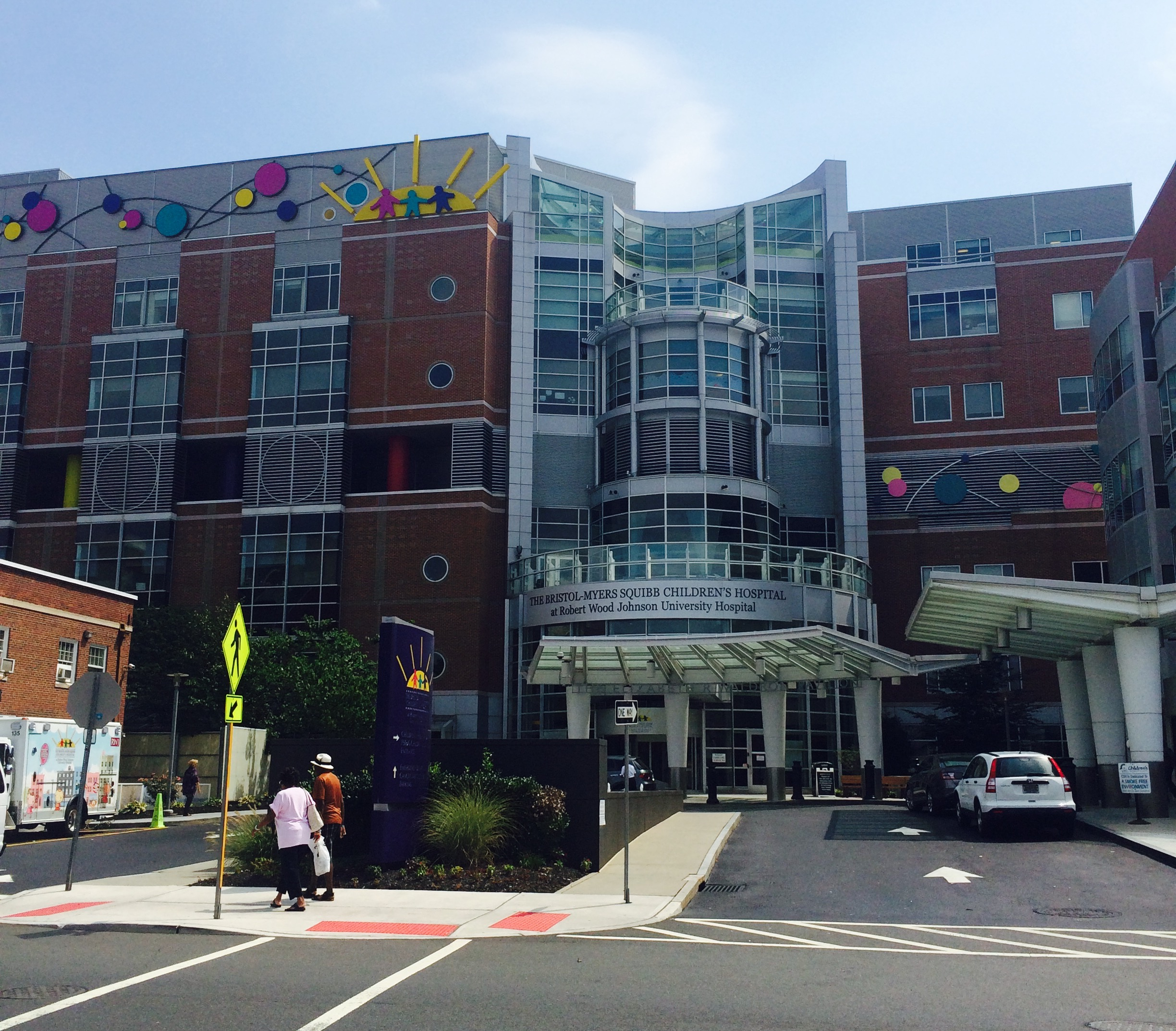
Another view of the facade.

== See also ==
- List of children's hospitals in the United States
- RWJBarnabas Health
- K. Hovnanian Children's Hospital
- Robert Wood Johnson University Hospital
- Joseph M. Sanzari Children's Hospital
