= Robert Wood Johnson University Hospital =

- RWJBarnabas Health

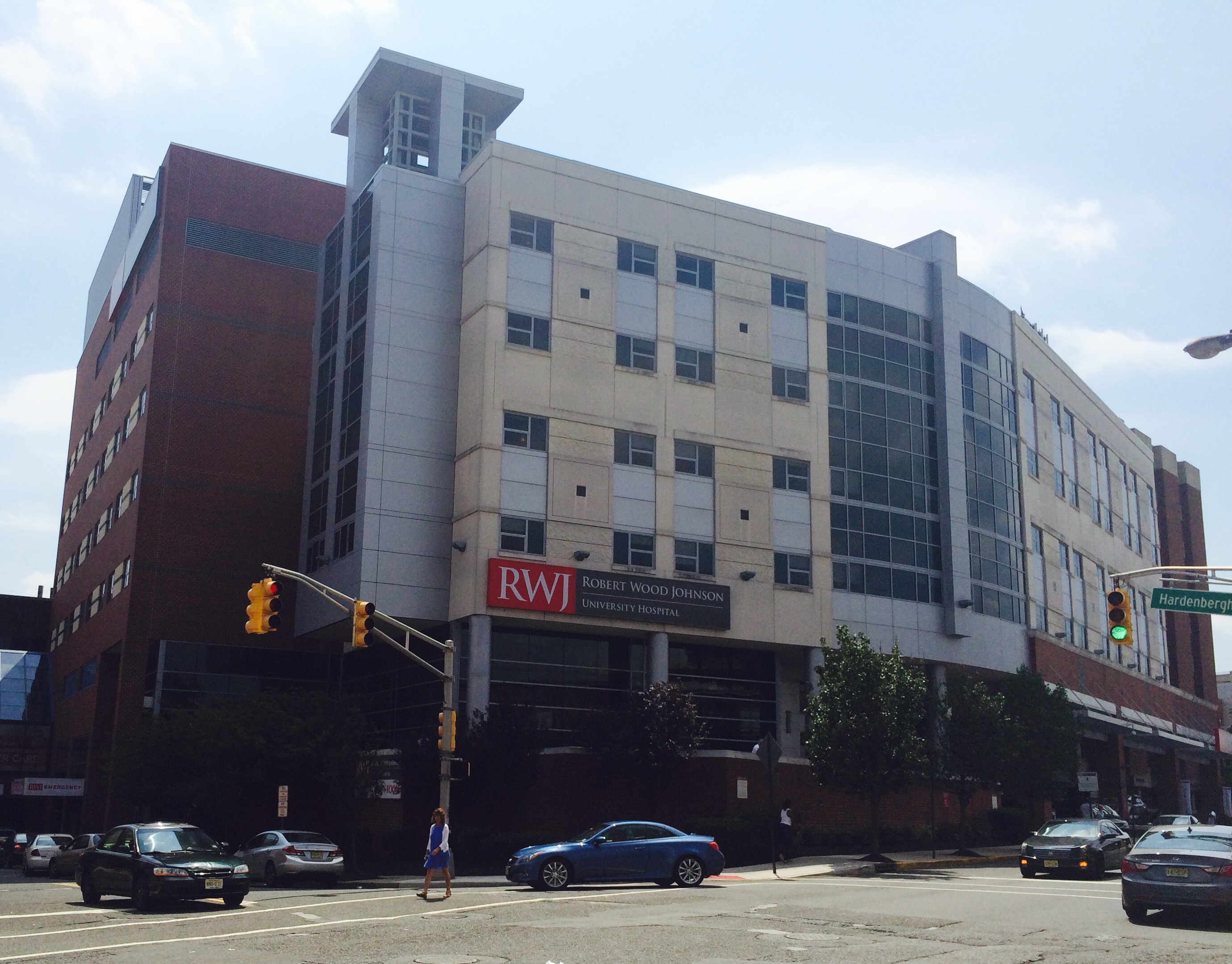
- The main entrance of the hospital.

Geography
- Location: • One Robert Wood Johnson Place, New Brunswick, New Jersey • 110 Rehill Avenue, Somerville, New Jersey, United States
- Coordinates: 40.495428°N 74.449217°W

Organization
- Type: Teaching
- Affiliated university: Robert Wood Johnson Medical School, Rutgers University
- Network: RWJBarnabas Health

Services
- Standards: American College of Surgeons
- Emergency department: Level I Adult Trauma Center / Level I Pediatric Trauma Center
- Beds: 965

Helipads
- Helipad: FAA LID: 9NJ4
Number	Length		Surface
Number	ft	m	Surface
1	50 x 50	15 × 15	concrete

History
- Founded: 1885 (141 years ago) in New Brunswick, New Jersey, United States

Links
- Website: rwjuh.edu
- Lists: Hospitals in New Jersey

The Robert Wood Johnson University Hospital (RWJUH) is a 965-bed hospital with campuses in New Brunswick (Robert Wood Johnson University Hospital New Brunswick), and Somerville, New Jersey (Robert Wood Johnson University Hospital Somerset), and serves as a flagship hospital of RWJBarnabas Health.

RWJUH New Brunswick is the flagship cancer hospital of the Rutgers Cancer Institute of New Jersey and the principal hospital of Rutgers University's Robert Wood Johnson Medical School. Its Centers of Excellence include cardiovascular care from minimally invasive heart surgery to transplantation, cancer care, and women's and children's care including The Bristol-Myers Squibb Children's Hospital at RWJUH, which has several areas of pediatric care. The hospital is also a Level 1 trauma center.

== History ==
The Robert Wood Johnson University Hospital was founded as the New Brunswick City Hospital in 1884, but it changed its name to the John Wells Memorial Hospital in 1889 when community leader and volunteer Grace Tileston Wells donated a building at the corner of Somerset and Division streets in honor of her late husband, John Wells. That first small building was expanded in 1916 to accommodate the growing area and renamed Middlesex General Hospital. In 1958, an addition to the hospital was built that housed the first vascular lab in New Jersey, an intensive care unit, cardiopulmonary lab, a thirteen-room operating suite, and increased the number of beds by 287. At this time, the Department of Clinical Research was established, X-ray technologist training began, and the hospital auxiliary was founded. In 1986, the hospital was renamed Robert Wood Johnson University Hospital after Robert Wood Johnson II, the former president and chairman of the board of Johnson & Johnson.

In 2014, Robert Wood Johnson University Hospital and Somerset Medical Center officially completed their merger.

In 2015, Barnabas Health and Robert Wood Johnson Health System signed an agreement which outlines the merger between these two health systems. Once complete, the transaction would create New Jersey's largest health care system and one of the largest in the nation. The New Jersey Attorney General must review the deal before it is official, with the expectation that the merger would be completed in 2016. On March 30, 2016, the two health systems officially merged and formed RWJBarnabas.

Additionally in 2015, the hospital opened The Laurie Proton Therapy Center. Made possible thanks to a lead gift from the Blanche and Irving Laurie Foundation as well as support from individual donors, it is currently home to the world's third MEVION S250 Proton Therapy System. The center treats prostate, breast, lung, head and neck, brain, pediatric, pancreatic, and other cancers with what is currently considered to be the most precise form of cancer treatment. Instead of using conventional radiation therapy to destroy cancer cells, proton therapy uses a beam of protons that can be aimed directly at tumors. There is less damage to surrounding tissue, and doctors can use a higher dose of radiation than conventional therapy. The treatment is painless, has mild side effects, and has minimal risk. Proton therapy is part of a comprehensive range of advanced cancer treatment options offered by RWJ in partnership with Rutgers Cancer Institute of New Jersey (CINJ), Rutgers Robert Wood Johnson Medical School and private physicians in the community.

== Robert Wood Johnson University Hospital, New Brunswick ==
Robert Wood Johnson University Hospital is a 610-bed non-profit, public, research and academic teaching hospital located in New Brunswick, New Jersey providing tertiary care for the Central New Jersey and beyond. The medical center is a part of the RWJBarnabas Health System and the flagship hospital of the system. Robert Wood Johnson University Hospital is affiliated with the Robert Wood Johnson Medical School. Robert Wood Johnson University Hospital also features a Level 1 Trauma Center, 1 of 4 in New Jersey.

=== Awards ===
The American College of Surgeons' Commission on Cancer has rated RWJUH among the nation's best comprehensive cancer centers and the hospital's Comprehensive Stroke Center is certified by the Joint Commission to provide complex stroke care.

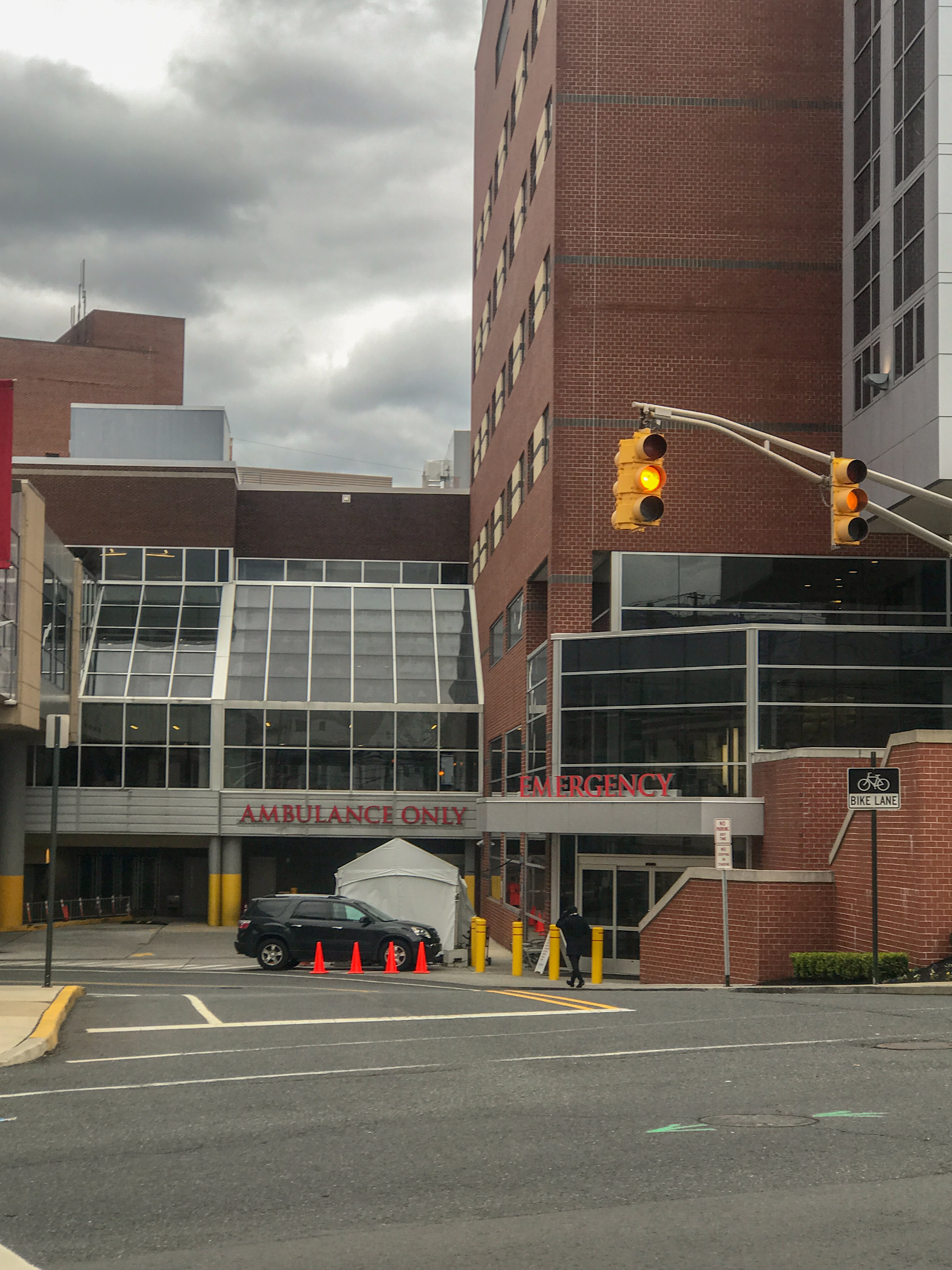
The emergency room and Level 1 Trauma Center of the Robert Wood Johnson University Hospital in New Brunswick, NJ

Harvard University researchers, in a study commissioned by The Commonwealth Fund, identified RWJUH as one of the top-ten hospitals in the nation for clinical quality. RWJUH is also a four-time recipient of the Magnet Award for Nursing Excellence. The Institute for Diversity and Health Management, an American Hospital Association (AHA) affiliate, has recognized RWJUH as a "Best in Class" hospital for diversity management and addressing health disparities.

In 2011 the hospital was listed on the "100 Top Grossing Hospitals in America" as the 45th highest grossing hospital in America by Becker's Hospital Review.

==== U.S. News rankings ====
RWJUH New Brunswick has been ranked among the best hospitals in America by U.S. News & World Report seven times and has been selected by the publication as a high-performing hospital in several specialties. The hospital is also listed as the best hospital in the Central New Jersey area.

In 2007 the hospital was ranked nationally in four specialties by the 2007-08 U.S. News & World Report: Best Hospital rankings. The hospital was ranked #40 in geriatrics, #26 in cardiology & heart surgery, #26 in respiratory disorders, and #50 in urology.

In 2008 the hospital was ranked nationally in two specialties by the 2008-09 U.S. News & World Report: Best Hospital rankings. The hospital was ranked #50 in cardiology & heart surgery, and #40 in respiratory disorders.

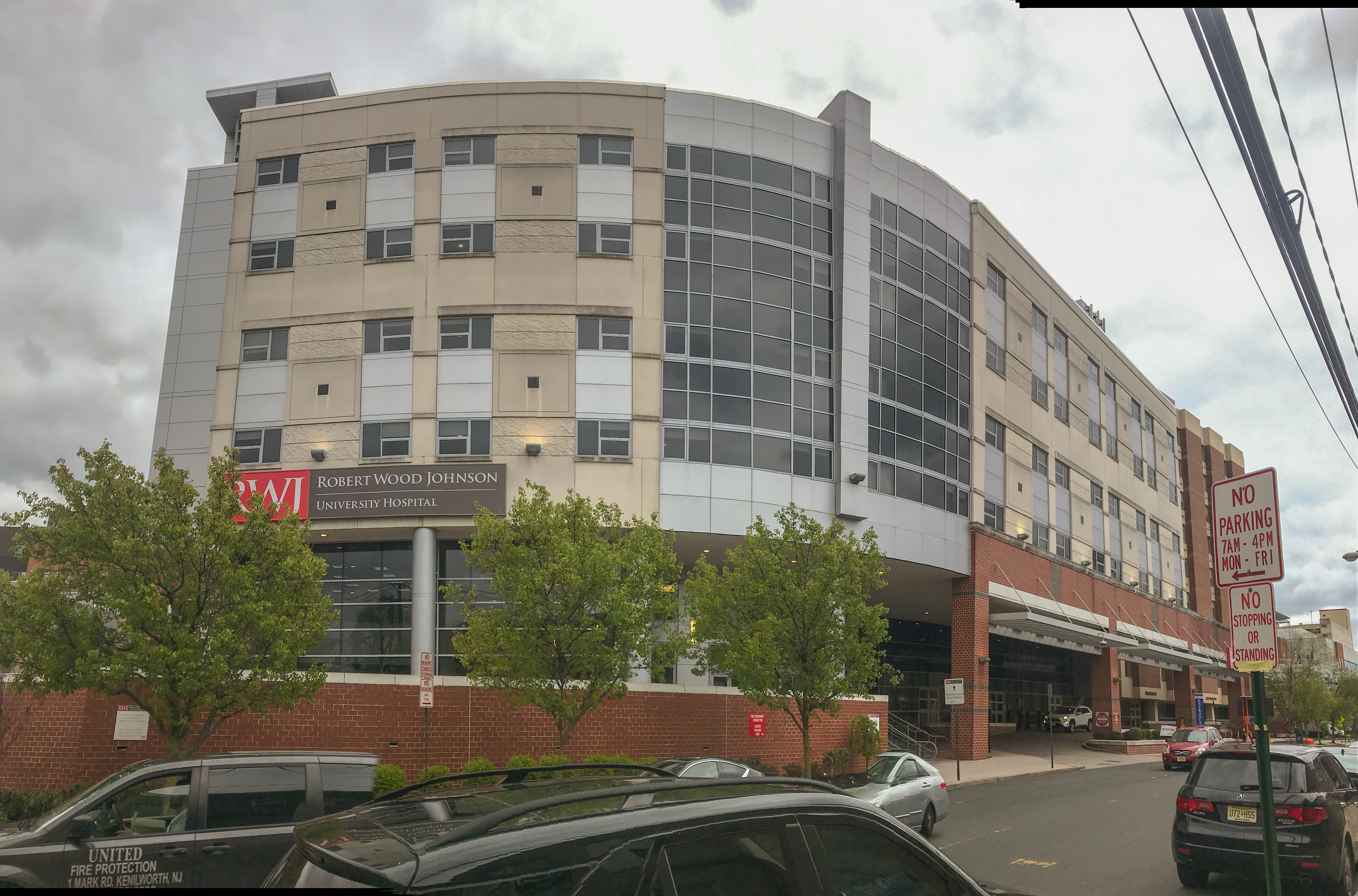
A panorama of the Robert Wood Johnson University Hospital in New Brunswick.

In 2009 the hospital was ranked nationally in three specialties by the 2009-10 U.S. News & World Report: Best Hospital rankings. The hospital was ranked #40 in cancer, #36 in cardiology & heart surgery, and #50 in respiratory disorders.

In 2010 the hospital was ranked nationally in one specialties by the 2010-11 U.S. News & World Report: Best Hospital rankings. The hospital was ranked #37 in pulmonology and respiratory disorders.

In 2011 the hospital was ranked nationally in one specialty by the 2011-12 U.S. News & World Report: Best Hospital rankings. The hospital was ranked #42 in pulmonology and respiratory disorders.

In 2012 the hospital was ranked nationally in three specialties by the 2012-13 U.S. News & World Report: Best Hospital rankings. The hospital was ranked #49 in cancer, #47 in geriatrics, and #37 in pulmonology.

In 2014 the hospital was ranked nationally in one specialty by the 2014-15 U.S. News & World Report: Best Hospital rankings. The hospital was ranked #50 in cancer.

== Robert Wood Johnson University Hospital, Somerset ==
Robert Wood Johnson University Hospital Somerset, a RWJBarnabas Health facility, is a nationally accredited, 297-bed regional medical center providing a variety of comprehensive emergency, medical/surgical, behavioral health and rehabilitative services located in Somerville, New Jersey. As a designated teaching hospital of Rutgers Robert Wood Johnson Medical School, the hospital maintains a family medicine residency program with 21 residents. Located on campus is the Steeplechase Cancer Center at RWJUH Somerset, a clinical research affiliate of Rutgers Cancer Institute of New Jersey, has been designated as a Comprehensive Community Cancer Center by the American College of Surgeons’ Commission on Cancer.

=== Awards ===
RWJUH Somerset is nationally recognized as a Magnet hospital for nursing excellence. Its Steeplechase Cancer Center is designated as a Comprehensive Community Cancer Center by the American College of Surgeons' Commission on Cancer – a distinction achieved by only one in four hospitals nationwide that treat cancer patients. The Joint Surgery Institute at Robert Wood Johnson University Hospital Somerset has earned the Joint Commission's Gold Seal of Approval for total knee- and total hip-replacement surgery. The medical center is designated as a Primary Stroke Center by the Joint Commission and the New Jersey Department of Health and Senior Services. It is one of nine Medical Coordination Centers established by the New Jersey Department of Health and Senior Services to coordinate communication among emergency responders during a disaster situation.

== Robert Wood Johnson University Hospital, Hamilton ==
Robert Wood Johnson University Hospital Hamilton is a 287-bed non-profit, public, research and academic teaching hospital located in Hamilton providing care for western New Jersey and beyond. The medical center is a part of the RWJBarnabas Health System. Robert Wood Johnson University Hospital Hamilton is affiliated with the Robert Wood Johnson Medical School. Robert Wood Johnson University Hospital Hamilton also features state designated Primary Angioplasty Site. The hospital is accredited by the Joint Commission and has earned an A on the Leapfrog Group's hospital safety grades. The hospital is also an accredited primary stroke center.

== Robert Wood Johnson University Hospital, Rahway ==
Robert Wood Johnson University Hospital, Rahway formerly Rahway Hospital, is a 122-bed non-profit, public, research and academic teaching hospital located in Rahway, New Jersey providing care for the Central New Jersey and beyond. The medical center is a part of the RWJBarnabas Health System. Robert Wood Johnson University Hospital, Rahway is affiliated with the Robert Wood Johnson Medical School. Robert Wood Johnson University Hospital also features an emergency department for area residents.

== Bristol-Myers Squibb Children's Hospital ==
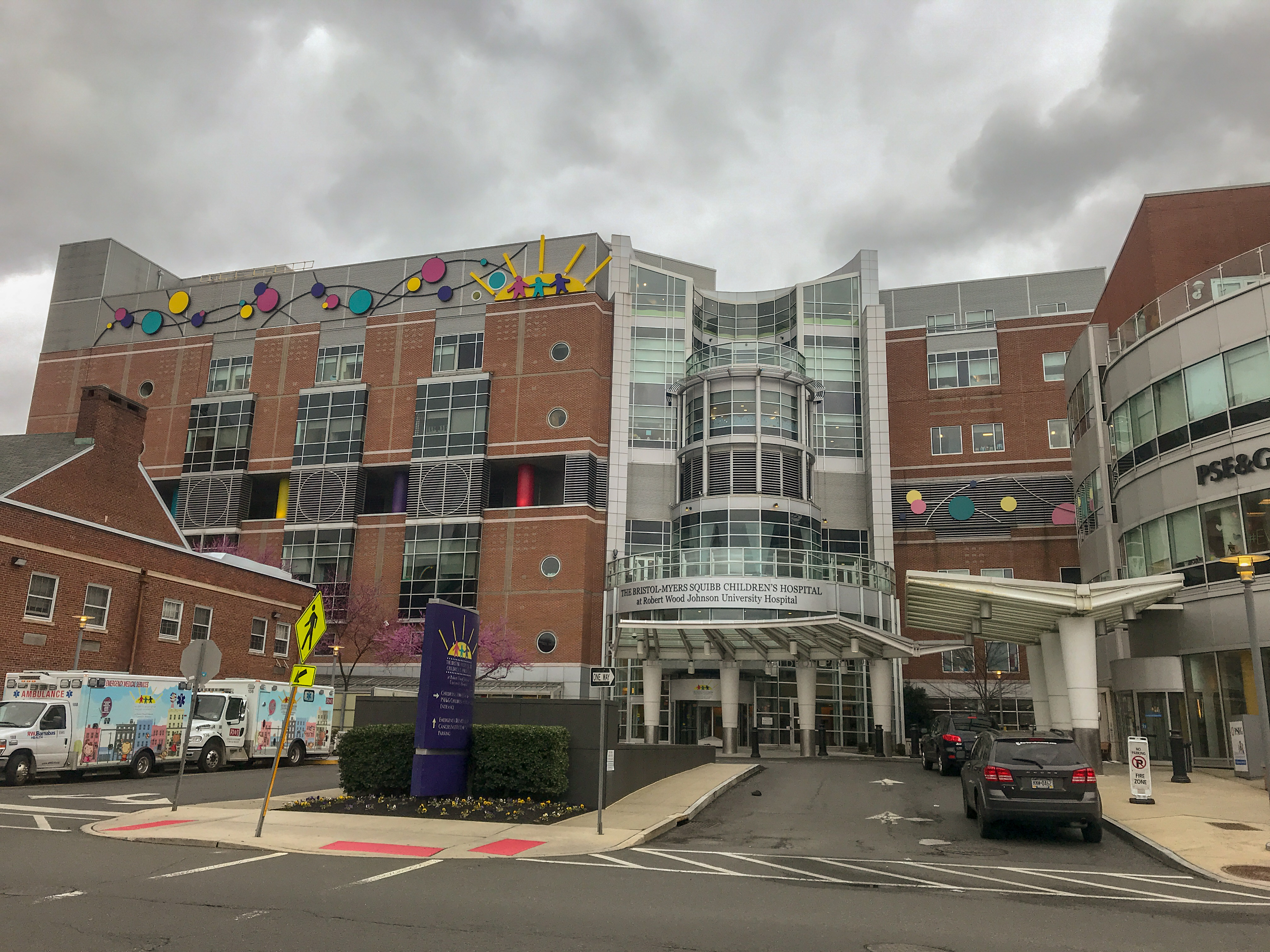
The front facade of the neighboring Bristol-Myers Squibb Children's Hospital.

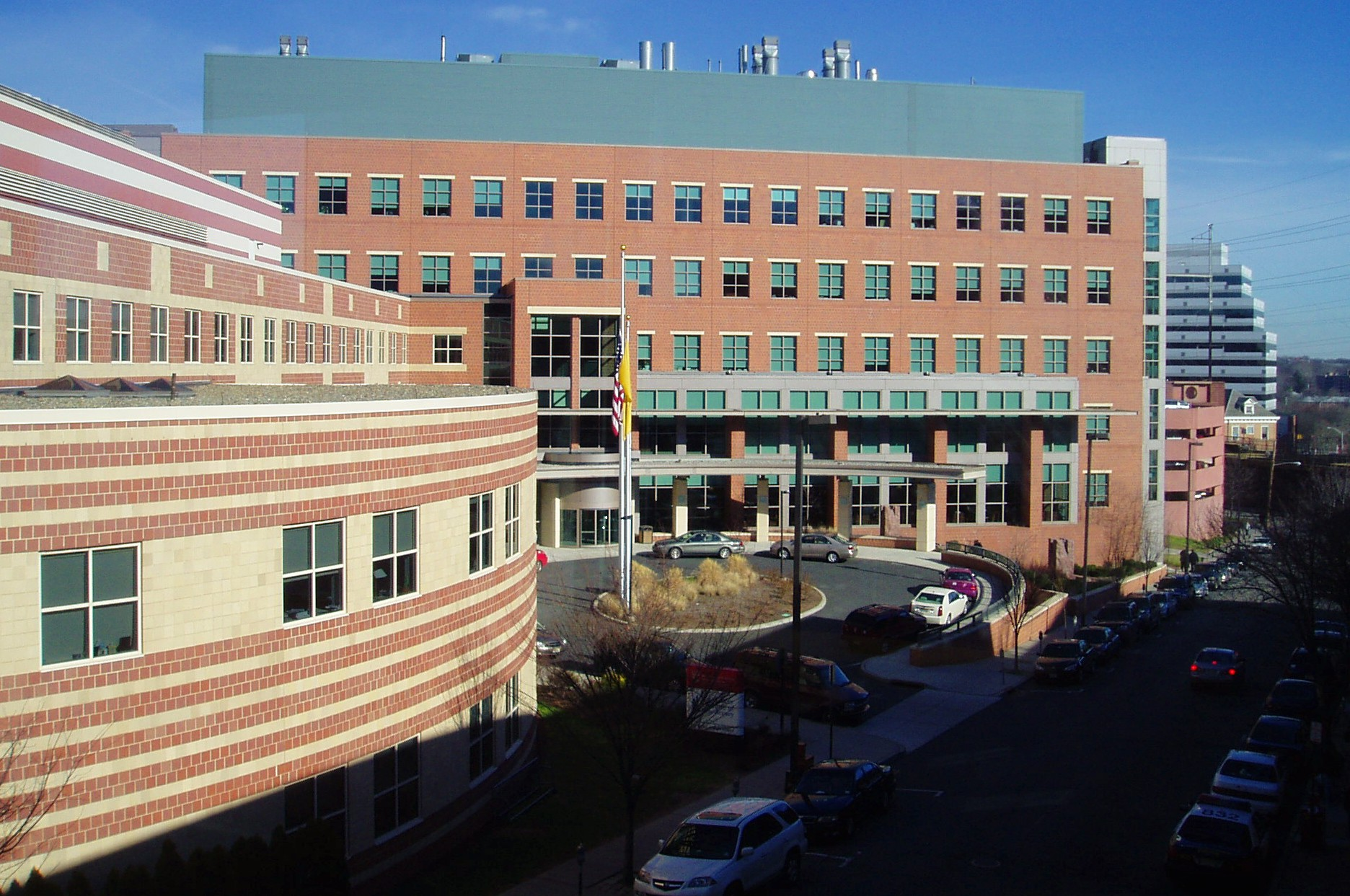
Cancer Institute of New Jersey

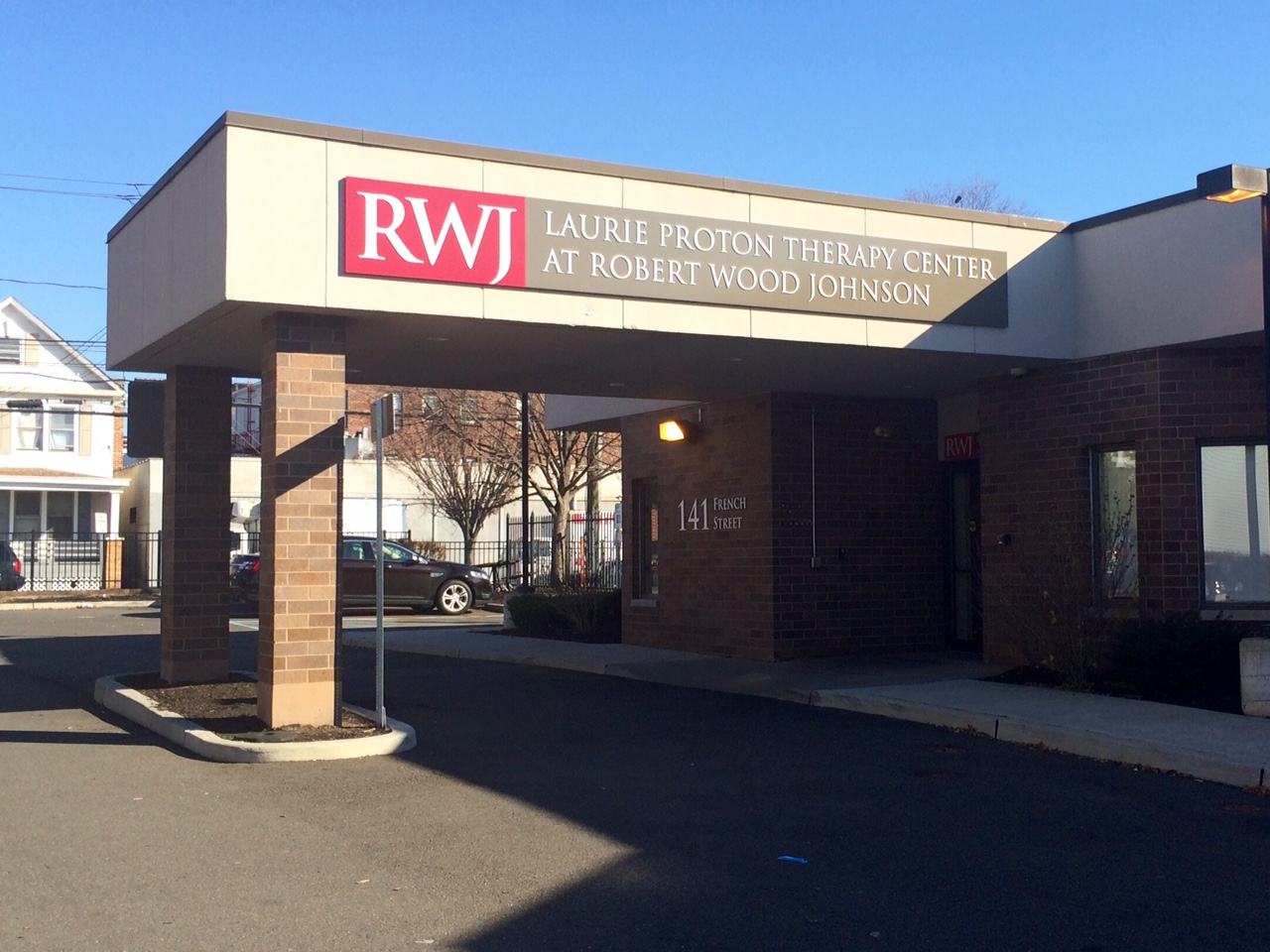
Laurie Proton Therapy Center in New Brunswick, NJ.

The Bristol-Myers Squibb Children's Hospital (BMSCH) at Robert Wood Johnson University Hospital (RWJUH) is a freestanding 105-bed, pediatric acute care facility adjacent to RWJUH. It is affiliated with both Robert Wood Johnson Medical School and PSE&G Children's Specialized Hospital, and is a member of RWJBarnabas Health. The hospital provides comprehensive pediatric specialties and subspecialties to infants, children, teens, and young adults aged 0–21 throughout New Jersey. The hospital features a level I pediatric trauma center and its regional pediatric intensive-care unit and neonatal intensive care units serve the Central New Jersey region.

=== Awards ===
The Bristol-Myers Squibb Children's Hospital has also ranked among the nation's Best Children's Hospitals by U.S. News & World Report for three consecutive years.

== Rutgers Cancer Institute of New Jersey ==
The Rutgers Cancer Institute of New Jersey (CINJ) is a cancer treatment and research institution that is a part of Rutgers University and located in New Brunswick, New Jersey. CINJ is one of only 51 Comprehensive Cancer Centers in the nation designated by the National Cancer Institute and the only one in New Jersey located in the heart of New Brunswick. The Rutgers Cancer Institute of New Jersey is an Institute of Rutgers Health at Rutgers University and is located adjacent to Robert Wood Johnson University Hospital, which serves as its primary clinical affiliate.

In 2019, officials from RWJBarnabas announced that plans were made to construct a new 12 story, $750 million cancer hospital across the street from RWJUH. The new hospital would have 96 inpatient beds and many outpatient treatment bays. The proposed site for the hospital is currently an old school, "Lincoln Street School" which RWJBarnabas would build a brand new $55 million school a few blocks away as part of the land acquisition. The additions are a part of a plan from RWJBarnabas officials to create a top 10 cancer hospital.

== See also ==
- List of hospitals in New Jersey
- List of teaching hospitals
