= Monmouth Medical Center Southern Campus =

Coordinates: 40.0731°N 74.2185°W

- RWJBarnabas Health

Geography
- Location: 600 River Avenue (Route 9); Lakewood, New Jersey, U.S.

Organisation
- Care system: Medicare; Medicaid; Charity care Commercial insurance
- Type: General
- Affiliated university: None

Services
- Standards: JCAHO; NJPRO
- Emergency department: Yes
- Beds: 350

History
- Opened: 1913

Links
- Website: https://www.rwjbh.org/monmouth-medical-center-southern-campus/
- Lists: Hospitals in U.S.

Monmouth Medical Center Southern Campus, formerly Kimball Medical Center and before that, Paul Kimball Hospital, is a hospital located in Lakewood, New Jersey, United States, that serves parts of northern Ocean County and southern Monmouth County. The hospital is affiliated with Barnabas Health. Monmouth Medical Center Southern Campus also operates two satellite facilities: a psychiatric hospital known as Barnabas Health Behavioral Health Center, formerly Kimball Behavioral Health, (with 100 inpatient beds) in Toms River, NJ and The Center for Healthy Living in Lakewood.

== History ==
In the early 1900s, a group formed to raise funds for the first hospital in Ocean County. The hospital opened on May 1, 1913, with 16 beds and 9 physicians, and was named after Dr. Paul Kimball, who had practiced over 20 years in Lakewood. Its first major expansion, in 1923, added 40 beds, a new kitchen, dining room, and operating suite.

Victims from the 1930s catastrophes of the Hindenburg Disaster and the SS Morro Castle were rescued and treated by staff from Paul Kimball Hospital. The 1940s saw the addition of a contagious disease unit, and the 1950s saw another major expansion to 148 beds. By the 1960s, the hospital had new radiology, laboratory, emergency, and outpatient departments, as well as the addition of air conditioning.

1971 saw yet another expansion to 235 beds, as well as the addition of the Intensive Care Unit and the Coronary Care Unit. The next major phase, in 1984, increased beds to 354, and the hospital was renamed Kimball Medical Center to reflect the scope of services. In the 1990s, the once-tiny hospital was transformed to be a major medical center within Barnabas Health. By 2007, Kimball was treating over 55,000 emergency patients per year.

In 2014, Barnabas Health announced it was merging Kimball Medical Center with Monmouth Medical Center in Long Branch, New Jersey, and removing the Kimball name, making it Monmouth Medical Center, Southern Campus.
