= Developmental Neurorehabilitation =

- Discipline: Neurology
- Language: English
- Edited by: Russell Lang and Wendy Machalicek

Publication details
- Former name: Pediatric Rehabilitation
- History: 1997–present
- Publisher: Taylor and Francis Group
- Frequency: Bimonthly
- Impact factor: 2.05 (2014)

Standard abbreviations
- ISO 4: Dev. Neurorehabilit.
- NLM: Dev Neurorehabil

Indexing
- CODEN: PEREFP
- ISSN: 1751-8423 (print); 1751-8431 (web)
- OCLC no.: 122931414

Links
- Journal homepage

Developmental Neurorehabilitiation is a peer-reviewed medical journal which covers research into recovery and rehabilitation in children with brain injury and neurological disorders. The editors of Developmental Neurorehabilitation are Russell Lang Texas State University and Wendy Machalicek University of Oregon.

The journal is focused on a developmental perspective: the longitudinal consequences of neurological insult during childhood and the impact of such injury in later life. It covers childhood neurological disorders and treatment, encompassing factors of lifespan, neurological recovery and intervention at experimental, clinical and theoretical levels.

Developmental Neurorehabilitation is indexed in ACNR, Cinahl, EBSCO Online, Elsevier Bibliographic Databases, Family Index Database, Index Medicus/MEDLINE, Journal Citation Reports/Science Edition (Thomson Reuters), Neuroscience Citation Index, PEDro, PsycINFO, PubMed, RECAL Information Services, Science Citation Inex Expanded (SciSearch), and Scopus.
