= Clara Maass Medical Center =

Coordinates: 40.7857°N 74.1763°W

- RWJBarnabas Health

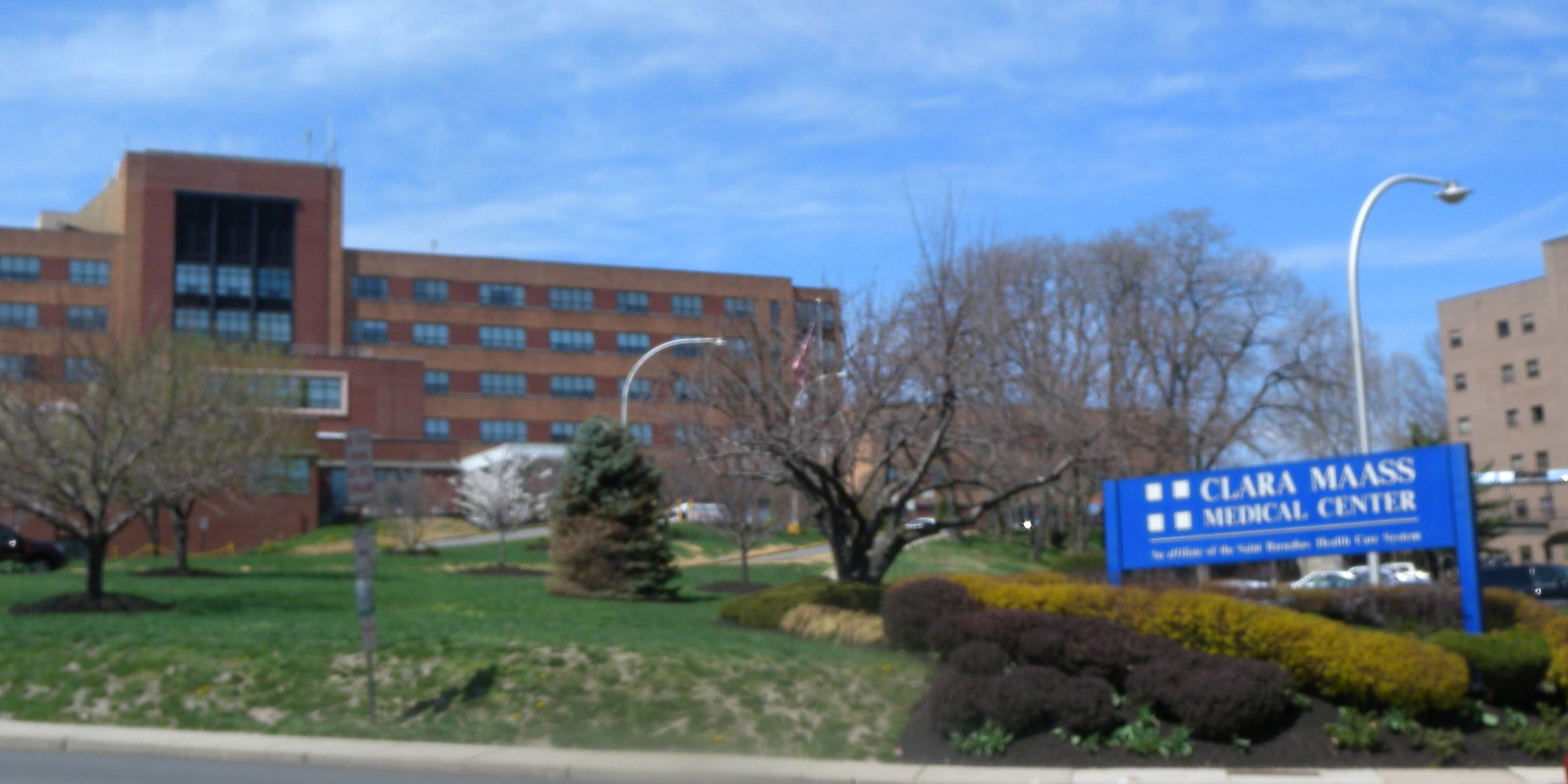

Geography
- Location: Belleville, Essex County, New Jersey, United States

Organization
- Type: General
- Affiliated university: None

Services
- Beds: 342

History
- Opened: 1868

Links
- Website: https://www.rwjbh.org/clara-maass-medical-center
- Lists: Hospitals in New Jersey

Clara Maass Medical Center is a 342- bed hospital in Belleville, Essex County, New Jersey, United States, that is part of the RWJBarnabas Health system. It was founded in 1868 as the Newark German Hospital, and was renamed in 1952 in honor of Clara Maass, a former nurse who trained there at the hospital's Christina Trefz Training School for Nurses, and become the hospital's head nurse. Maass' 1901 death during yellow fever experiments attracted national attention.

In 1956 a new building was completed in Belleville, which is sometimes referred to as "The Hospital in the Park" due to its location opposite Branch Brook Park. In 2022, the hospital was staffed by over 700 physicians with 2,100 total employees.
