= Newark Beth Israel Medical Center =

- RWJBarnabas Health

Geography
- Location: Newark, Essex County, New Jersey, United States
- Coordinates: 40.709831°N 74.212512°W

Organization
- Affiliated university: New Jersey Medical School

Services
- Emergency department: Yes
- Beds: 665

History
- Founded: 1902

Links
- Website: http://www.rwjbh.org/NewarkBeth
- Lists: Hospitals in New Jersey

Newark Beth Israel Medical Center (NBIMC), previously Newark Beth Israel Hospital, is a 665-bed quaternary care, teaching hospital located in Newark, New Jersey serving the healthcare needs for Newark and the Northern Jersey area. The hospital is owned by the RWJBarnabas Health System and is the third-largest hospital in the system.

NBIMC is affiliated with the New Jersey Medical School of Rutgers University and features over 100 residents. It has an adult and pediatric emergency department, but serious trauma is usually handled by the nearby University Hospital. Attached to the medical center is the Children's Hospital of New Jersey, which treats infants and young people up to age 21.

== History ==
The hospital was run under auspices of the Newark Jewish Community and its suburban successors from its inception in 1900–1901 until its purchase by RWJBarnabas Health in 1996.

In 2011, the Newark Beth Israel Medical Center was ranked among the top 50 hospitals in the United States for specialty care in cardiology and heart surgery. The following year, it remained highly ranked but was not in the top 50 hospitals nationwide.

Newark Beth Israel Medical Center is home to one of the nation's ten largest heart transplant centers, according to Becker's Hospital Review.

In 2020, the hospital was given an "A" by the Leapfrog Hospital Safety Grade.

In October 2020, the hospital began a $100 million project to expand and modernize the facility, including the emergency room, intensive care units, a new cardiac center and maternity unit.

== Services ==
- Cancer
- Heart and vascular care
- Men's health
- Maternal-Fetal Medicine (High-Risk Pregnancy)
- Mental health and behavioral health
- Neuroscience
- Neonatal Intensive Care (NICU)
- Obstetrics & Gynecology
- Orthopedics
- Pediatrics
- Senior health
- Transplant services
- Weight loss and Bariatric surgery
- Wellness
- Women's health

== Awards & Accreditations ==
- American Association of Blood Banks: Accredited Laboratory Services
- American College of Cardiology: Performance Achievement Award for Cardiac Care, Gold, 2014; Silver, 2017
- American College of Radiology: Breast Imaging Center of Excellence; Diagnostic Imaging Center Excellence; Designated Lung Cancer Screening Center
- American College of Surgeons’ Commission on Cancer: Silver Level Accreditation and Commendation
- American Heart Association: Distinguished Physician-Harvey E. Nussbaum Award, 2017; Mission Lifeline for STEMI, 2011 (bronze); 2012 (silver); 2013-2016 (gold); Get with the Guidelines Gold Award-Heart Failure, 2011-2013; Get with the Guidelines Gold Award-Resuscitation, 2017 - 2022
- American Society of Clinical Oncology: Quality Oncology Practice Initiative Certification
- College of American Pathologists: Accredited Laboratory and Pathology Services
- Competency & Credentialing Institute: Operating Room nurses recognized as CNOR Strong by CCI
- Patient Safety Excellence Award 2020
- Healthgrades Women’s Care Excellence Award 2018
- Hospitals & Health Networks: Most Wired Hospital for using information technology to connect with patients, 2015 - 2020
- Human Rights Campaign Foundation: Leader in LGBTQ Health Care Equality, 2018 - 2022
- Intersocietal Accreditation Commission: Echocardiography facility (Cardiac Non-Invasive, Adult Transesophageal, Adult * Transthoracic, Adult Stress); Vascular Testing facility (Extracranial Cerebrovascular, Peripheral Artery, Peripheral Venous, Visceral Vascular)
- Joint Commission: Gold Seal of Approval for Hospital Accreditation; Survey for Disease Specific Recertification: Acute Coronary Syndrome, Congestive Heart Failure, Stroke, Ventricular Assist Device
- Leapfrog Group: Top Teaching Hospital
- Leapfrog Group: “A” Grade for Safety and Quality, Fall 2018, Spring 2019, Fall 2019, Spring 2020, Fall 2020
- Metabolic and Bariatric Surgery Accreditation and Quality Improvement Program (MBSAQIP) 2022
- Modern Health Care: Best Places to Work, 2018
- Newsweek Magazine: Named a Best Maternity Care Hospital, 2019, 2020
- Newsweek Magazine: Recognized as a World’s Best Hospital, 2019-2023
- New Jersey Department of Health and Senior Services: Designated Primary Stroke Center
- New Jersey Hospital Association HRET Award: The Beth Garden, 2012; Health Care Professional of the Year Award, 2012-2013 and 2016-2017
- NICHE (Nurses Improving Care for Healthsystem Elders): Exemplar Hospital designation for commitment to elder care excellence, 2015-2020
- Achieved Level 8 Most Wired recognition from CHIME in 2023
- NJBIZ: 2020 Top 50 Hospitals list; Physician of the Year Health Care Hero, 2015; Education Hero, 2017; ICON Award, 2019
- U.S. Department of Health and Human Services’ HRSA Workplace Partnership for Life: Platinum Recognition for raising organ and tissue donation awareness, 2016 - 2020
- U.S. News & World Report: RWJBarnabas Health children’s hospitals were named among the nation’s Best Children’s Hospitals for 2023 – 2024 by U.S. News & World Report for Urology. The Urology ranking recognizes a four-hospital practice that is based at The Bristol-Myers Squibb Children's Hospital but that also provides care at three other RWJBarnabas Health hospitals – with Children’s Hospital of New Jersey at Newark Beth Israel Medical Center, McMullen Children’s Center at Cooperman Barnabas Medical Center, and The Unterberg Children’s Hospital at Monmouth Medical Center.
- U.S. News & World Report: Rated High Performing for treatment of Chronic Obstructive Pulmonary Disease and Heart Failure 2016; Cardiology and Heart Surgery 2020; Pulmonology and Lung Surgery 2020
- Washington Monthly Magazine Top 50 Best Major Teaching Hospital in U.S.

== Controversies ==
In 2019 regulators found incidents in which the hospital put patients in "immediate jeopardy" following unsuccessful surgeries, and did not carry out its own recommendations, leading to mistakes on subsequent operations. Regulators also discovered instances hospital staff who failed to obtain informed consent or follow patients' and family members' "do not resuscitate" orders. Weeks later, Congressman Donald M. Payne, Jr. issued a statement about the corrective actions taken by the hospital, saying, "Based on my communications with the hospital, I believe the situation is moving in the right direction at this time and I will continue to monitor it."

In early 2020, the hospital suspended a staff member for distributing unauthorized protective gear after the staff member used GoFundMe to raise money to buy gowns and masks for hospital staff to use in dealing with Coronavirus disease 2019 patients.

== See also ==
- RWJBarnabas Health
- New Jersey Medical School
