= Monmouth Medical Center =

Coordinates: 40°17′44.66″N 73°59′8.40″W

Geography
- Location: New Jersey, U.S.

Organisation
- Type: Regional Medical Center, Private (not-for-profit)

Services
- Beds: 513

Links
- Website: https://www.rwjbh.org/monmouth-medical-center

Monmouth Medical Center, based in Long Branch, New Jersey, is one of New Jersey's largest community academic medical centers. It is an academic affiliate of Robert Wood Johnson Medical School of Rutgers University and is a part of the larger RWJBarnabas Health system. Connected to MMC is the Unterberg Children's Hospital which serves the pediatric population aged 0–21 of Monmouth County.

== History ==
Monmouth Medical Center is a not-for-profit, 527-bed, regional tertiary care teaching hospital located in Long Branch, New Jersey. Monmouth's service area includes a population of nearly 1 million year-round residents in Monmouth, and portions of Ocean and Middlesex counties, as well as a large population of tourists. Admissions total more than 19,000 annually, and emergency visits total nearly 43,000 a year. Annual outpatient clinic visits top 126,000.

On October 23rd 2025, it was announced by the parent company RWJBarnabasHealth that the Maternity Unit and the Pediatric Unit and certain medical and surgical services would be relocated outside of Long Branch. The destination is the Vogel Medical Campus in nearby Tinton Falls, New Jersey. Certain Long Branch residents viewed the changes at the hospital as an unnecessary shutdown. A notable example is US Congressman Frank Pallone. The corporate website for the hospital stated their justification was that according to their own statistics, 86% of patients resided outside of Long Branch, and so they needed to make their services more accessible.

== Accreditation and awards ==
Monmouth Medical Center is accredited with commendation by the Joint Commission on Accreditation of Healthcare Organizations(JCAHO) and is a member of the Council of Teaching Hospitals of the Association of American Medical Colleges. The dental medicine residency is accredited by the American Dental Association. All other residencies are accredited by the Accreditation Council on Graduate Medical Education (ACGME).

The hospital was recently recognized as a Distinguished Academic Medical Center among an elite group of the nation's nine leading teaching hospitals by Press Ganey. Additionally, Monmouth Medical Center had recently earned a ranking on Solucient 100 Top Hospitals – Performance Improvement Leaders award, recognizing Monmouth Medical Center for its clinical outcomes and patient safety. In 2006, the Department of Radiology received recognition in the publication Medical Imaging as a runner-up for "Best Freestanding Imaging Center or Group".

== Unterberg Children's Hospital ==
Unterberg Children's Hospital

The Unterberg Children's Hospital at Monmouth Medical Center is a pediatric acute care hospital. The hospital has 70 beds. It is affiliated with Rutgers University Robert Wood Johnson Medical School and is a member of RWJBarnabas Health. The hospital provides comprehensive pediatric specialties and subspecialties to pediatric patients aged 0–21 throughout Coastal New Jersey.

== Southern Campus ==
In 2014, Monmouth Medical Center (in Long Branch) merged with Kimball Medical Center (in Lakewood), renaming it Monmouth Medical Center Southern Campus.

== Vogel Medical Campus ==
Ground was broken in June 2023 for the Vogel Medical Campus at Tinton Falls, a five-story, 150,000-square-foot center that's expected to open in 2025.

== Education ==
In 1945, Monmouth established its first residency program – in orthopedics – to meet the needs of physicians returning from World War II trained in treating battlefield trauma.

Half of the residents enter practice after graduation, while the others enter competitive fellowships in the United States. Today Monmouth has 110 residents in nine accredited residency programs.

=== Monmouth University Medical Scholars ===
This program allows incoming freshmen of Monmouth University to enroll in a track directly tailored toward medical school. Students are pre-selected, enter a rigorous pre-medical, undergraduate course of study and are guided by special advisors and preceptors at Monmouth Medical Center. If successfully completing the program with desired GPA and MCAT scores, they are ensured acceptance at Drexel University College of Medicine.

== List of residency programs at the hospital ==
- Dental medicine residency
- Diagnostic radiology residency
- General surgery residency
- Internal medicine residency
- Obstetrics and gynecology residency
- Orthopedic surgery residency
- Pathology residency
- Pediatric medicine residency
- Podiatric medicine residency
- Pharmacy residency

== The campus ==
Monmouth Medical Center covers 21 acres (85,000 m^{2}) in Long Branch. The hospital's main building comprises 16 wings that occupy a total of 735,000 square feet (68,300 m^{2}), in addition to 16 other buildings totaling 185,100 square feet (17,200 m^{2}). These include apartments for resident physicians, a privately operated day care center, a Ronald McDonald House, and professional and educational buildings.

=== The Altschul Medical Library ===
Located within the hospital, this collection serves as the major information resource for the faculty, student residents, and staff of Monmouth Medical Center.

The library houses 4000 monographs, 7000 reels of microfilm, 2000 bound volumes, and subscriptions to 300 journals.

The Library is a member of the Central Jersey Regional Library Cooperative and National Network of Libraries of Medicine. It participates in the National Library of Medicine Docline and has interlibrary loan arrangements with more than 100 hospitals and universities throughout New Jersey.

== Monmouth Medical Center Foundation ==
This organization, started in 1982, is a volunteer group that fundraises through various functions to help provide charitable care to the community it serves.
