= RWJBarnabas Health =

Network of independent healthcare providers in New Jersey, USA

- RWJ Barnabas Health Inc.
- Formation: March 30, 2016; 10 years ago
- Merger of: Saint Barnabas Health Network, Robert Wood Johnson Health Network
- Purpose: 501(c)(3) health system
- Headquarters: West Orange, New Jersey, United States (operations); New Brunswick, New Jersey (academic)
- Region served: New Jersey
- Services: Healthcare
- Chief executive officer: Mark E. Manigan
- Key people: Lester J. Owens - Chair; Wilfredo Caraballo - Trustee
- Revenue: ▲US$6.409 billion (2022)
- Expenses: ▼US$6.614 billion (2022)
- Staff: 40,511 employees; 1,478 volunteers (2022)
- Website: www.rwjbh.org

RWJBarnabas Health is a network of independent healthcare providers in New Jersey, based out of West Orange. Members include academic centers, acute care facilities, and research hospitals. The goals of the network include collaboration on educational and research programs.

RWJBarnabas Health was created through the 2016 merger of the Robert Wood Johnson Health System and the Saint Barnabas Health Care System.

As of 2022, RWJBarnabas employs over 40,000 individuals, with 1,000 resident and interns and approximately 1,500 volunteers across the entire health network and its subordinates.

== History ==
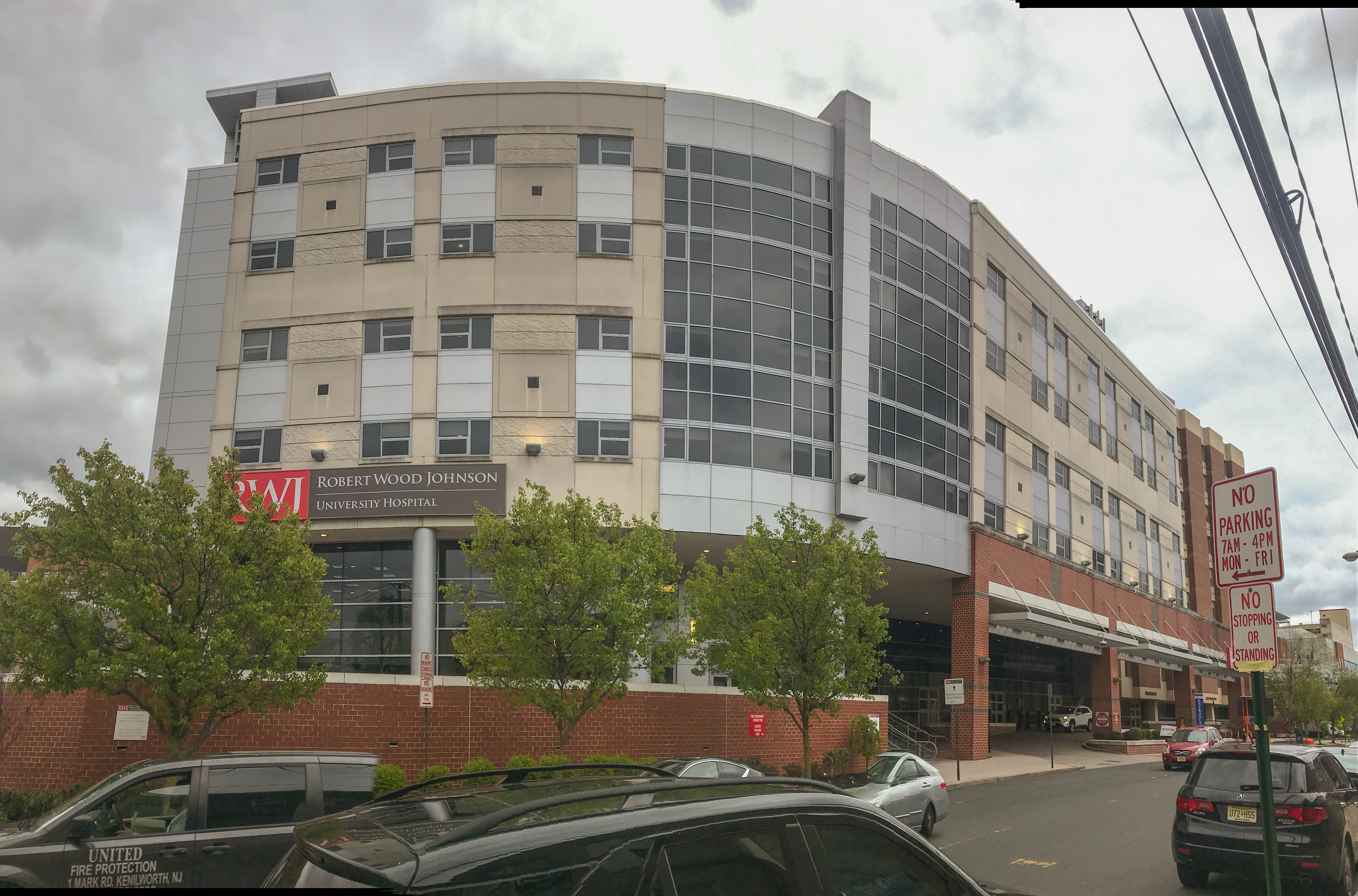
A panorama of the Robert Wood Johnson University Hospital.

In July 2015, Saint Barnabas Health Care System, headquartered in West Orange, New Jersey, and Robert Wood Johnson Health System, headquartered out of New Brunswick, New Jersey, signed an agreement outlining a merger between the two health systems. The Federal Trade Commission, as well as the New Jersey Attorney General, needed to review the deal before it was official, with the expectation that the merger would be approved and completed in the following year.

On March 30, 2016, the two health systems officially merged and formed RWJBarnabas Health. The transaction created New Jersey's largest health care system and the largest private employer in the state.

After the merger, Barry Ostrowsky, CEO of Saint Barnabas, took over as president & CEO of the new health system, while Stephen Jones, CEO of Robert Wood Johnson Health, was named Chief Academic Officer. Company leadership also announced that a formal headquarters would not be named, rather the business operations would be run out of the West Orange offices while the academic operations would continue out of the New Brunswick location.

In January 2023, Mark Manigan replaced Barry Ostrowsky as president & CEO of the health system.

== Acquisitions ==
=== Trinitas Regional acquisition ===
In October 2019, the leaders of RWJBarnabas Health signed a letter of intent to acquire the Trinitas Regional Medical Center in Elizabeth, New Jersey, itself established by the consolidation of St. Elizabeth Hospital and Elizabeth General Medical Center. The preliminary letter of intent was a nonbinding agreement that laid out a basic structure for the proposed acquisition of the hospital and the nearby long-term care center. Trinitas would still retain its core Catholic ideologies upon the acquisition and continue to maintain its affiliation with the Sisters of Charity of Saint Elizabeth.

On November 12, 2020, it was announced that the health systems had signed a definitive agreement that the two systems would merge. The Trinitas board of directors would still oversee day-to-day operations.

On January 6, 2022, Trinitas and its facilities officially became part of the health system.

=== Saint Peter's acquisition ===
In late 2019, it was announced that the leaders of RWJBarnabas Health and the leaders of Saint Peter's Healthcare System signed a letter of intent to explore a merger. The preliminary plan calls for significant investments in Saint Peter's by RWJBarnabas Health to help expand the outpatient services currently provided by Saint Peter's. Saint Peter's would remain a Catholic hospital and continue its sponsorship by the Roman Catholic Diocese of Metuchen. According to administrations from both hospitals, the two parties had been in discussions for a while and believe they could both benefit from the merger. The merger would also strengthen education services provided at the two Rutgers-affiliated hospitals.

On September 10, 2020, it was announced that the health systems signed a definitive agreement to merge. The merger would create the largest academic medical center in the state. After signing the agreement, the potential partnership began a period of review by state and federal regulatory agencies.

The Federal Trade Commission announced the filings of an official complaint and lawsuit to block the merger on June 2, 2022, claiming the merger would violate section 7 of the Clayton Act. FTC Bureau of Competition Director Holly Vedova stated in a June 2022 press release, "Saint Peter's University Hospital is less than one mile away from RWJ in New Brunswick, and they are the only two hospitals in that city... There is overwhelming evidence that this acquisition would be bad for patients, because the parties would no longer have to compete to provide the lowest prices and the best quality and service." The agency alleged further that the merger would give the combined health systems approximately 50% of the market share in acute care within Middlesex County.

On June 14, 2022, both RWJBH and Saint Peter's announced that the agreement was terminated.

=== Rutgers partnership ===
In August 2018, a partnership was announced with Rutgers University, making RWJBarnabas the largest academic health system in New Jersey. The announcement was made public by Jonathan Holloway, President of Rutgers, and Barry Ostrowsky, then-President & CEO of the health system.

In February 2021, it was further announced that the two entities would begin an Integrated Practice Agreement (IPA) between Rutgers' Robert Wood Johnson Medical School and the RWJBarnabas group practices.

== Hospitals in the system ==
At the time of formation, RWJBarnabas comprised eleven acute care hospitals, three acute care children's hospitals, and a pediatric rehab facility. Since then, the health system has added two additional hospitals (Trinitas) and three medical schools: Rutgers New Jersey Medical School (Newark), Rutgers Robert Wood Johnson Medical School (New Brunswick), and Trinitas School of Nursing Union College (Elizabeth).

Hospital	City (in NJ)	Beds	Type	Former Network	Notes
Bristol-Myers Squibb Children's Hospital	New Brunswick	105	Children's hospital	Robert Wood Johnson Health System	
Children's Hospital of New Jersey at Newark Beth Israel Medical Center	Newark	69	Children's hospital	Saint Barnabas Health Care System	
Children's Specialized Hospital	New Brunswick	100	Children's hospital; Rehabilitation center	Robert Wood Johnson Health System	Several outpatient facilities exist throughout the state
Clara Maass Medical Center	Belleville	342	Acute care	Saint Barnabas Health Care System	
Community Medical Center	Toms River	449	Acute care	Saint Barnabas Health Care System	
Cooperman Barnabas Medical Center	Livingston	597	Acute care; Teaching hospital	Saint Barnabas Health Care System	Flagship
Jersey City Medical Center	Jersey City	308	Acute care	Saint Barnabas Health Care System	
Monmouth Medical Center	Long Branch	513	Acute care	Saint Barnabas Health Care System	
Monmouth Medical Center - Southern Campus	Lakewood	201	Acute care	Saint Barnabas Health Care System	
Newark Beth Israel Medical Center	Newark	665	Acute care	Saint Barnabas Health Care System	
Robert Wood Johnson University Hospital (RWJUH)	New Brunswick	620	Acute care; Teaching hospital	Robert Wood Johnson Health System	Flagship; Academic HQ
RWJUH-Hamilton	Hamilton	152	Acute care	Robert Wood Johnson Health System	
RWJUH-Rahway	Rahway	139	Acute care	Robert Wood Johnson Health System	
RWJUH-Somerset	Somerville	347	Acute care	Robert Wood Johnson Health System	
Unterberg Children's Hospital	Long Branch	70	Children's hospital	Saint Barnabas Health Care System	
Trinitas Regional Medical Center	Elizabeth	442	Acute care; Teaching hospital	Independent	
Trinitas Regional Medical Center - New Point Campus	Elizabeth	112	Behavioral health; Extended care & rehabilitation center	Independent	

== See also ==
- Hackensack Meridian Health
- Atlantic Health System
- The Bristol-Myers Squibb Children's Hospital
