= Oyster Point Hotel =

Coordinates: 40.354802°N 74.074609°W

The Oyster Point Hotel is a 58-room hotel located on the Navesink River in Red Bank, New Jersey. The hotel was previously owned by Kevork Hovnanian and is currently owned by Barry Hospitality.

The Oyster Point Hotel (or simply "Oyster Point") opened in 1986 and was renovated in 2009. The hotel has dining and lounging amenities, both popular among tourists visiting Red Bank. The Pearl Lounge is Oyster Point's large elegant bar. It is located near the historic Molly Pitcher Inn, which is considered as Oyster Point's "sister hotel".
