= Rich Mosca =

American football player and coach

Biographical details
- Born: c. 1948

Playing career
- 1967–1968: Concord
- 1969: West Liberty State

Coaching career (HC unless noted)
- 1970–1975: Keyport HS (NJ)
- 1976–1984: Middletown South HS (NJ)
- 1985–1989: Fairleigh Dickinson–Florham (OC)
- 1990: Monmouth Regional HS (NJ) (DC)
- 1991–1995: Monmouth Regional HS (NJ)
- 1996: Monmouth (TE)
- 1997–1999: Monmouth (RB)
- 2000–2001: Fairleigh Dickinson–Florham (OC)
- 2002–2010: Fairleigh Dickinson–Florham
- 2011–2012: Monmouth Regional HS (NJ) (DC)
- 2013–2017: Monmouth Regional HS (NJ)
- 2018: Neptune HS (NJ) (asst. HC / OC)
- 2019-2021: Rumson-Fair Haven HS (NJ)
- 2022-present: Monmouth Regional HS (NJ)

Head coaching record
- Overall: 23–67 (college)

Rich Mosca (born c. 1948) is an American former football player, teacher and coach. He served as the head football coach at Fairleigh Dickinson–Florham (FDU) in Florham Park, New Jersey from 2002 to 2010, compiling a record of 23–67.

== Early life and playing career ==
Mosca attended Red Bank High School in Red Bank, New Jersey, where he played high school football as a tackle. Mosca also served in the United States Army Reserve from 1970 to 1976.

== Head coaching record ==
=== College ===
Year	Team	Overall	Conference	Standing	Bowl/playoffs
Fairleigh Dickinson–Florham Devils (Middle Atlantic Conference) (2002–2010)
2002	Fairleigh Dickinson–Florham	2–8	2–7	T–8th	
2003	Fairleigh Dickinson–Florham	1–9	0–9	11th	
2004	Fairleigh Dickinson–Florham	4–6	3–6	T–7th	
2005	Fairleigh Dickinson–Florham	4–6	4–5	7th	
2006	Fairleigh Dickinson–Florham	2–8	2–7	T–8th	
2007	Fairleigh Dickinson–Florham	2–8	0–7	8th	
2008	Fairleigh Dickinson–Florham	3–7	1–6	8th	
2009	Fairleigh Dickinson–Florham	2–8	1–6	T–7th	
2010	Fairleigh Dickinson–Florham	3–7	0–7	8th	
Fairleigh Dickinson–Florham:		23–67	13–60		
Total:		23–67			
