= Katharine Elkus White =

American politician and diplomat

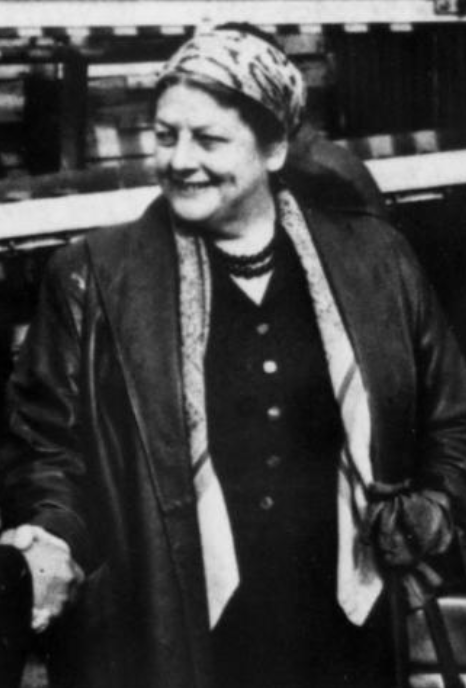
- Katharine Elkus White, from a 1964 publication of the US Department of State

United States Ambassador to Denmark
- In office June 2, 1964 – September 9, 1968
- President: Lyndon B. Johnson
- Preceded by: William McCormick Blair Jr.
- Succeeded by: Angier Biddle Duke

Treasurer of New Jersey
- Acting; 1961
- Governor: Robert B. Meyner
- Preceded by: John Kervick
- Succeeded by: John Kervick

Chair of New Jersey Turnpike Authority
- In office 1955–1964
- Governor: Robert B. Meyner; Richard J. Hughes

Mayor of Red Bank, New Jersey
- In office January 1, 1951 – January 1, 1957
- Preceded by: Charles English

Personal details
- Born: November 25, 1906
- Died: April 24, 1985 (aged 78)
- Party: Democratic
- Parent: Abram Isaac Elkus
- Occupation: Politician; diplomat

Katharine Elkus White (November 25, 1906 – April 24, 1985) was an American Democratic Party politician and diplomat, who served as Mayor of Red Bank, New Jersey from 1951 to 1956, chairwoman of the New Jersey Highway Authority (1955-1964), and United States Ambassador to Denmark (1964-1968).

== Early life ==
White was born in 1906, the daughter of Abram Isaac Elkus and Gertrude Rosalie Hess. Her father was appointed by Woodrow Wilson to be the United States Ambassador to the Ottoman Empire. She lived in Constantinople while her father was ambassador there from 1916 to 1919. The family later settled in Red Bank, New Jersey.

She graduated from Vassar College in 1928, and on October 3, 1929 married Arthur J. White, a stockbroker who later became the executive secretary of the New York Clothing Manufacturers Exchange. They raised two children in Red Bank (Lawrence Elkus White, b. 1931, and Frances Elkus White, b. 1933).

== Political career ==
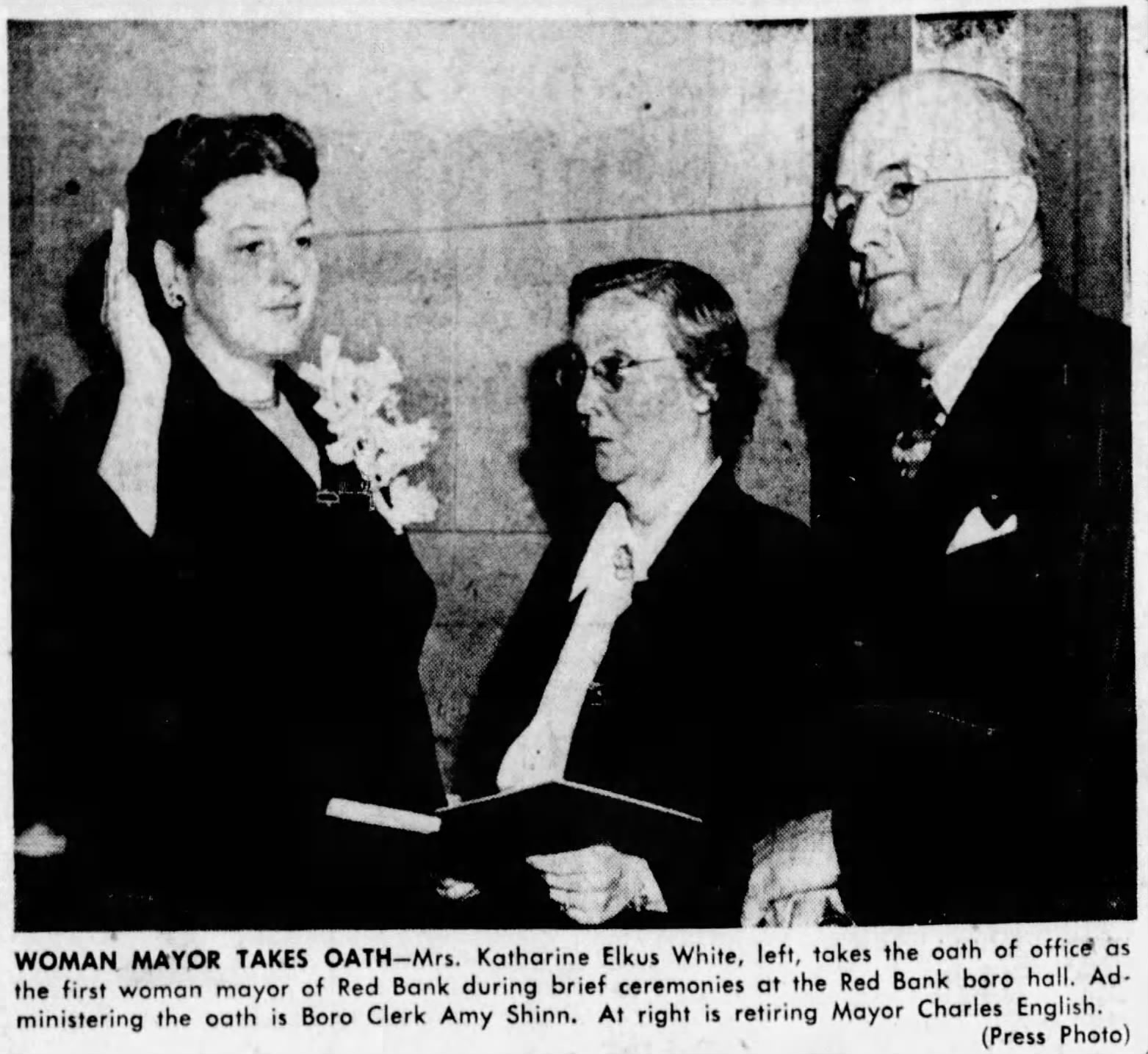
White is sworn in as the first female Mayor of Red Bank, 1951

White became involved in local Democratic politics and unsuccessfully ran for Red Bank Borough Council in 1933, losing by thirteen votes. She also ran unsuccessfully as a Democratic candidate from Monmouth County for the State Assembly in 1934, and for Monmouth County Board of Freeholders in 1935.

She was a delegate to the Democratic National Convention in 1936, 1940, 1944, and 1948. In 1940 she became a member of the New Jersey Democratic State Committee and would later serve as vice-chair in 1954.

In 1950 she ran for Mayor of Red Bank, as the Democratic candidate in a predominantly Republican town. She defeated her Republican opponent, Stanley O. Wilkins, and was sworn in on January 1, 1951 as Red Bank's first female mayor and the first Democrat to serve in more than twenty years. She was re-elected twice, remaining Mayor until 1956.

In 1954, Governor Robert B. Meyner appointed her a commissioner of the New Jersey Highway Authority, which operated the Garden State Parkway. In 1955 she became chairman of the Highway Authority, a position she held for ten years. She was the first woman in the United States to head a toll road body.

In 1960 she ran for the 3rd congressional district in the House of Representatives, in an unsuccessful bid to unseat incumbent James C. Auchincloss. In 1961 she was named acting New Jersey State Treasurer.

== Diplomatic career and later life ==
On March 4, 1964, at a Women's National Press Club dinner, President Lyndon Johnson announced White's appointment as United States Ambassador to Denmark. At the same time Johnson also named nine other women to federal posts, pledging an end to "stag Government."

White served as Ambassador until 1968. After her retirement, she returned to Red Bank, where she worked with local and national organizations, including the United Negro College Fund. She also served on the Board of Governors of Rutgers University from 1976 to 1980.

White died at the Riverview Medical Center in Red Bank at the age of 78.

Diplomatic posts
Preceded by William McCormick Blair, Jr.	U.S. Ambassador to Denmark; 1964–1968	Succeeded by Angier Biddle Duke
