= Oyster Point =

Oyster Point may refer to:

in Australia:

- Oyster Point (Australia), an area near Cardwell

in the United States:

- Oyster Point Marina/Park, an area in South San Francisco, California
- Oyster Point, the peninsula upon which downtown Charleston, South Carolina, is located
- City Point (New Haven), a neighborhood also known as Oyster Point in New Haven, Connecticut
  - Oyster Point Historic District, a historic district in City Point neighborhood of New Haven, Connecticut
- Oyster Point, a section of the city of Newport News, Virginia, which includes Oyster Point City Center
- Oyster Point Hotel, a hotel in Red Bank, New Jersey
