= Red Bank Regional High School =

High school in Monmouth County, New Jersey, US

Address
- 101 Ridge Road Little Silver, Monmouth County, New Jersey, 07739; United States

District information
- Grades: 9-12
- Superintendent: Louis B. Moore
- Business administrator: Debra Pappagallo
- Schools: 1

Students and staff
- Enrollment: 1,297 (as of 2023–24)
- Faculty: 124.8 FTEs
- Student–teacher ratio: 10.4:1

Other information
- District Factor Group: FG
- Website: School website
Ind.	Per pupil	District spending	Rank (*)	9-12 average	%± vs. average
1A	Total Spending	$22,931	34	$18,891	21.4%
1	Budgetary Cost	17,116	37	15,592	9.8%
2	Classroom Instruction	9,501	29	8,807	7.9%
6	Support Services	2,915	37	2,294	27.1%
8	Administrative Cost	1,827	36	1,592	14.8%
10	Operations & Maintenance	1,962	24	1,954	0.4%
13	Extracurricular Activities	863	23	873	−1.1%
16	Median Teacher Salary	65,213	18	71,726
Data from NJDoE 2014 Taxpayers' Guide to Education Spending. *Of 9-12 districts with any number of students. Lowest spending=1; Highest=47

Red Bank Regional High School

Location
- 40.350775°N 74.041844°W

Information
- Type: Public
- Established: 1975
- School district: Red Bank Regional High School District
- NCES School ID: 341375004084
- Principal: Nicholas Timpone
- Faculty: 124.8 FTEs
- Grades: 9 - 12
- Enrollment: 1,297 (as of 2023–24)
- Student to teacher ratio: 10.4:1
- Colors: Maroon and Gray
- Athletics conference: Shore Conference
- Team name: Bucs
- Accreditation: Middle States Association of Colleges and Schools

Red Bank Regional High School (often abbreviated RBR) is a comprehensive regional four-year public high school and school district that serves students in ninth through twelfth grades from the boroughs of Little Silver, Red Bank and Shrewsbury, three municipalities in Monmouth County, in the U.S. state of New Jersey. The school has been accredited by the Middle States Association of Colleges and Schools Commission on Elementary and Secondary Schools since 1928. The high school is the only facility of the Red Bank regional High School District.

The school includes a vocational program, which students from anywhere in Monmouth County (who pay tuition, with the exception of in-district students, and students coming from districts where their respective district pays) can attend as a major in one of the many programs, including the Academy of Visual and Performing Arts, the Academy of Information Technology, Academy of Finance, Engineering, and Graphic Communications. The school also offers a freshman academy which reduces the size of the school for incoming freshmen by dividing them among three houses. In spring 2009, RBR was approved by the International Baccalaureate (IB) North American Division as an IB school and began offering the IB program to juniors and seniors in the fall of 2009. In fall 2009, RBR launched its three-year academies for sophomores, juniors and seniors in the areas of Math & Science, Humanities & Social Studies, International & Cultural Studies, and Sports Medicine & Management.

As of the 2023–24 school year, the school had an enrollment of 1,297 students and 124.8 classroom teachers (on an FTE basis), for a student–teacher ratio of 10.4:1. There were 344 students (26.5% of enrollment) eligible for free lunch and 84 (6.5% of students) eligible for reduced-cost lunch.

The district had been classified by the New Jersey Department of Education as being in District Factor Group "FG", the fourth-highest of eight groupings. District Factor Groups organize districts statewide to allow comparison by common socioeconomic characteristics of the local districts. From lowest socioeconomic status to highest, the categories are A, B, CD, DE, FG, GH, I and J.

Red Bank Regional High School is overseen by the New Jersey Department of Education and is a member of the National Consortium for Specialized Secondary Schools of Mathematics, Science and Technology and the National Academy Foundation.

== History ==
The original Red Bank High School was opened in 1901.

Prior to the establishment of the regional district, students from Holmdel Township, Little Silver and Shrewsbury had attended Red Bank High School as part of a sending/receiving relationship. The Holmdel Township Public Schools switched from Keyport High School and started sending students to Red Bank in 1962, which ended when the district opened Holmdel High School in September 1973.

The school district was established in 1969 and used space rented from the Red Bank Borough Public Schools until construction of the new high school building was completed in 1975. This building, at 101 Ridge Road in Little Silver, was constructed on the site of the former Lovett Nursery. The new school replaced one that had opened in 1917, at 101 Harding Road in Red Bank, one mile away on the same road, that now serves as Red Bank Middle School.

== Awards, recognition and rankings ==
In the 2011 "Ranking America's High Schools" issue by The Washington Post, the school was ranked 45th in New Jersey and 1,394th nationwide. RBR was named to Newsweek's list of top high schools in the country in its June 2010 article "America's Best High Schools 2010", ranked number 1,557 in the country.

The school was the 88th-ranked public high school in New Jersey out of 339 schools statewide in New Jersey Monthly magazine's September 2014 cover story on the state's "Top Public High Schools", using a new ranking methodology. The school had been ranked 41st in the state of 328 schools in 2012, after being ranked 61st in 2010 out of 322 schools listed. The magazine ranked the school 64th in 2008 out of 316 schools. The school was ranked 84th in the magazine's September 2006 issue, which included 316 schools across the state. Schooldigger.com ranked the school 135th out of 381 public high schools statewide in its 2011 rankings (an increase of 33 positions from the 2010 ranking) which were based on the combined percentage of students classified as proficient or above proficient on the mathematics (84.9%) and language arts literacy (94.1%) components of the High School Proficiency Assessment.

== Curriculum ==
Red Bank Regional High School offers full year and semester courses. A wide variety of courses are offered to serve the needs and interests of the student body, including the AVID college preparatory program and many Honors, Advanced Placement, and International Baccalaureate courses. Successful completion of required courses for graduation, passing scores on the New Jersey High School Proficiency Assessment, and a total of at least 140 credits are necessary to qualify for graduation.

Students may specialize in one of five four-year Career and Technical Education programs: the Academy of Visual and Performing Arts, Academy of Information Technology, Academy of Engineering, Academy of Finance, or Academy of Early Childhood Education, or concentrate their studies in one of four three-year small learning communities in Math & Science, Humanities & Social Studies, International & Cultural Studies and Sports Medicine & Management.

Visual and Performing Arts majors specialize in one of nine programs: Media Production, Creative Writing, Dance, Drama, Vocal Music, Piano, Instrumental Music (Strings, Woodwinds, or Brass), Commercial Art or Commercial Photography. These majors typically include multiple classes per day and participation in certain extracurricular events and activities as part of the requirements.

World Language students may choose Spanish, French, or Italian. The Italian program was introduced in the 2012–2013 school year. Many students, especially those in the Humanities and Social Studies and International and Cultural Studies academies, enroll in more than one language.

== Athletics ==
The Red Bank Regional High School Bucs compete in Division B North of the Shore Conference, an athletic conference comprised of public and private high schools in Monmouth and Ocean counties along the Jersey Shore. The league operates under the jurisdiction of the New Jersey State Interscholastic Athletic Association (NJSIAA). With 891 students in grades 10-12, the school was classified by the NJSIAA for the 2019–20 school year as Group III for most athletic competition purposes, which included schools with an enrollment of 761 to 1,058 students in that grade range. The school was classified by the NJSIAA as Group IV South for football for 2024–2026, which included schools with 890 to 1,298 students.

The 1975 football team finished the season with an 11–0 record after winning the Central Jersey Group II state sectional championship with a 46–44 victory against Hightstown High School in the tournament final to extend the team's winning streak to 28 games.

The boys' basketball team won the Group II state championship in 1983 against Elmwood Park Memorial High School and won the Group III title in 1993 with a win over Henry Snyder High School in the tournament final. The 1993 team won the Group III title by defeating Snyder High School by a score of 62–55 in the championship game played at the Rutgers Athletic Center. The team advanced to the Tournament of Champions, becoming the first team from the Shore Conference to do so, and lost to Seton Hall Preparatory School in the quarterfinals by a score of 60–59 to finish the season with a record of 28-2.

The field hockey team won the Central Jersey Group III state title in 1988, 1991, 1995 and 2000; the team won the Group III state championship in 1995.

The girls' basketball team won the Group III state title in 1998 with a 62–47 win against Sparta High School in the championship game played at the Thomas Dunn Sports Center in Elizabeth.

The boys' cross country team won the Group III state championship in 1999 and 2003.

Both the boys' and girls' track teams won the Group II indoor relay state championships in 2000.

== Administration ==
Core members of the school's administration are:

- Louis B. Moore, superintendent
- Debra Pappagallo, school business administrator
- Nicholas Timpone, principal

== Board of education ==
The district's board of education, comprised of nine members, sets policy and oversees the fiscal and educational operation of the district through its administration. As a Type II school district, the board's trustees are elected directly by voters to serve three-year terms of office on a staggered basis, with three seats up for election each year held (since 2012) as part of the November general election. The board appoints a superintendent to oversee the district's day-to-day operations and a business administrator to supervise the business functions of the district. Seats on the board of education are allocated based on the population of the constituent municipalities, with five seats allocated to Red Bank and two each to Little Silver and Shrewsbury.

== Notable alumni ==
Alumni of Red Bank Regional High School (and its predecessor Red Bank High School) include:

- Clyde Bishop (born 1942), United States Ambassador to the Marshall Islands from 2006 to 2009
- Frances Blaisdell (1912-2009), award-winning, pioneering flutist and educator
- Dave Bry (1970-2017), writer, music journalist and editor at Vibe, Spin and XXL
- Asia Carrera (born 1973), former pornographic actress
- William J. Chiego (born 1943, class of 1961), museum curator, who has been director of the McNay Art Museum in San Antonio since 1991
- John D'Amico Jr. (born 1941), who served on the Monmouth County Board of Chosen Freeholders and served in the New Jersey Senate in 1988 and 1989
- Kimberly Eulner (born 1966), politician who is the Mayor of Shrewsbury Borough and represented the 11th Legislative district in the New Jersey General Assembly from 2022 to 2024
- Brian Gaskill (born 1970), actor best known for his role as Rafe in the now-defunct General Hospital spin-off, Port Charles
- Joe Jacques (born 1995), pitcher who has played for the Boston Red Sox and Arizona Diamondbacks
- Eddie Jones (1929–1997; class of 1946), jazz double bassist who performed with Count Basie and his orchestra
- Jake Kalish (born 1991, class of 2010), professional baseball pitcher
- John Lee (born 1953), former American football defensive end who played in the National Football League for the San Diego Chargers and New England Patriots
- Jonathan Maslow (1948-2008), author who wrote extensively about nature, with a focus on obscure and little-understood animals
- Leo Massa (1929-2009), cross-country skier who competed in the men's 30 kilometre event at the 1960 Winter Olympics
- Eric McCoo (born 1980), running back who played for the Philadelphia Eagles
- Greg Montgomery (1964-2020) former National Football League punter from 1988-1997, who played for the Houston Oilers, Detroit Lions and Baltimore Ravens
- Rich Mosca (born c. 1948), former American football player and coach who served as the head football coach at Fairleigh Dickinson–Florham from 2002 to 2010
- Elizabeth Clare Prophet (1939-2009), former spiritual author
- Melanie Safka (1947–2024, class of 1966), singer-songwriter
- Garrett Sickels (born 1994), outside linebacker for the Los Angeles Rams of the NFL
- Danny Stubbs (born 1965), former football defensive lineman
- Casey Webb, television host and professional eater, best known as the host of the television series Man v. Food
- Kade Weston (born 1986), football defensive lineman for the New England Patriots
