= Mayor of Red Bank, New Jersey =

Political office in the United States

Red Bank, New Jersey is governed under the borough form of New Jersey municipal government. The governing body consists of a mayor and a borough council comprising six council members, with all positions elected at-large on a partisan basis as part of the November general election. A mayor is elected directly by the voters to a four-year term of office. The borough council consists of six members elected to serve three-year terms on a staggered basis, with two seats coming up for election each year in a three-year cycle. The borough form of government used by Red Bank, the most common system used in the state, is a "weak mayor / strong council" government in which council members act as the legislative body with the mayor presiding at meetings and voting only in the event of a tie. The mayor can veto ordinances subject to an override by a two-thirds majority vote of the council. The mayor makes committee and liaison assignments for council members, and most appointments are made by the mayor with the advice and consent of the council.

== Mayors ==
- Billy Portman (D) 2023–present. Term Expires: June 30, 2027.
- Pasquale Menna (D) 2006–2022.
- Edward J. McKenna, Jr. (D) 1991 to 2006.
- Michael Arnone (R) 1979 to 1990.
- Daniel Joseph O'Hern (D) 1969 to 1978. He also was a former Associate Justice of the New Jersey Supreme Court, where he served from August 6, 1981 until his retirement on his 70th birthday.
- John P. Arnone (R) 1967 to 1968.
- Benedict R. Nicosia (D) 1961 to 1966.
- George A. Gray (R) 1957-1960
- Katharine Elkus White (D) 1951 to 1956. She was a Democratic Party politician and diplomat, who served as chairwoman of the New Jersey Highway Authority from 1955 to 1964. She also served as the United States Ambassador to Denmark from 1964 to 1968.
- Charles R. English, 1931-1950.
- O. E. Davis, c. 1903.
