= Jake Kalish =

American baseball player (born 1991)

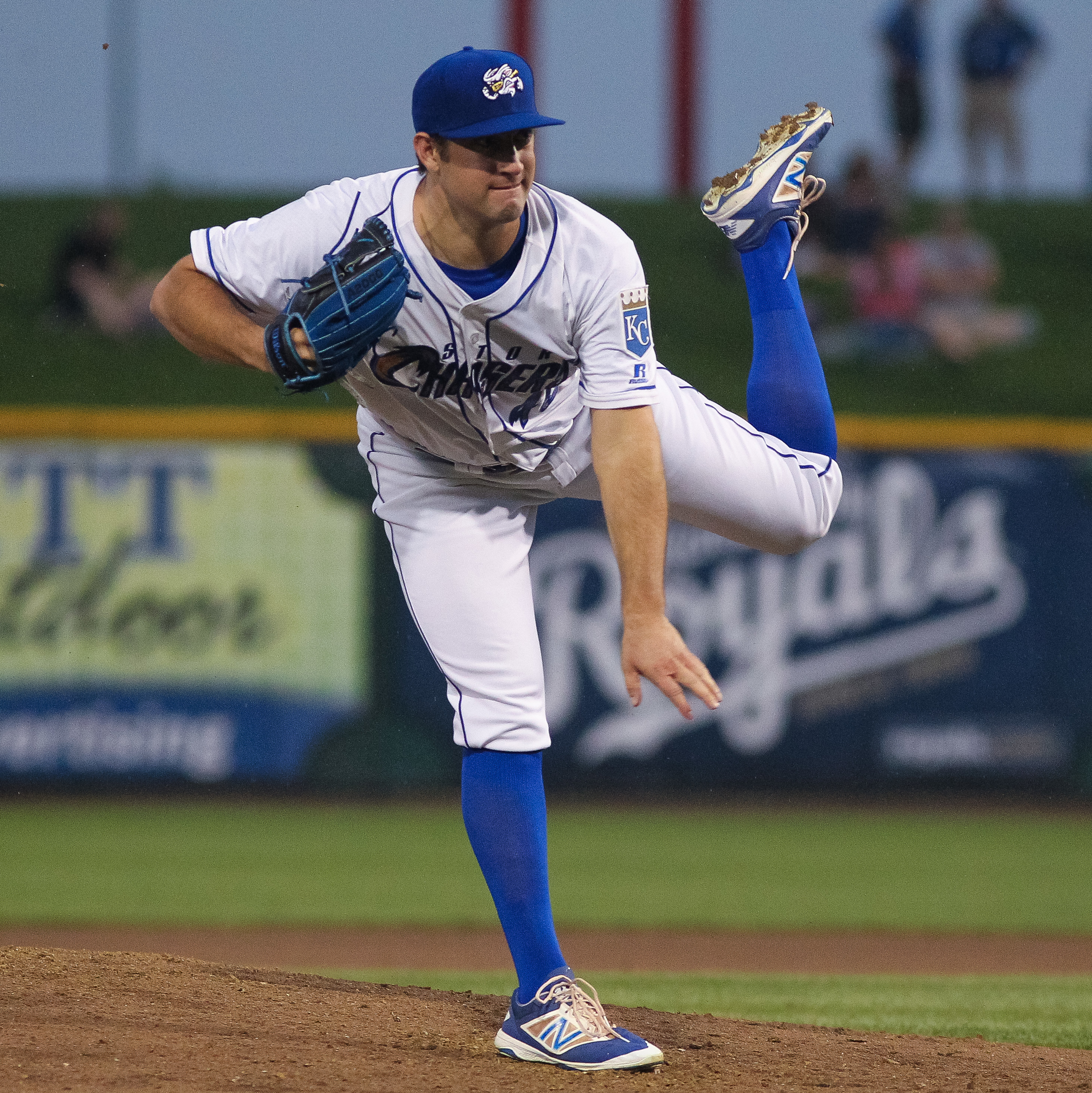
- Kalish with the Omaha Storm Chasers in 2017
- Pitcher
- Born: July 9, 1991 (age 34); Red Bank, New Jersey, U.S.
- Bats: Switch Throws: Left
- Stats at Baseball Reference

Jacob Louis Kalish (born July 9, 1991) is an American former professional baseball pitcher. Kalish was drafted by the Royals in the 32nd round of the 2015 Major League Baseball draft. He played for Team Israel at the 2017 World Baseball Classic and the 2023 World Baseball Classic.

== Early years ==
Kalish was born in Red Bank, New Jersey, to Steve and Eileen Plata Kalish, and is Jewish. His brother Ryan Kalish has played as an outfielder in the major leagues with the Boston Red Sox and Chicago Cubs. He grew up in Shrewsbury, New Jersey. While in middle school, he pitched the Jersey Shore Hurricanes U14-15 team to the 2006 championship of the United States Amateur Baseball League (USABL), a youth league headquartered in Point Pleasant, New Jersey.

Kalish was a pitcher at Red Bank Regional High School in Little Silver, New Jersey, from which he graduated in 2010. He was Division Pitcher of the Year both his junior and senior years. He also played football for the school as a freshman.

== College career ==
He then attended George Mason University, where he played for the Patriots. While at George Mason, Kalish played collegiate summer baseball for the Brewster Whitecaps of the Cape Cod Baseball League in 2012, and returned to the league in 2014 to play for the Wareham Gatemen. As a switch-hitter for George Mason, Kalish batted .301 in 39 games as a senior in 2015, and started 13 games in which he had a 3.44 ERA and 77 strikeouts (2nd in the Atlantic-10 Conference) in 83 2/3 innings.

== Professional career ==
=== Kansas City Royals ===
Kalish was selected by the Kansas City Royals in the 32nd round (969th overall) of the 2015 Major League Baseball draft.

In his first professional season, Kalish pitched for the Arizona League Royals of the Rookie Arizona League and the rookie-level Burlington Royals of the Rookie Advanced Appalachian League, going a combined 3–3 with a 2.67 ERA, as he kept batters to a .202 batting average. In 2016, Kalish pitched for the Single-A Lexington Legends of the South Atlantic League and the High-A Wilmington Blue Rocks of the Carolina League, going a combined 3–0 with a 2.45 ERA in 23 relief appearances, as he kept batters to a .192 batting average and averaged 9.1 strikeouts/9 innings and 2.1 walks/9 innings. That season he was an MILB.com Kansas City Organization All Star, and named the organization's best relief pitcher. For the 2017 season, Kalish pitched for the Wilmington Blue Rocks again, going 1–1 with one save with a 1.93 ERA in 10 relief appearances while striking out 23 in 18.2 innings, and for the Double-A Northwest Arkansas Naturals of the Texas League, going 0–7 with a 3.77 ERA in 18 games (9 of them starts). In August 2017, pitching for the Omaha Storm Chasers of the Pacific Coast League Kalish made his second-ever start in Triple-A, against three-time Cy Young Award winner and former MVP Clayton Kershaw, who was in the minors for a rehab start. Kalish outdueled Kershaw with eight strikeouts and two walks in seven shutout innings. In three starts for Omaha, he was 1–0 with a 2.35 ERA, striking out 16 in 15.1 innings.

Kalish started the 2018 season pitching again for the Northwest Arkansas Naturals of the Texas League, for whom he was 2–2 with a 5.12 ERA and 39 strikeouts and 8 walks in 38.2 innings, and then pitched for the Omaha Storm Chasers of the Pacific Coast League, where he was 6–6 with a 3.34 ERA and 85 strikeouts and 13 walks in 89 innings. His 124 strikeouts between the two teams led all Kansas City minor league pitchers for the season. He was named Pacific Coast League Pitcher of the Week for the week ended July 22. In 2019 he pitched three games for the Naturals, and 24 games for the Storm Chasers. He was a combined 8–8 with a 4.86 ERA in 127.2 innings on the year.

Kalish did not play in a game in 2020 due to the cancellation of the minor league season because of the COVID-19 pandemic. In 2021, Kalish made 30 appearances for Triple-A Omaha, but struggled greatly to a 3-6 record and 6.94 ERA with 106 strikeouts in 96.0 innings pitched across 30 appearances. He elected free agency following the season on November 7, 2021.

=== Los Angeles Angels ===
On March 19, 2022, Kalish signed a minor league contract with the Los Angeles Angels. He pitched for the Triple–A Salt Lake Bees of the Pacific Coast League, and was 10-2 (his 10 wins tied for the league lead) with a 2.87 ERA (7th in the league) in 23 games (11 starts) covering 84 2/3 innings in which he walked only 19 batters (2.0 walks per 9 innings; 4th), 3.79 strikeouts/walk (7th), and a 1.134 WHIP (7th). He elected free agency following the season on November 10.

In his minor league career through 2022, Kalish was 37–35 with a 4.13 ERA and 577 strikeouts. He re-signed with the Angels on a minor league deal on December 22, 2022, and began the 2023 season back with Triple–A Salt Lake. In 30 games (25 starts) for the Bees, Kalish registered a 9–11 record and 7.19 ERA with 103 strikeouts across 137 2/3 innings pitched. He elected free agency following the season on November 6, 2023.

=== Uni-President Lions ===
On February 2, 2024, Kalish signed with the Uni-President Lions of the Chinese Professional Baseball League. He pitched only for the Lions' farm team, logging a 2.30 ERA and 1.16 WHIP across 74 1/3 innings pitched. Kalish was released by the Lions on August 8.

On June 21, 2025, Kalish announced his retirement from professional baseball via Instagram.

== World Baseball Classic ==
Kalish pitched for Team Israel at the 2017 World Baseball Classic in March 2017, twice facing Team Netherlands.

Kalish pitched for Team Israel in the 2023 World Baseball Classic.

== See also ==
- List of select Jewish baseball players
