= Dave Bry =

Editor and writer

- Born: December 18, 1970; Red Bank, New Jersey, U.S.
- Died: October 15, 2017 (aged 46)
- Education: Red Bank Regional High School; Connecticut College
- Occupations: Editor, author, music journalist
- Notable work: Public Apology
- Spouse: Emily Raimes (m. 2001)
- Children: 1

Dave Bry (December 18, 1970 – October 15, 2017) was an American writer, music journalist, and editor. He served as editor of Vibe, Spin, and XXL and was a columnist for The Awl. He also authored a non-fiction book, Public Apology: In Which a Man Grapples with a Lifetime of Regret, One Incident at a Time (Grand Central, 2013).

== Early life ==
Bry was born in 1970 in Red Bank, New Jersey and raised in nearby Little Silver. His father was a psychologist and his mother was a faculty member at the Rutgers University Graduate School of Applied and Professional Psychology. Bry attended Red Bank Regional High School then Connecticut College, where one of his freshman roommates was Sean Spicer.

== Career ==
=== Public Apology ===
Begun in 2009 as a column for The Awl, Public Apology is an epistolary memoir in which Bry recounted his life via letters of apology for what Nathan Deuel described in Bookforum as "misdeeds great and small"; Deuel praised the book's "slyly understated style," saying "Bry’s restraint lends his prose its own brand of keenness and charisma."

In Rolling Stone, Patrick Doyle described the book as "a window into growing up in the late Eighties, when John Hughes films and Def Leppard ruled the world."

== Death ==
Bry died of cancer on October 15, 2017 in Brooklyn at the age of 46.
