= Leo Massa =

American cross-country skier (1929–2009)

Personal information
- Born: October 15, 1929 Clearwater, Florida, United States
- Died: September 3, 2009 (aged 79) Long Branch, New Jersey, United States

Sport
- Sport: Cross-country skiing

Leo Massa (October 15, 1929 – September 3, 2009) was an American cross-country skier. He competed in the men's 30 kilometre event at the 1960 Winter Olympics.

Raised in Red Bank, New Jersey, Massa played baseball at Red Bank Regional High School well enough to earn a Major League Baseball tryout, before switching over to focus cross-country skiing, a sport he learned in Finland, his father's home country, during his pre-teen years.
