= Garrett Sickels =

American football player (born 1994)

No. 56
- Position: Linebacker

Personal information
- Born: September 24, 1994 (age 32); Red Bank, New Jersey, U.S.
- Listed height: 6 ft 4 in (1.93 m)
- Listed weight: 254 lb (115 kg)

Career information
- High school: Red Bank Regional (Little Silver, New Jersey)
- College: Penn State
- NFL draft: 2017: undrafted

Career history
- Indianapolis Colts (2017)*; Cleveland Browns (2017)*; Los Angeles Rams (2017–2018); Washington Redskins (2019)*
- * Offseason or practice squad member only

Awards and highlights
- Second-team All-Big Ten (2016); Third-team All-Big Ten (2015)
- Stats at Pro Football Reference

Garrett Ross Sickels (born September 24, 1994) is an American former professional football player who was a linebacker in the National Football League (NFL). He played college football for the Penn State Nittany Lions, and signed as an undrafted free agent with Indianapolis Colts the in 2017. He played for three seasons, signing with four teams.

== Early life ==
Sickels played all four years at Red Bank Regional High School, but didn't see significant playing time until his junior year playing mostly special teams his first two years. He recorded 194 tackles, 25 sacks, nine forced fumbles and eight blocked kicks in his career. Selected to play in the 2013 U.S. Army All-American game, where he roomed with future Nittany Lion teammate Brendan Mahon. Rated a four-star recruit by ESPN.com, Rivals.com and Scout.com and was the Rivals.com No. 3 overall prep player in New Jersey.

== College career ==
Sickles arrived at Penn State in 2013 but redshirted his true freshman season. Sickles racked up over 90 tackles, 29 of which were tackles for loss or no gain. Sickles best performance was on October 22, 2016, when he had 9 tackles including 2.5 sacks vs Ohio State. After his junior season he was named to Phil Steele's and the Athlon Sports All-Big Ten third-team, Selected All-Big Ten second-team by the conference coaches and All-Big Ten third-team by the media panel. Named Most Valuable Defensive Player at the annual Nittany Lion Football Banquet.

On January 4, 2017, Sickles declared for the 2017 NFL draft.

=== Statistics ===
| Season | | | Tackles | | | | | Interceptions | | | | | |
| Year | Team | G | Tot | Solo | Ast | Sack | FF | Int | Yds | Avg | Lng | TD | PD |
|---|---|---|---|---|---|---|---|---|---|---|---|---|---|
| 2014 | Penn State | 7 | 11 | 7 | 4 | 2.0 | 0 | 0 | 0 | 0 | 0 | 0 | 1 |
| 2015 | Penn State | 12 | 36 | 13 | 23 | 3.0 | 1 | 0 | 0 | 0 | 0 | 0 | 0 |
| 2016 | Penn State | 14 | 47 | 23 | 24 | 6.5 | 0 | 0 | 0 | 0 | 0 | 0 | 1 |
| Career | | 33 | 94 | 43 | 51 | 11.5 | 1 | 0 | 0 | 0 | 0 | 0 | 2 |

== Professional career ==
Pre-draft measurables
| Height | Weight | Arm length | Hand span | 40-yard dash | 10-yard split | 20-yard split | 20-yard shuttle | Three-cone drill | Vertical jump | Broad jump | Bench press |
|---|---|---|---|---|---|---|---|---|---|---|---|
| 6 ft 3 in (1.91 m) | 261 lb (118 kg) | 32 1/8 in (0.82 m) | 9 1/2 in (0.24 m) | 4.90 s | 1.72 s | 2.84 s | 4.41 s | 7.21 s | 28.0 in (0.71 m) | 8 ft 8 in (2.64 m) | 20 reps |
All values from NFL Combine

=== Indianapolis Colts ===
After going undrafted in the 2017 NFL draft, Sickels signed with the Indianapolis Colts on May 3, 2017. He was waived on September 2, 2017, and was signed to the Colts' practice squad the next day. He was released on September 12, 2017.

=== Cleveland Browns ===
On September 25, 2017, Sickels was signed to the Cleveland Browns' practice squad. He was released on October 3, 2017.

=== Los Angeles Rams ===
On October 12, 2017, Sickels was signed to the Los Angeles Rams' practice squad. He was promoted to the active roster on December 27, 2017.

On August 4, 2018, Sickels was waived/injured by the Rams and placed on injured reserve. Without Sickels, the Rams reached Super Bowl LIII where they lost 13–3 to the New England Patriots.

=== Washington Redskins ===
On August 1, 2019, Sickels was signed by the Washington Redskins. He was waived with an injury settlement on August 11, 2019.

Sickles announced his retirement from football on August 27, 2019.
