= Red Bank Borough Public Schools =

School district in Monmouth County, New Jersey, US

Address
- 76 Branch Avenue Red Bank, Monmouth County, New Jersey, 07701; United States
- Coordinates: 40°20′46″N 74°03′36″W

District information
- Grades: PreK to 8
- Superintendent: Jared J. Rumage
- Business administrator: Anthony Sciarrillo
- Schools: 2

Students and staff
- Enrollment: 1,273 (as of 2022–23)
- Faculty: 133.6 FTEs
- Student–teacher ratio: 9.5:1

Other information
- District Factor Group: CD
- Website: www.rbb.k12.nj.us
| Ind. | Per pupil | District spending | Rank (*) | K-8 average | %± vs. average |
|---|---|---|---|---|---|
| 1A | Total Spending | $17,007 | 37 | $18,891 | −10.0% |
| 1 | Budgetary Cost | 12,862 | 23 | 14,159 | −9.2% |
| 2 | Classroom Instruction | 7,486 | 12 | 8,659 | −13.5% |
| 6 | Support Services | 2,505 | 66 | 2,167 | 15.6% |
| 8 | Administrative Cost | 1,351 | 19 | 1,547 | −12.7% |
| 10 | Operations & Maintenance | 1,376 | 27 | 1,612 | −14.6% |
| 13 | Extracurricular Activities | 49 | 10 | 104 | −52.9% |
| 16 | Median Teacher Salary | 52,150 | 4 | 61,136 |
Data from NJDoE 2014 Taxpayers' Guide to Education Spending. *Of K-8 districts with more than 750 students. Lowest spending=1; Highest=84

The Red Bank Borough Public Schools are part of a community public school district that serves students in pre-kindergarten through eighth grade from Red Bank, in Monmouth County, in the U.S. state of New Jersey.

As of the 2022–23 school year, the district, comprised of two schools, had an enrollment of 1,273 students and 133.6 classroom teachers (on an FTE basis), for a student–teacher ratio of 9.5:1.

The district is classified by the New Jersey Department of Education as being in District Factor Group "CD", the sixth-highest of eight groupings. District Factor Groups organize districts statewide to allow comparison by common socioeconomic characteristics of the local districts. From lowest socioeconomic status to highest, the categories are A, B, CD, DE, FG, GH, I and J.

For grades nine through twelve, public school students attend Red Bank Regional High School, which also serves students from Little Silver and Shrewsbury Borough, along with students in the district's academy programs from other communities who are eligible to attend on a tuition basis. Students from other Monmouth County municipalities are eligible to attend the high school for its five academy programs, with admission on a competitive basis. The borough has five elected representatives on the nine-member board of education. As of the 2022–23 school year, the high school had an enrollment of 1,195 students and 122.8 classroom teachers (on an FTE basis), for a student–teacher ratio of 9.7:1.

== Schools ==
Schools in the district (with 2022–23 enrollment data from the National Center for Education Statistics) are:

Elementary school

- Red Bank Primary School with 591 students in pre-kindergarten through third grade
  - Maria Iozzi, principal

Middle School

- Red Bank Middle School with 601 students in fourth through eighth grades
  - James Pierson, principal

== Administration ==
Core members of the district's administration are:

- Jared J. Rumage, superintendent
- Anthony Sciarrillo, business administrator and board secretary

== Board of education ==
The district's board of education, comprised of nine members, sets policy and oversees the fiscal and educational operation of the district through its administration. As a Type II school district, the board's trustees are elected directly by voters to serve three-year terms of office on a staggered basis, with three seats up for election each year held (since 2012) as part of the November general election. The board appoints a superintendent to oversee the district's day-to-day operations and a business administrator to supervise the business functions of the district.
