= Daniel Joseph O'Hern =

American judge (1930–2009)

Associate Justice of the New Jersey Supreme Court
- In office August 6, 1981 – 2000
- Nominated by: Brendan Byrne
- Preceded by: Mark A. Sullivan
- Succeeded by: James R. Zazzali

Commissioner of the New Jersey Department of Environmental Protection
- In office May 12, 1978 – July 16, 1979
- Governor: Brendan Byrne
- Preceded by: Rocco D. Ricci
- Succeeded by: Jerry F. English

Mayor of Red Bank, New Jersey
- In office 1969–1978
- Preceded by: John P. Arnone
- Succeeded by: Michael Arnone

Personal details
- Born: May 23, 1930 Red Bank, New Jersey
- Died: April 1, 2009 (aged 78) Red Bank, New Jersey
- Spouse: Barbara
- Education: Fordham University; Harvard University

Military service
- Allegiance: United States
- Branch/service: United States Navy
- Years of service: 1951–1954
- Rank: Lieutenant (junior grade)
- Battles/wars: Korean War

Daniel Joseph O'Hern (May 23, 1930 – April 1, 2009) was a former associate justice of the New Jersey Supreme Court, where he served from August 6, 1981, until his retirement upon his 70th birthday.

== Early life and career ==
O'Hern was born in Red Bank in 1930 and attended Regis High School on the Upper East Side of Manhattan. He graduated from Fordham College in 1951. O'Hern served in the United States Navy from 1951 to 1954, during the Korean War, attaining the rank of Lieutenant, Junior Grade. After leaving active duty, he graduated from Harvard Law School in 1957, and served as a clerk to United States Supreme Court Justice William J. Brennan, Jr.

He was an elected official in his hometown of Red Bank, serving on its borough council and as Mayor of Red Bank, New Jersey. Brendan Byrne, the Governor of New Jersey named O'Hern a commissioner of the New Jersey Department of Environmental Protection, and later as Counsel to the Governor. Byrne submitted his Supreme Court nomination to the New Jersey Senate, and he was confirmed on May 20, 1981, and sworn in on August 6, 1981.

Judge O'Hern's opinion in State in the Interest of T. L. O. (1983) concerning administrative or teacher searches of public school students was reversed by the U.S. Supreme Court in New Jersey v. T. L. O. (1985).

He retired at age 70, and was replaced by James R. Zazzali.

== Personal life ==
O'Hern and his wife Barbara have been residents of Little Silver, New Jersey. They had five children, three sons and two daughters.

O'Hern died at age 78 on April 1, 2009, due to brain cancer at his home in Red Bank.

== Legacy and honors ==
O'Hern was noted for his "Sal's tavern" test, which suggested that if an opinion wouldn't make sense to the "gang" at Sal's Tavern in Red Bank, New Jersey it should be rewritten.

The train station in Red Bank was named in his honor in November 2014.

== See also ==
- List of law clerks for the third seat of the Supreme Court of the United States
