= William J. Chiego =

Dr. William J. Chiego
- Born: September 17, 1943 (age 82); Newark, New Jersey
- Known for: Director

William J. Chiego (born September 17, 1943 in Newark, New Jersey) is an American museum curator. He was the director of the McNay Art Museum in San Antonio from 1991 to 2016.

== Education ==
Chiego grew up in Red Bank, New Jersey and graduated from Red Bank High School in 1961. He received a B.A. degree in history and was a member of Phi Beta Kappa at the University of Virginia in Charlottesville. He earned a Ph.D. in art history from Case Western Reserve University in Cleveland in a joint program with the Cleveland Museum of Art. Chiego has been a resident fellow at the Yale Center for British Art in New Haven, Connecticut and a participant in the Museum Management Institute. He is active in the Association of Art Museum Directors (AAMD) and is a former board member of the organization. He has also served as an adjunct professor and lecturer at both Oberlin College in Oberlin, Ohio and at Trinity University in San Antonio.

== Early career ==
Chiego came to the McNay Art Museum from Oberlin, where he was the director of the Allen Memorial Art Museum at Oberlin College from 1986 to 1991. He had held curatorial posts at the North Carolina Museum of Art in Raleigh, the Portland Art Museum in Portland, Oregon, and the Toledo Museum of Art in Toledo, Ohio.

== McNay Art Museum and its expansion ==
Since he began working at the McNay Art Museum, Chiego is credited with building on the strengths of the museum's original collections to develop in new areas. In that era, the museum's collection has more than doubled to nearly 19,000 works of art, with an emphasis on modern sculpture, prints, and drawings (particularly Mexican prints), theater arts, and contemporary works in various media. He has run a comprehensive conservation program having conservators assess the condition of individual works, as well as renovating the environmental systems at the museum.

In 1997 Chiego initiated a strategic plan for additional space to accommodate the needs of the museum's exhibition schedule and growing collection. After overseeing the $7.1 million renovation of the museum's landmark Spanish Colonial Revival facility in 2001, Chiego, with the museum's board of trustees, spearheaded a $50 million capital campaign for construction of the Jane & Arthur Stieren Center for Exhibitions. Award-winning architect Jean-Paul Viguier designed the addition, which opened in June 2008 and nearly doubled the size of the museum, allowing for year-round installation of significant works in the collection. Major exhibitions hosted by the Stieren Center include George Rickey Kinetic Sculpture: A Retrospective; Reclaimed: Paintings from the Collection of Jacques Goudstikker; and George Nelson: Architect, Writer, Designer, Teacher.

== Exhibitions and books ==
Chiego has organized scores of exhibitions and produced numerous publications, writing about the French Romantic painters, printmakers Carle Vernet and Théodore Géricault, the Scottish Romantic painter Sir David Wilkie, modern sculpture, and the history of collecting. Among the exhibitions he has organized at the McNay are Auguste Rodin: Selections from the Fine Arts Museum of San Francisco, O’Keeffe, and Texas, and retrospectives on San Antonio artists Reginald Rowe, Carl Rice Embrey, and César Martínez. Chiego has overseen several publications highlighting the museum's history and its collections including Modern Art at The McNay (2001), An Eye for the Stage: The Tobin Collection of Theatre Arts at the McNay Art Museum (2004), From Goya to Johns: Fifty Master Prints at the McNay Art Museum (2004), McNay Art Museum: An Introduction (2010); and Jane & Arthur Stieren Center for Exhibitions, McNay Art Museum (2011).
