= Molly Pitcher Inn =

New Jersey hotel and restaurant

Coordinates: 40.3530°N 74.0730°W

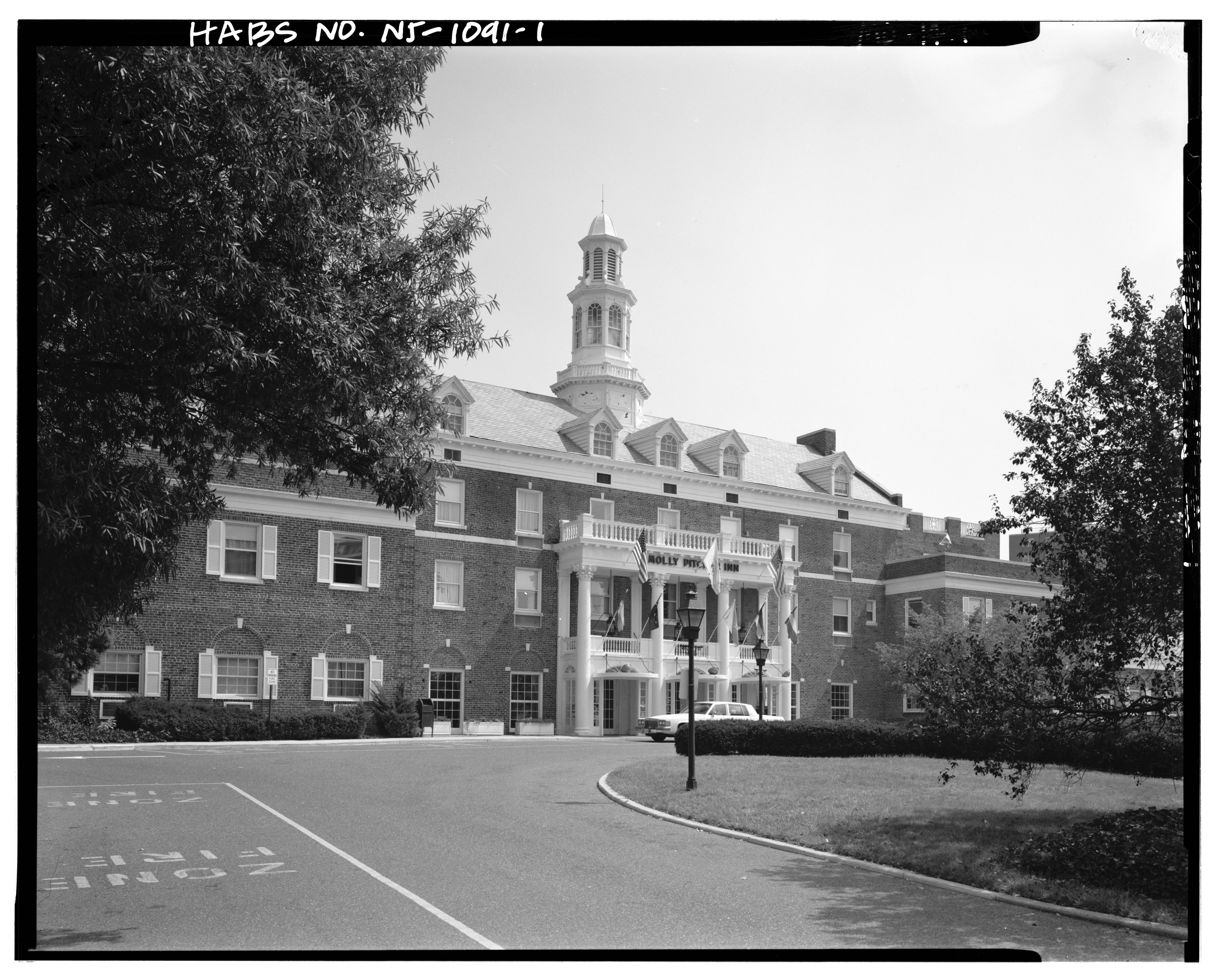
- Interactive map of the Molly Pitcher Inn area

General information
- Location: 88 Riverside Ave, Red Bank, New Jersey, U.S.
- Opening: 1928

Other information
- Number of restaurants: 1

The Molly Pitcher Inn is a privately owned boutique hotel and restaurant located in Red Bank, New Jersey. The Molly Pitcher Inn was built in 1928 and was named after Molly Pitcher. Today the Inn is a venue for weddings, banquets, fine dining, and live entertainment. The Molly Pitcher Inn also has a nearby sister hotel, the Oyster Point hotel.

== History ==
The Molly Pitcher Inn is a historic hotel that was built and established in 1928, in Red Bank, New Jersey. The Molly Pitcher Inn is located on the secluded Navesink River where its restaurant and bar overlook the scenic waterfront. The name is inspired by Molly Pitcher, an American Revolutionary War figure connected to the Battle of Monmouth. In 1992, James Barry and Kevork Hovnanian acquired ownership; the property regained a second life. James Barry, son-in-law to Kevork Hovnanian was positioned as President of The Molly Pitcher after the purchase and oversaw the complete building's sixteen month renovation. After the renovation, the Inn's business increased dramatically. In fact, the property was so successful that, in 1997, Barry and Hovnanian acquired a sister hotel right in the neighborhood, The Oyster Point Hotel. The historic Molly Pitcher Inn is a staple to the city of Red Bank.

== Molly Pitcher ==
The Molly Pitcher Inn being renovated. The opposite side of the hotel overlooks the Navesink River facing Middletown, New Jersey

Molly Pitcher was a heroic woman during the American Revolution. Molly Pitcher played a key role in the Battle of Monmouth which took place in Freehold, New Jersey which is just minutes from Red Bank, New Jersey where The Molly Pitcher Inn stands today. She is best known for carrying pitchers of water to the soldiers during The Battle of Monmouth. Molly Pitchers birth name was Mary Ludwig but the soldiers on the battlefield referred to her by the nickname they had given her. Like many women did during those days, Molly Pitcher followed her husband from Carlisle Pennsylvania back to New Jersey. She not only carried water to the thirsty soldiers, but she also tended to wounds, cleaned clothes, and many other important tasks. There is even a story saying that her husband had fainted during battle and Pitcher took over his cannon during the battle. Molly Pitcher was a very popular woman due to her heroic work during the Revolutionary War.

== Marina ==
The Molly Pitcher Inn marina is located on the Navesink River twenty-five miles from New York City.The Molly Pitcher Inn Marina provides either seasonal boat slips or transient boat slips to people traveling around and looking for a short stay. In 2009, the Molly Pitcher Inn Marina awarded $93,581 for a Phase 1 National Boating infrastructure Grant. The project added five new slips to the Inn's marina. The slips were dedicated for use and helped alleviate the marina's shortage of large slips to accommodate transient boaters. The Marina now has a total of seventy-two boat slips that can handle vessels up to sixty-five feet.
