= Red Bank, New Jersey =

Borough in Monmouth County, New Jersey, US

- Borough
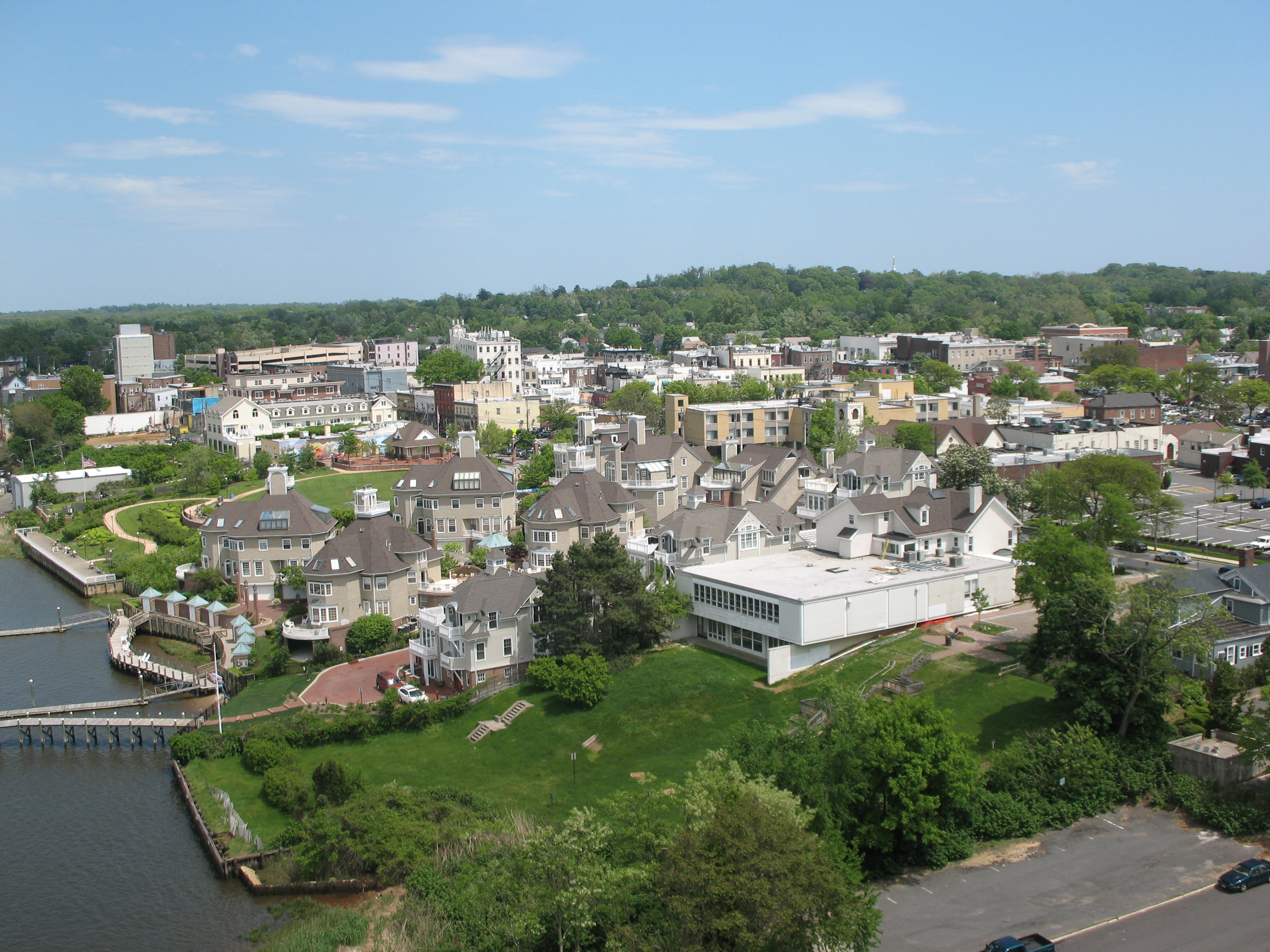
- Aerial view of Red Bank in May 2007

- Seal

- Location of Red Bank in Monmouth County highlighted in red (left). Inset map: Location of Monmouth County in New Jersey highlighted in orange (right).

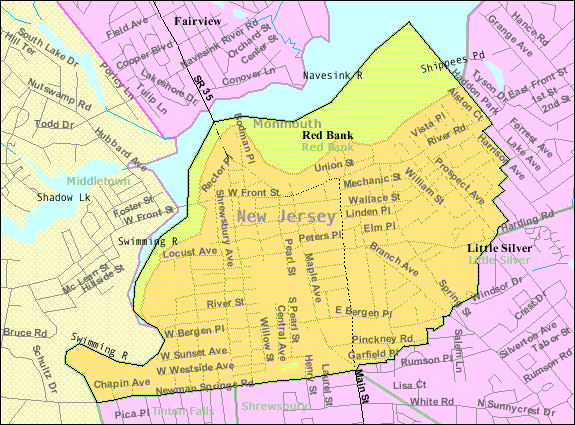
- Census Bureau map of Red Bank, New Jersey
- Interactive map of Red Bank, New Jersey
- Location in Monmouth County Location in New Jersey Location in the United States
- Coordinates: 40.348722°N 74.066528°W
- Country: United States
- State: New Jersey
- County: Monmouth
- Incorporated: March 17, 1870 (as town)
- Reincorporated: March 10, 1908 (as borough)
- Change to Faulkner Act (council–manager): July 1, 2023

Government
  - Type: Faulkner Act (council–manager)
  - Body: Borough Council
  - Mayor: William J. Portman (term ends December 31, 2027)
  - Administrator: James Gant
  - Municipal clerk: Vacant

Area
  - Total: 2.15 sq mi (5.58 km^{2})
  - Land: 1.75 sq mi (4.52 km^{2})
  - Water: 0.41 sq mi (1.06 km^{2}) 18.98%
  - Rank: 397th of 565 in state 28th of 53 in county
- Elevation: 43 ft (13 m)

Population (2020)
  - Total: 12,936
  - Estimate (2025): 12,896
  - Rank: 197th of 565 in state 16th of 53 in county
  - Density: 7,408.9/sq mi (2,860.6/km^{2})
  - Rank: 63rd of 565 in state 4th of 53 in county
- Time zone: UTC−05:00 (Eastern (EST))
  - Summer (DST): UTC−04:00 (Eastern (EDT))
- ZIP Codes: 07701–07704, 07709
- Area codes: 732 and 848
- FIPS code: 3402562430
- GNIS feature ID: 0885366
- Website: redbanknj.org

Red Bank is a borough in Monmouth County, in the U.S. state of New Jersey. Incorporated in 1908, the community is on the Navesink River, the area's original transportation route to the Atlantic Ocean and to other ports. Red Bank is in the New York metropolitan area and is a commuter town of New York City. As of the 2020 United States census, the borough's population was 12,936, its highest decennial census count ever and an increase of 730 (+6.0%) from the 2010 census count of 12,206, which in turn had reflected an increase of 362 (+3.1%) from the 11,844 counted at the 2000 census. In the 2020 census, Red Bank was the fourth-most densely populated municipality in Monmouth County.

Red Bank was formed as a town on March 17, 1870, from parts of Shrewsbury Township. On February 14, 1879, Red Bank became Shrewsbury City, part of Shrewsbury Township; this lasted until May 15, 1879, when Red Bank regained its independence. On March 10, 1908, Red Bank was formed as a borough by an act of the New Jersey Legislature and was set off from Shrewsbury Township. The borough was named for the red soil along the Navesink River.

Downtown Red Bank is notable for its many local and well-known businesses including Garmany, Urban Outfitters, and Tiffany & Co. on and around Broad Street. Many annual events happen throughout the year, including the International Beer, Wine & Food Festival, a long-running sidewalk sale, a farmers' market, an indie film festival, the Red Bank Guinness Oyster Festival, a Halloween parade, and a holiday town lighting.

== History ==
Red Bank has been occupied by indigenous peoples for thousands of years. The area of modern-day Red Bank was the territory of the Algonquian-speaking Lenape Native Americans, also called the Delaware by the English. The Lenape lived in the area between the Navesink River and the Shrewsbury River in an area they called Navarumsunk. The Native Americans traded freely with European settlers from England and the Dutch Republic in the mid-17th century, who purchased land in the area.

Originally part of "Shrewsbury Towne", Red Bank was named in 1736, when Thomas Morford sold Joseph French "a lot of over three acres on the west side of the highway that goes to the red bank". English colonists settled Red Bank beginning in the 17th century and it became a center for shipbuilding. Its population grew rapidly after 1809, when regularly scheduled passenger ships were established to serve the route to Manhattan.

By 1844, Red Bank had become a commercial and manufacturing center, focused on textiles, tanning, furs, and other goods for sale in Manhattan. With the dredging of the Navesink River about 1845, Red Bank became a port from which steamboats transported commuters to work in Manhattan. Red Bank grew in size as a result, and because the Raritan and Delaware Bay Railroad constructed a railway in the town in 1860.

In the 20th century, Red Bank was a strong cultural, economic, and political center in Monmouth County until it was hindered by the economic recession that began in 1987. During this time, its economy, based largely on retail commerce, was in decline, due to a real estate scandal. Local pundits and urban planners referred to the town as "Dead Bank".

Beginning in approximately 1991, under the New Jersey Development and Redevelopment Law, the borough authorized the creation of the Red Bank RiverCenter to manage redevelopment in what was designated as a special improvement district. RiverCenter retains authority over the management and redevelopment of a defined central business district, which includes Broad Street from the post office to Marine Park and from Maple Avenue to one block east of Broad Street. A number of urban redevelopment projects have taken place, including improved signage, distinctive and pedestrian-friendly sidewalks and lighting, a coherent design plan for Main Street and other major thoroughfares, and improving the condition of parking lots with landscaping.

The district as originally proposed was larger, to include the commercial areas west of Maple Avenue, including the antique buildings, The Galleria, and Shrewsbury Avenue. But some property owners in this area opposed paying the special assessment. Plans for the larger district advanced but opposition became more rigorous. The proposed district was amended to exclude opponents, and the district that was adopted stops on Maple Avenue.

== Geography ==
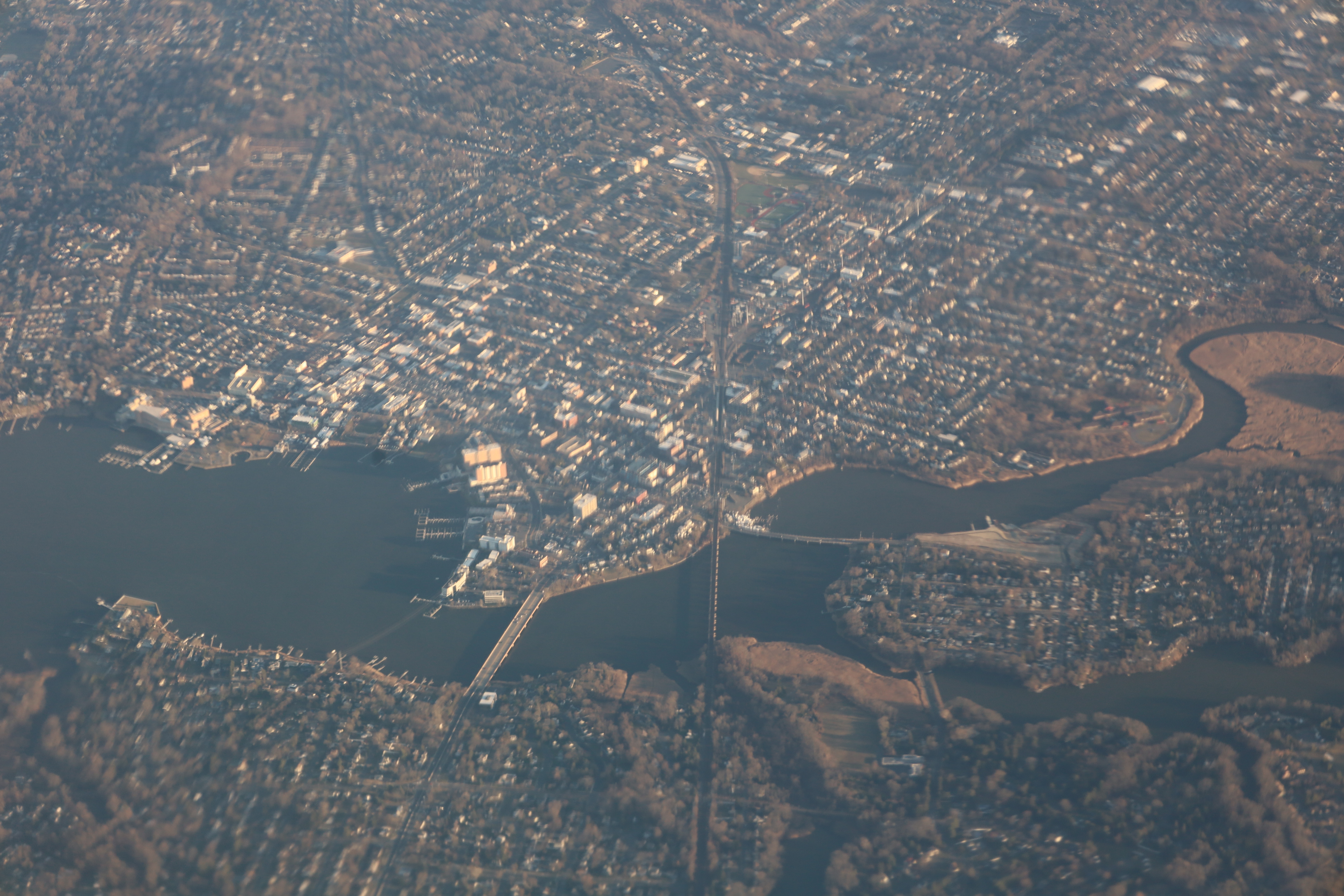
Aerial view in 2023

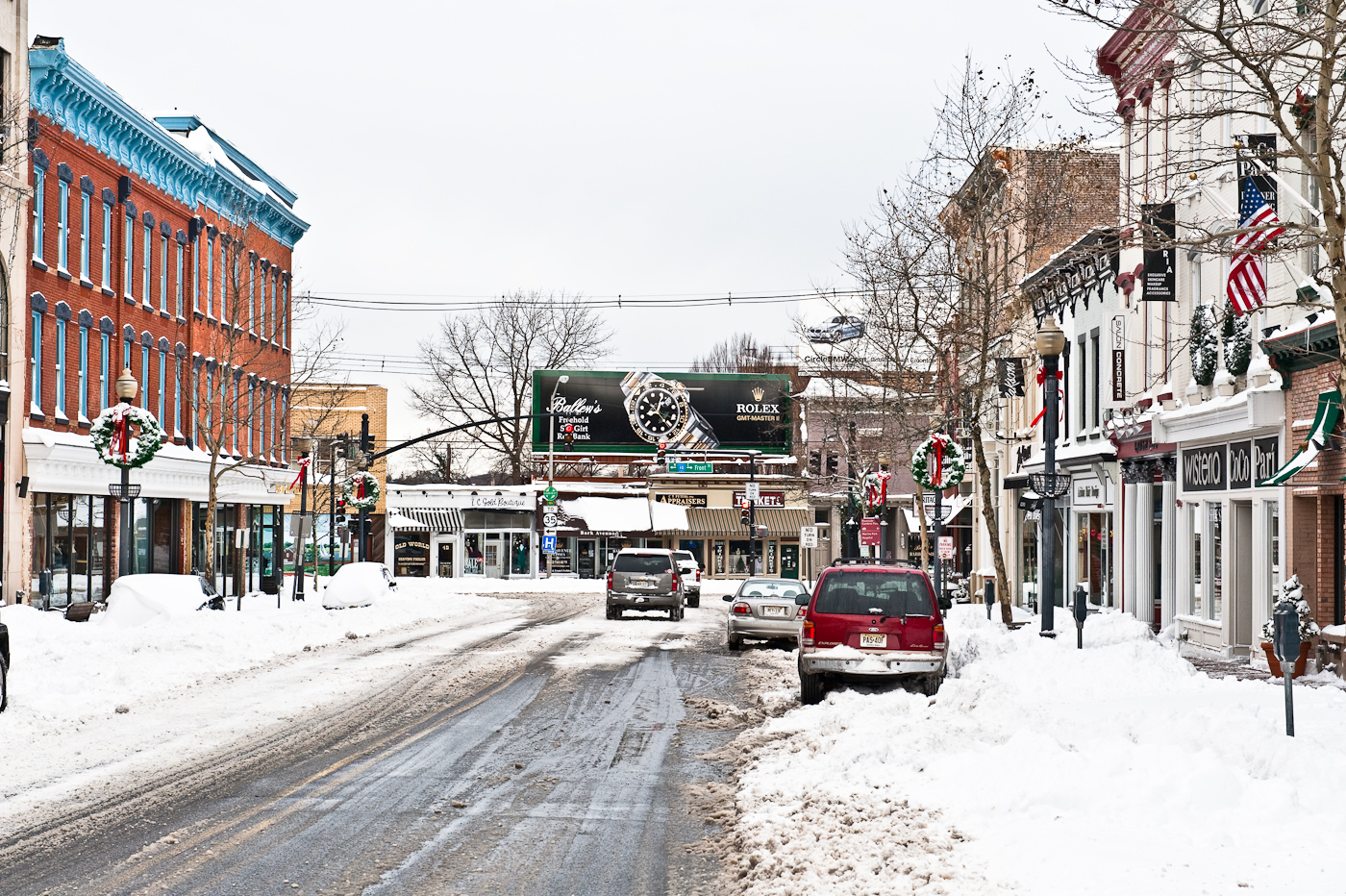
Downtown Red Bank

According to the United States Census Bureau, the borough had an area of 2.16 square miles (5.58 km^{2}), including 1.75 square miles (4.52 km^{2}) of land and 0.41 square miles (1.06 km^{2}) of water (18.98%).

Red Bank is on the southern bank of the Navesink River in northern Monmouth County. It is about 24 miles (39 km) due south of the tip of Manhattan and about 25 nautical miles (46 km) to the tip of Manhattan if traveling by water along the Navesink River and through the Raritan Bay.

Unincorporated communities, localities and place names partially or completely within the borough include Newmans Corner.

Red Bank is bordered by the Monmouth County municipalities of Fair Haven, Little Silver, Middletown, Shrewsbury and Tinton Falls.

=== Climate ===
Red Bank has a humid subtropical climate (Cfa).

Climate data for Red Bank, New Jersey
Month	Jan	Feb	Mar	Apr	May	Jun	Jul	Aug	Sep	Oct	Nov	Dec	Year
Mean daily maximum °F (°C)	39 (4)	42 (6)	50 (10)	59 (15)	68 (20)	78 (26)	83 (28)	82 (28)	76 (24)	65 (18)	55 (13)	44 (7)	62 (17)
Mean daily minimum °F (°C)	25 (−4)	27 (−3)	34 (1)	42 (6)	51 (11)	62 (17)	67 (19)	66 (19)	59 (15)	47 (8)	39 (4)	30 (−1)	46 (8)
Average precipitation inches (mm)	4.12 (105)	3.30 (84)	4.16 (106)	4.17 (106)	4.46 (113)	3.25 (83)	4.47 (114)	5.04 (128)	4.01 (102)	3.28 (83)	3.97 (101)	3.90 (99)	48.13 (1,223)

== Demographics ==
Historical population
Census	Pop.	Note	%±
1870	2,086		—
1880	2,684		28.7%
1890	4,145		54.4%
1900	5,428		31.0%
1910	7,398		36.3%
1920	9,251		25.0%
1930	11,622		25.6%
1940	10,974		−5.6%
1950	12,743		16.1%
1960	12,482		−2.0%
1970	12,847		2.9%
1980	12,031		−6.4%
1990	10,636		−11.6%
2000	11,844		11.4%
2010	12,206		3.1%
2020	12,936		6.0%
2025 (est.)	12,896	▼	−0.3%
Population sources:1870–1920 1870 1880–1890; 1890–1910 1910–1930; 1940–2000 2000; 2010 2020

=== 2020 census ===
As of the 2020 census, Red Bank had a population of 12,936, with 5,423 households and 2,321 families. The population density was 7,392 inhabitants per square mile (2,854/km^{2}). There were 5,863 housing units at an average density of 3,350.3 inhabitants per square mile (1,293.6/km^{2}).

The median age was 38.1 years. 21.1% of residents were under the age of 18 and 15.7% were 65 years of age or older. The population was 49.4% male and 50.6% female. For every 100 females, there were 97.5 males, and for every 100 females age 18 and over there were 96.1 males age 18 and over.

100.0% of residents lived in urban areas, while 0.0% lived in rural areas.

Of the 5,423 households, 26.2% had children under the age of 18 living in them. 33.9% were married-couple households, 23.7% were households with a male householder and no spouse or partner present, and 33.5% were households with a female householder and no spouse or partner present. About 40.1% of all households were made up of individuals, and 13.9% had someone living alone who was 65 years of age or older. 7.5% of housing units were vacant; the homeowner vacancy rate was 2.3% and the rental vacancy rate was 5.3%.

Racial composition as of the 2020 census
Race	Number	Percent
White	6,883	53.2%
Black or African American	1,012	7.8%
American Indian and Alaska Native	267	2.1%
Asian	236	1.8%
Native Hawaiian and Other Pacific Islander	2	0.0%
Some other race	2,978	23.0%
Two or more races	1,558	12.0%
Hispanic or Latino (of any race)	4,890	37.8%

=== 2010 census ===
The 2010 United States census counted 12,206 people, 4,929 households, and 2,469 families in the borough. The population density was 7,019.1 per square mile (2,710.1/km^{2}). There were 5,381 housing units at an average density of 3,094.4 per square mile (1,194.8/km^{2}). The racial makeup was 63.20% (7,714) White, 12.42% (1,516) Black or African American, 0.97% (118) Native American, 1.85% (226) Asian, 0.11% (13) Pacific Islander, 18.56% (2,265) from other races, and 2.90% (354) from two or more races. Hispanic or Latino of any race were 34.39% (4,198) of the population.

Of the 4,929 households, 23.1% had children under the age of 18; 32.8% were married couples living together; 11.5% had a female householder with no husband present and 49.9% were non-families. Of all households, 40.1% were made up of individuals and 12.7% had someone living alone who was 65 years of age or older. The average household size was 2.43 and the average family size was 3.29.

20.4% of the population were under the age of 18, 9.3% from 18 to 24, 34.6% from 25 to 44, 23.0% from 45 to 64, and 12.7% who were 65 years of age or older. The median age was 35.2 years. For every 100 females, the population had 103.6 males. For every 100 females ages 18 and older there were 103.5 males.

The Census Bureau's 2006–2010 American Community Survey showed that (in 2010 inflation-adjusted dollars) median household income was $59,118 (with a margin of error of $9,139) and the median family income was $79,922 (+/− $12,117). Males had a median income of $51,053 (+/− $6,351) versus $47,368 (+/− $9,445) for females. The per capita income for the borough was $36,424 (+/− $3,310). About 13.1% of families and 14.7% of the population were below the poverty line, including 26.5% of those under 18 and 9.7% of those 65 or older.

=== 2000 census ===
As of the 2000 United States census there were 11,844 people, 5,201 households, and 2,501 families residing in the borough. The population density was 6,639.1 inhabitants per square mile (2,563.4/km^{2}). There were 5,450 housing units at an average density of 3,055.0 per square mile (1,179.5/km^{2}). The racial makeup of the borough was 68.19% White, 20.05% African American, 0.35% Native American, 2.19% Asian, 0.08% Pacific Islander, 6.73% from other races, and 2.41% from two or more races. Hispanic or Latino of any race were 17.11% of the population.

There were 5,201 households, of which 18.0% had children under age 18 living with them, 32.2% were married couples living together, 11.6% had a female householder with no husband present, and 51.9% were non-families. 42.9% of all households were made up of individuals, and 15.9% had someone living alone who 65 or older. The average household size was 2.20 and the average family size was 2.99.

In the borough the population was spread out, with 17.5% under 18, 8.7% from 18 to 24, 35.2% from 25 to 44, 20.3% from 45 to 64, and 18.3% who were 65 or older. The median age was 38. For every 100 females, there were 91.8 males. For every 100 females 18 and over, there were 88.9 males.

The median income for a household was $47,282, and the median income for a family was $63,333. Males had a median income of $45,922 versus $34,231 for females. The per capita income was $26,265. About 6.3% of families and 12.0% of the population were below the poverty line, including 16.5% of those under 18 and 10.6% of those 65 or older.

== Economy ==
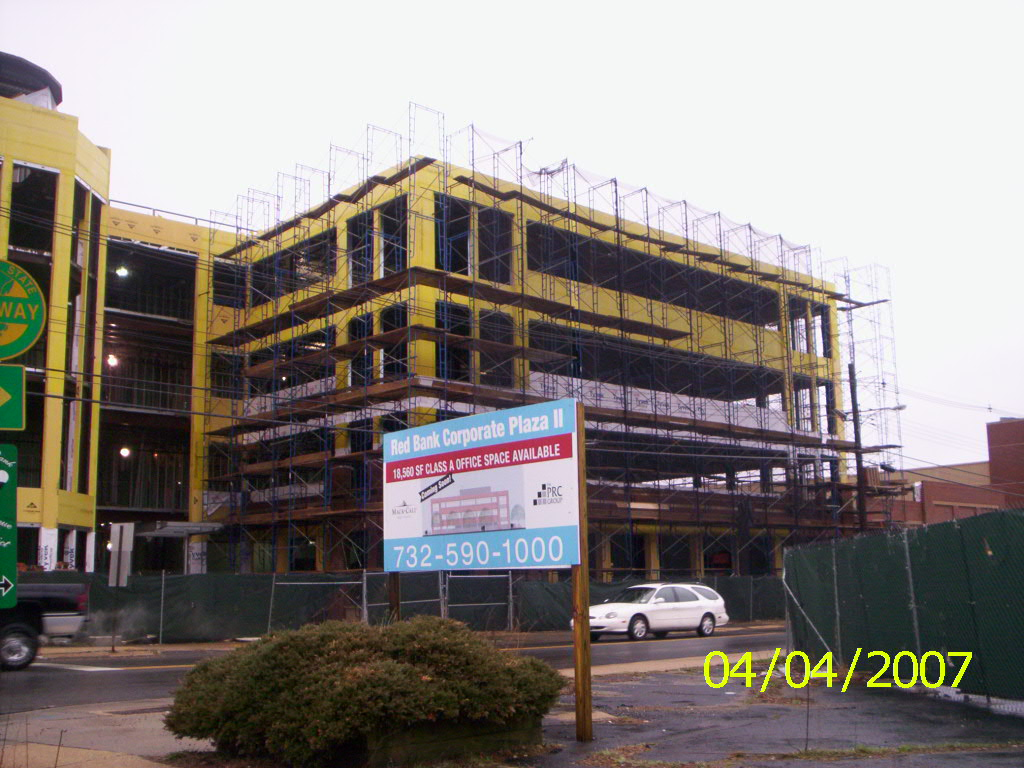
New office building construction on West Front Street

Red Bank has a mix of businesses, including companies in entertainment, retail, professional, medical, and hospitality sectors, including major national and luxury retailers.

=== Business districts ===
Red Bank has four main business districts throughout the town. The largest is the historic commercial center of Downtown Red Bank, which mainly runs along Broad Street. Other major connected commercial streets include Monmouth Street, Front Street, and White Street, all of which make up the Broad Street Historic District. Downtown includes a mixed variety of businesses, restaurants, and entertainment, ranging from high end retailers and fine dining to cheap eats and food. A section of Broad Street is closed off every year to allow for outdoor dining.

The second largest commercial corridor is Shrewsbury Avenue, with most of the businesses being located between West Front Street and Drs. James Parker Boulevard, and primarily serves the West Side of the town with many neighborhood-oriented retail and restaurants.

The third commercial corridor is Newman Springs Road, which is a highway commercial district bordered with Shrewsbury and Tinton Falls, consisting of several car dealerships, auto body shops, and gas stations with large building footprints and parking lots.

The fourth commercial district is the train station area, which is actively being redeveloped as a mixed used walkable transit-oriented community after being the primary industrial area of the borough, and includes various restaurants and shops, as well as redeveloped industrial buildings such as the Galleria. While each commercial area is distinct from one another, Monmouth and West Front Streets' development will connect Downtown with Shrewsbury Avenue through the train station area.

=== Jobs ===
As of 2019, Red Bank has 11,325 jobs in a variety of sectors, such as retail, healthcare, construction, food services, arts and entertainment, hospitality, etc. As of 2022, the largest employer is Riverview Medical Center with 1,450 employees. The largest employers following the hospital include Super Foodtown, Colliers Engineering & Design, Arrow Limousine Worldwide, Oceanfirst Financial Corp., Torcon, Seals Eastern Inc., Molly Pitcher Inn, Giordano, Halleran, & Ciesla; and Red Bank Catholic High School. Most jobs tend to be located along the four commercial corridors, particularly around downtown and the train station.

Of the 6,133 employed population of Red Bank, only about 12% both live and work within the borough. Of Red Bank residents, 83% work in New Jersey, with 47% in Monmouth County, 14% in New York City, and 9% in Middlesex County, with neighboring municipalities being the most common work destinations. Of non-resident workers of Red Bank, 95% live in New Jersey, with 61% living in Monmouth County, 11% in Ocean County, and 7.5% in Middlesex County, with most coming from neighboring communities. Overall, 757 people work and live in Red Bank, 10,568 non-residents commute into Red Bank, and 5,376 resident commute out of Red Bank.

== Arts and culture ==
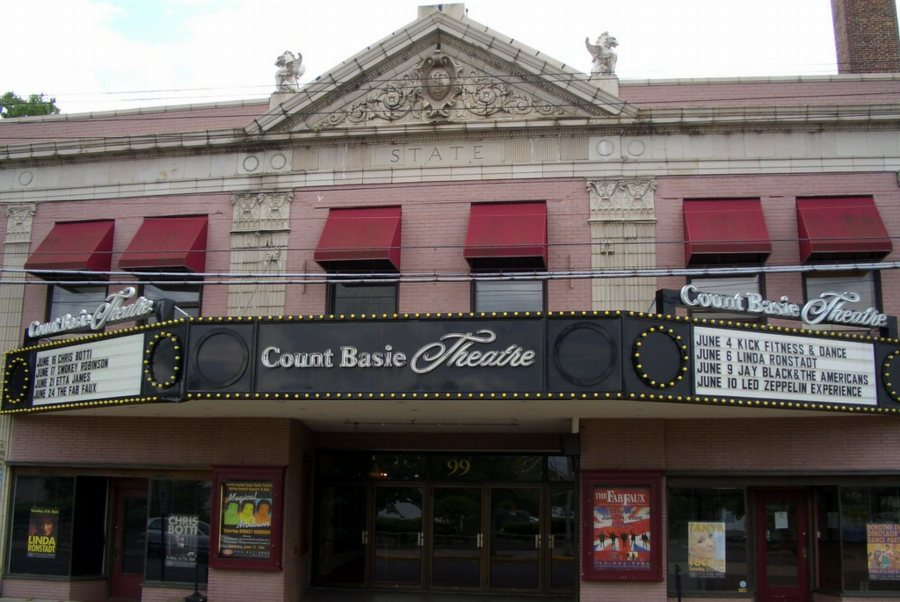
The Count Basie Center for the Arts, named for Count Basie, who was born in Red Bank

Red Bank is a noted social and commercial destination, filled with boutiques, designer clothing and home stores, parks, and restaurants with special events scheduled throughout the year

Since the 1950s, Red Bank has held the Annual Red Bank Sidewalk Sale. The 58th Annual Sidewalk Sale was held from July 27 to July 29, 2012, and was seen in "The Sidewalk Stash", the November 11, 2012 episode of the reality TV series Comic Book Men.

The town is considered a center of artistic activity, and is home to the Monmouth County Arts Council, as well as several art and photography galleries.

Many venues in Red Bank have live performances, plays, and movie showings, including Count Basie Center for the Arts, named for Count Basie, who was born in Red Bank, Basie Center Cinemas, and the Two River Theater.

The Count Basie Theatre has hosted performers such as Kevin Smith, Ariana Grande, Bruce Springsteen, Bon Jovi, The Beach Boys, David Sedaris, Tracy Morgan, Bob Newhart, Foreigner, Andy Williams, Brian Setzer, and B.B. King. On April 30, 2005, the Two River Theater Company opened a large performance space, the Two River Theater, which has hosted performers like Hasan Minhaj. Bruce Springsteen filmed his 2005 VH-1 Storytellers special at the theater. Basie Center Cinemas (formerly known as The Marion Huber Theater), also operated by the Two River Theater Company, is a small black box theater that seats about 100.

Broad Street is one of the borough's central streets and is known for its lavish Christmas decorations during the holiday season. The street is closed to traffic for a free concert sponsored by Holiday Express, after which the lights are all lit again. Up to 7,000 people attend the shows annually.

Red Bank hosts the Red Bank Jazz & Blues Festival in partnership with the Jersey Shore Jazz & Blues Society. "First Night", a New Year's Eve arts and entertainment festival, is a Red Bank event designed to provide an alternative to alcohol-related events.

Each year from 1960 through 2011, a fireworks display was launched from the Navesink River close to Red Bank on July 3, the eve of Independence Day. "KaBoomFest" was held in Marine Park, where local bands and vendors formed a major gathering. In 2010, it attracted as many as 150,000 spectators at its 51st annual event.

Musical groups from Red Bank include alternative rock band Young Rising Sons, and straight-edge hardcore punk band Floorpunch.

== Sports ==
In 1998, the Red Bank Armory was converted to an ice rink. It is home to the youth hockey team Red Bank Generals.

The George Sheehan Classic began in 1981 as the Asbury Park 10K Classic and quickly became one of the nation's major road running events. The race moved to Red Bank in 1994 and was renamed in honor of George A. Sheehan, the prominent author, philosopher and area physician. Runner's World magazine named the Classic one of the Top 100 Road Races, and The New York Times named it the Best Memorial Race in New Jersey. The 2012 running, shortened to a 5K race, attracted nearly 1,300 participants.

In January 2018, FC Monmouth announced that Red Bank's Count Basie Park would be the home stadium for the team's inaugural season. The team's owners selected the park based on Red Bank's central location in the county both geographically and in terms of the local economy, along with the fact that the stadium will be easily accessible by car and by public transportation via NJ Transit rail and bus.

== Parks and recreation ==
Red Bank has eight parks, with one new park being planned as of 2023. The largest is Count Basie Park, which includes baseball fields, basketball courts, playground, track, a small trail along Mohawk Pond, and restrooms. Eastside Park, the only park located east of Broad Street, consists of a playground, soccer field, softball field, basketball court, tennis courts, benches, picnic tables, walking paths, lawn, and restrooms. Along the Navesink River, there are three parks: Marine Park, which consists of a playground, benches, boat basin, picnic tables, lawn, and restrooms; Riverside Gardens Park, which has picnic tables, benches, boardwalk, lawn, and restrooms; and Maple Cove Park, which includes a lawn and kayak launch. Bellhaven Nature Area sits along the Swimming River, which includes a turtle access point, playground, picnic table, benches, and lawn. Two small streetside parks exist in the town, including Johnny Jazz Park, which has a trail, benches, and lawn; and Veterans Park, which includes a World War II cannon, flagpole, and lawn.

There are plans to build a new large park called Sunset Avenue Park along the Swimming River on a former landfill site in the southwestern part of the borough. The park is to include wooded trails, sledding hills, a lawn, playground, boardwalk, picnic pavilion, plaza, a living wall, skatepark, kayak launch, and two parking lots. There is also a plan to completely redo Marine Park, finalized in 2019. The final concept plan includes an entry plaza with a water feature, a memorial plaza, restrooms, lawns, natural playground, event lawn/seasonal ice rink, pier, food truck space, pavilion, kayak launch, marina, sculptured waterfront plaza, shade structures, a riverboat attraction, a waterfront walkway, a parking lot, storm water management, and pump stations.

While Red Bank has 4 miles (6.4 km) of waterfront, only a small portion of it is publicly accessible. The only waterfront walkways that currently exist are those found in Marine Park, Riverside Gardens Park, Maple Cove, as well as the privately owned walkways at the Molly Pitcher Inn and Oyster Point Hotel, and at condominiums. Red Bank has the long-term plan of connecting the entire waterfront via one large publicly accessible waterfront walkway. The two main priorities are connecting the waterfronts between Marine Park and Riverside Gardens Park; as well as connecting Bellhaven Nature Area with the future Sunset Avenue Park. The borough also is in the works of making the waterfront property owned by Riverfront Medical Center into a publicly accessible waterfront.

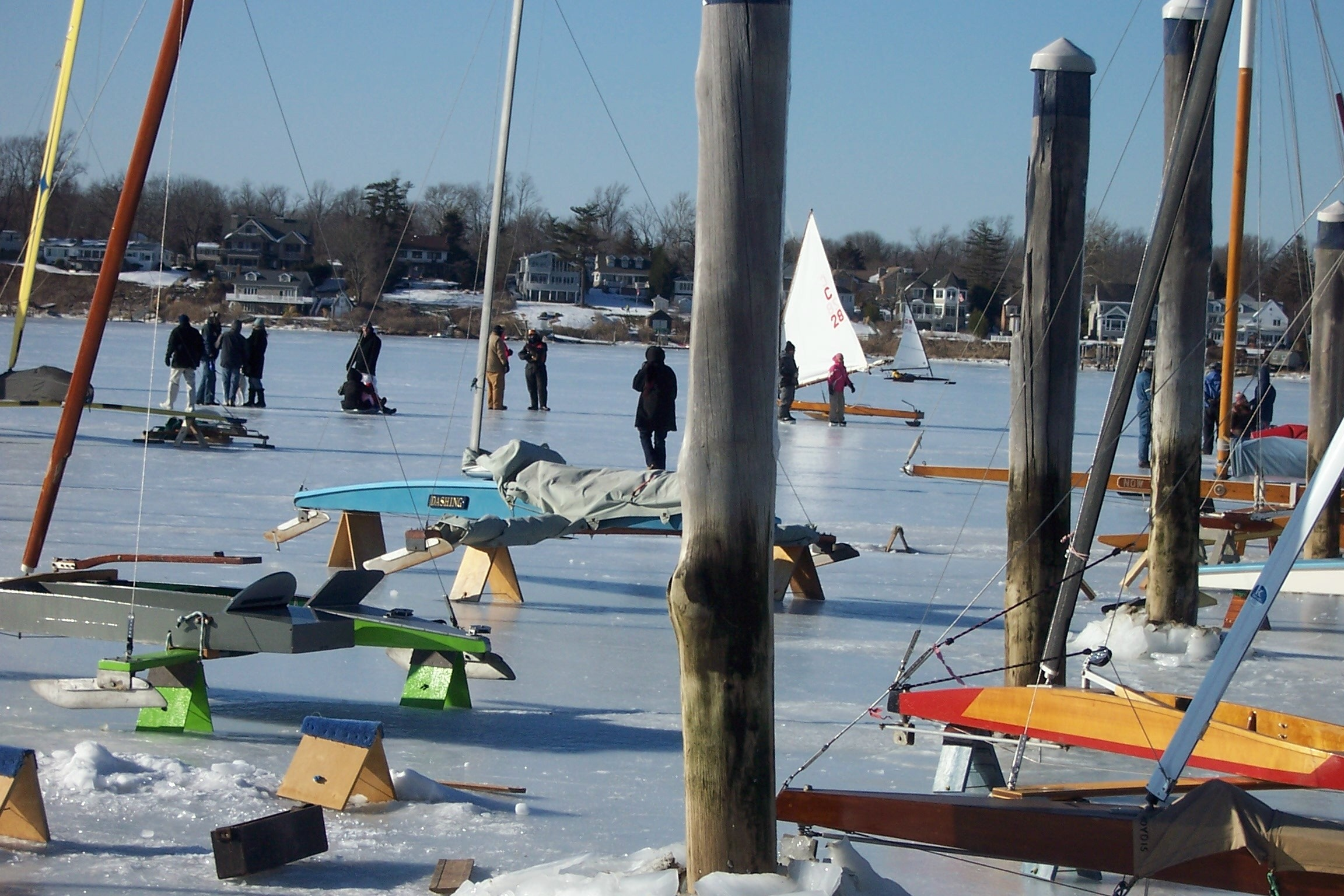
Whenever the conditions are right, ice boats appear on the Navesink.

Other recreational facilities within Red Bank include a YMCA, Red Bank Public Library, Boys & Girls Club of Monmouth County, boat & yacht clubs, and the Red Bank senior center. There are several buildings on the state and national historic register, including the T. Thomas Fortune House, the Anthony Reckless Estate, the Robert White House, Count Basie Center for the Arts, Monmouth Boat Club, Red Bank station, Monmouth Boat Club, North Shrewsbury Ice Boat & Yacht Club, River Street School, and Shrewsbury Township Hall. The borough also has designations for the Broad Street Historic District and the Washington Street Historic District.

Boating, sculling, sailing, and fishing are popular outdoor activities in and near Red Bank; in the winter, ice boats sail on the Navesink when it freezes over, as it did in 2009. The Monmouth Boat Club, Marine Park, and the slips of the Molly Pitcher Inn provide access to the Navesink and, from there, Sandy Hook and the Gateway National Recreation Area, the Jersey Shore and the Atlantic Ocean.

== Government ==
=== Local government ===
Since July 1, 2023, Red Bank has been governed under the Faulkner Act (council–manager) form of government; the borough form has been used since the borough's incorporation in 1908, and all members then serving in office under the old form had their terms end in June 2023. The governing body is comprised of the mayor and a six-member borough council, with all positions elected at-large on a non-partisan basis to serve four-year terms of office (after the initial election). In the May 2023 municipal election, a mayor and council were elected under the new form, with council members randomly assigned so that four serve two-year teams and two serve four-year terms. The Council voted in July 2023 to move elections to November, so four council seats will be up for election in November 2025, with the mayor and the other two council seats up for vote in November 2027, with that cycle continuing in odd-numbered years; the change to November elections meant that the council members elected in 2023 had their term-end month shifted from June to December.

As of 2025, the mayor of Red Bank is William J. Portman, whose term of office ends December 31, 2027. Members of the Borough Council are Deputy Mayor Kate Triggiano (2027), Kristina Bonatakis (term ending 2025), David Cassidy (2025), Nancy Facey-Blackwood (2027), Ben Forest (2025) and Laura Jannone (2025), all of whom were elected together on the "Red Bank's Ready" slate at the May 2023 election.

=== Federal, state, and county representation ===
Red Bank is in the 6th Congressional District and is part of New Jersey's 11th state legislative district.

For the 119th United States Congress, New Jersey's 6th congressional district is represented by Frank Pallone (D, Long Branch). New Jersey is represented in the United States Senate by Democrats Cory Booker (Newark, term ends 2027) and Andy Kim (Moorestown, term ends 2031).

For the 2026–2027 session, the 11th legislative district of the New Jersey Legislature is represented in the New Jersey Senate by Vin Gopal (D, Long Branch) and in the General Assembly by Margie Donlon (D, Ocean Township) and Luanne Peterpaul (D, Long Branch).

Monmouth County is governed by a Board of County Commissioners composed of five members who are elected at-large to serve three-year terms of office on a staggered basis, with either one or two seats up for election each year as part of the November general election. At an annual reorganization meeting held in the beginning of January, the board selects one of its members to serve as director and another as deputy director.

As of 2026, Monmouth County's Commissioners are Director Thomas A. Arnone (R, Neptune City, 2028),Deputy Director Nick DiRocco (R, Wall Township, 2028), Susan M. Kiley (R, Hazlet Township, 2027), Erik Anderson (R, Shrewsbury, 2026), and Ross F. Licitra (R, Marlboro Township, 2026).

Constitutional officers elected on a countywide basis are Clerk Christine Giordano Hanlon (R, 2030; Ocean Township), Sheriff Shaun Golden (R, 2028; Howell Township) and Surrogate Maureen Raisch (R, 2026; Middletown Township).

=== Politics ===
United States presidential election results for Red Bank
Year	Republican		Democratic		Third party(ies)	
Year	No.	%	No.	%	No.	%
2024	1,887	35.36%	3,347	62.71%	103	1.93%
2020	1,835	32.59%	3,713	65.95%	82	1.46%
2016	1,645	34.49%	2,931	61.46%	193	4.05%
2012	1,523	35.23%	2,730	63.15%	70	1.62%
2008	1,682	34.62%	3,129	64.41%	47	0.97%
2004	1,984	40.70%	2,849	58.44%	42	0.86%
2000	1,644	36.44%	2,539	56.27%	329	7.29%
1996	1,503	35.60%	2,417	57.25%	302	7.15%
1992	1,616	37.21%	2,091	48.15%	636	14.64%

As of March 2011, there were 6,217 registered voters in Red Bank, of whom 2,118 (34.1%) were registered Democrats, 1,185 (19.1%) were registered Republicans and 2,906 (46.7%) were registered as Unaffiliated. Eight voters were registered as Libertarians or Greens.

Gubernatorial election results for Red Bank
Year	Republican		Democratic		Third party(ies)	
Year	No.	%	No.	%	No.	%
2025	1,477	33.14%	2,942	66.01%	38	0.85%
2021	1,400	39.24%	2,124	59.53%	44	1.23%
2017	1,153	38.34%	1,799	59.83%	55	1.83%
2013	1,527	56.39%	1,116	41.21%	65	2.40%
2009	1,457	46.39%	1,460	46.48%	224	7.13%
2005	1,312	40.48%	1,761	54.34%	168	5.18%

In the 2012 presidential election, Democrat Barack Obama received 63.2% of the vote (2,730), ahead of Republican Mitt Romney with 35.2% (1,523), and other candidates with 1.6% (70), among the 4,359 ballots cast by the borough's 6,440 registered voters (36 ballots were spoiled), for a turnout of 67.7%. In the 2008 presidential election, Obama received 63.2% of the vote (3,129), ahead of Republican John McCain with 34.0% (1,682) and other candidates with 0.9% (47), among the 4,948 ballots cast by the borough's 6,669 registered voters, for a turnout of 74.2%. In the 2004 presidential election, Democrat John Kerry received 58.1% of the vote (2,849), outpolling Republican George W. Bush with 40.4% (1,984) and other candidates with 0.6% (42), among the 4,905 ballots cast by the borough's 6,856 registered voters, for a turnout percentage of 71.5.

In the 2013 gubernatorial election, Republican Chris Christie received 56.4% of the vote (1,527), ahead of Democrat Barbara Buono with 41.2% (1,116), and other candidates with 2.4% (65), among the 2,772 ballots cast by the borough's 6,510 registered voters (64 were spoiled), for a turnout of 42.6%. In the 2009 gubernatorial election, Democrat Jon Corzine received 46.0% of the vote (1,460), ahead of Christie with 45.9% (1,457), Independent Chris Daggett with 6.3% (200) and other candidates with 0.8% (24), among the 3,176 ballots cast by the borough's 6,332 registered voters, a 50.2% turnout.

United States Senate election results for Red Bank1
Year	Republican		Democratic		Third party(ies)	
Year	No.	%	No.	%	No.	%
2024	1,799	34.87%	3,250	63.00%	110	2.13%
2018	1,456	36.41%	2,395	59.89%	148	3.70%
2012	1,620	39.03%	2,430	58.54%	101	2.43%
2006	1,344	41.70%	1,784	55.35%	95	2.95%

United States Senate election results for Red Bank2
Year	Republican		Democratic		Third party(ies)	
Year	No.	%	No.	%	No.	%
2020	1,887	33.94%	3,537	63.62%	136	2.45%
2014	968	36.89%	1,583	60.33%	73	2.78%
2013	675	35.62%	1,200	63.32%	20	1.06%
2008	1,737	38.57%	2,637	58.55%	130	2.89%

== Education ==
The Red Bank Borough Public Schools serve students in pre-kindergarten through eighth grade. As of the 2022–23 school year, the district, comprised of two schools, had an enrollment of 1,273 students and 133.6 classroom teachers (on an FTE basis), for a student–teacher ratio of 9.5:1. Schools in the district (with 2022–23 enrollment data from the National Center for Education Statistics) are Red Bank Primary School with 591 students in pre-kindergarten through third grade and Red Bank Middle School with 601 students in fourth through eighth grades.

For ninth through twelfth grades, public school students attend Red Bank Regional High School, which also serves students from Little Silver and Shrewsbury, along with students in the district's academy programs from other communities who are eligible to attend on a tuition basis. Students from other Monmouth County municipalities are eligible to attend the high school for its five academy programs, with admission on a competitive basis. The borough has five elected representatives on the nine-member board of education. As of the 2022–23 school year, the high school had an enrollment of 1,195 students and 122.8 classroom teachers (on an FTE basis), for a student–teacher ratio of 9.7:1.

Red Bank Charter School is a public school for students in kindergarten through eighth grade that operates under a New Jersey Department of Education charter and accepts students and receives its funding from a portion of property taxes, like a typical public school. It does not charge tuition and operates independently of the public school system, with a separate school board. Students are selected to enroll in the charter school based on an annual lottery, which is open to all Red Bank residents of school age.

Other schools in Red Bank include Red Bank Catholic High School and St. James Elementary School, Catholic schools affiliated with Saint James parish and under the supervision of the Roman Catholic Diocese of Trenton.

== Infrastructure ==
=== Transportation ===
==== Roads and highways ====
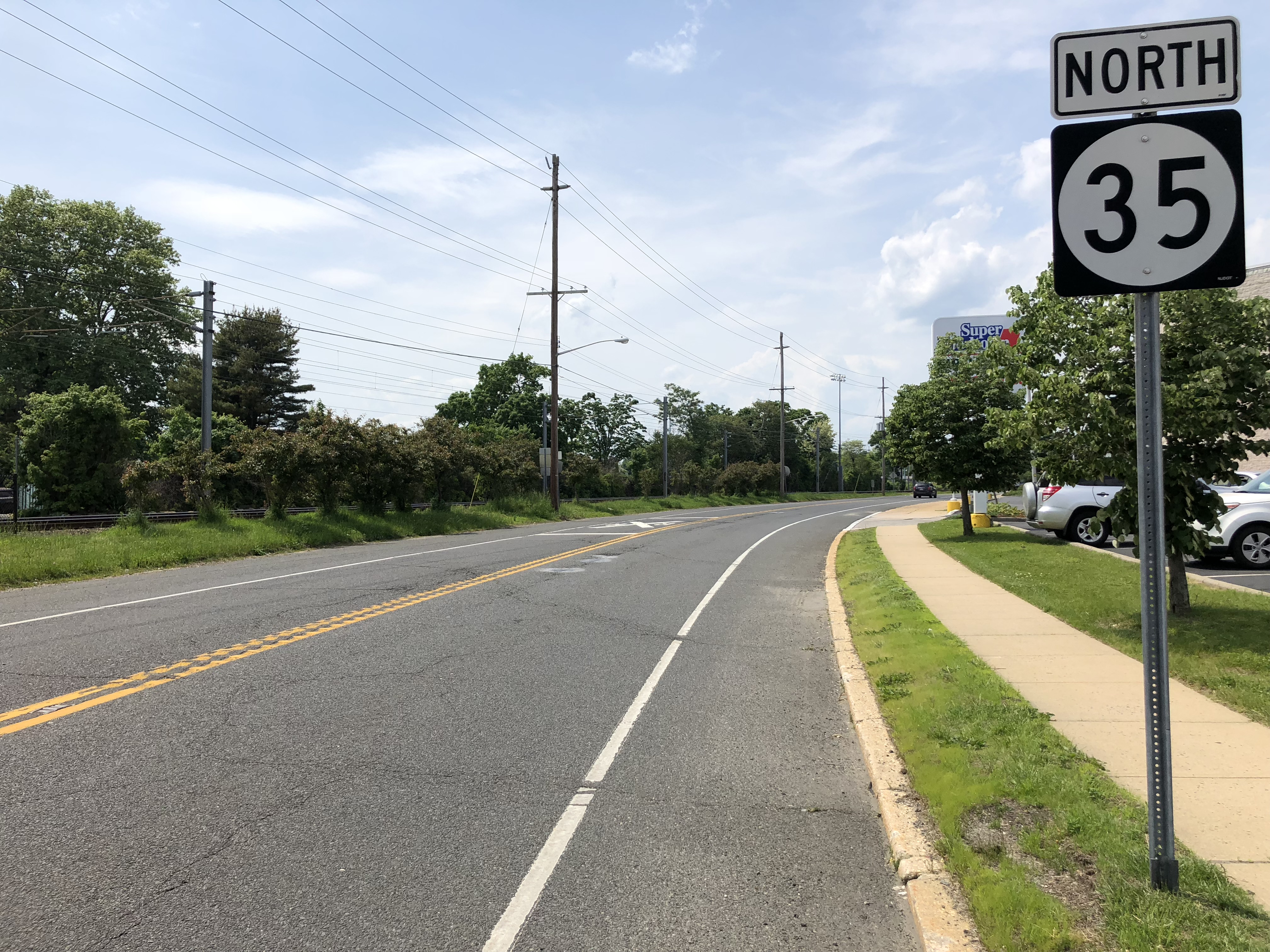
Route 35 in Red Bank

As of May 2010, the borough had 29.86 miles (48.06 km) of roadways, of which 23.09 miles (37.16 km) were maintained by the municipality, 5.25 miles (8.45 km) by Monmouth County and 1.52 miles (2.45 km) by the New Jersey Department of Transportation.

Route 35 runs north-south through the borough while County Route 520 passes through briefly in the southeastern area. Red Bank is also 2 miles (3.2 km) east of Exit 109 of the Garden State Parkway.

==== Public transportation ====
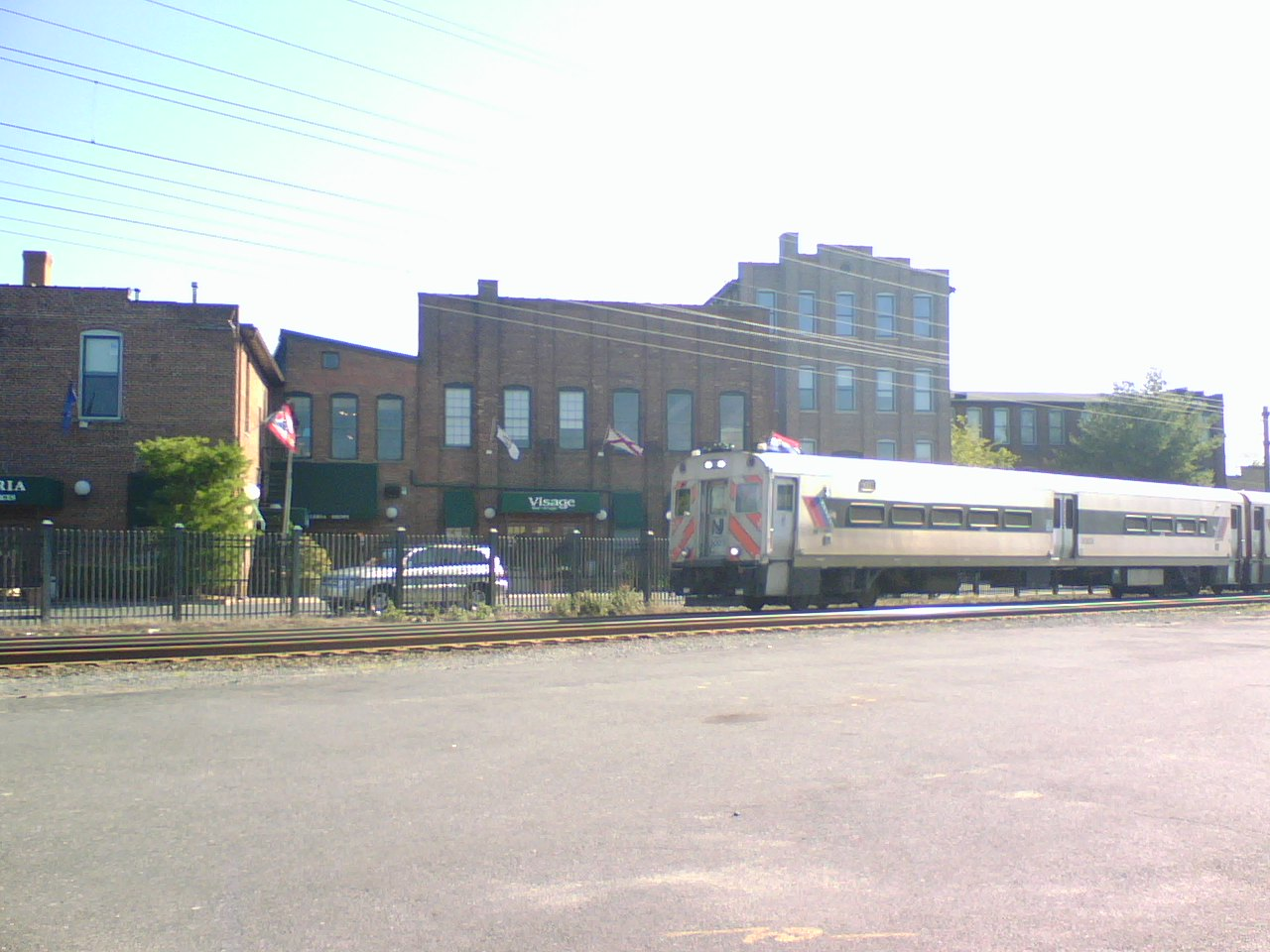
Red Bank is connected by rail to other urban centers

NJ Transit passenger trains are available at the Red Bank station. Commuter service is provided on the North Jersey Coast Line, offering express and local service. Diesel service operates from Hoboken Terminal to Bay Head station. Electric service operates from New York Penn Station to Long Branch station, where the electrified portion of the line ends. Mid-line stops include Newark Penn Station, Newark Liberty International Airport Station and Secaucus Junction.

Bus service through Red Bank is provided by Academy Bus (express to New York City) and Veolia Transport, running routes under contract to NJ Transit. Local bus service is provided on the 831, 832, 834 and 838 routes.

=== Health care ===
Riverview Medical Center is a 476-bed acute care community hospital founded in 1928 as Red Bank Hospital.

== In media ==
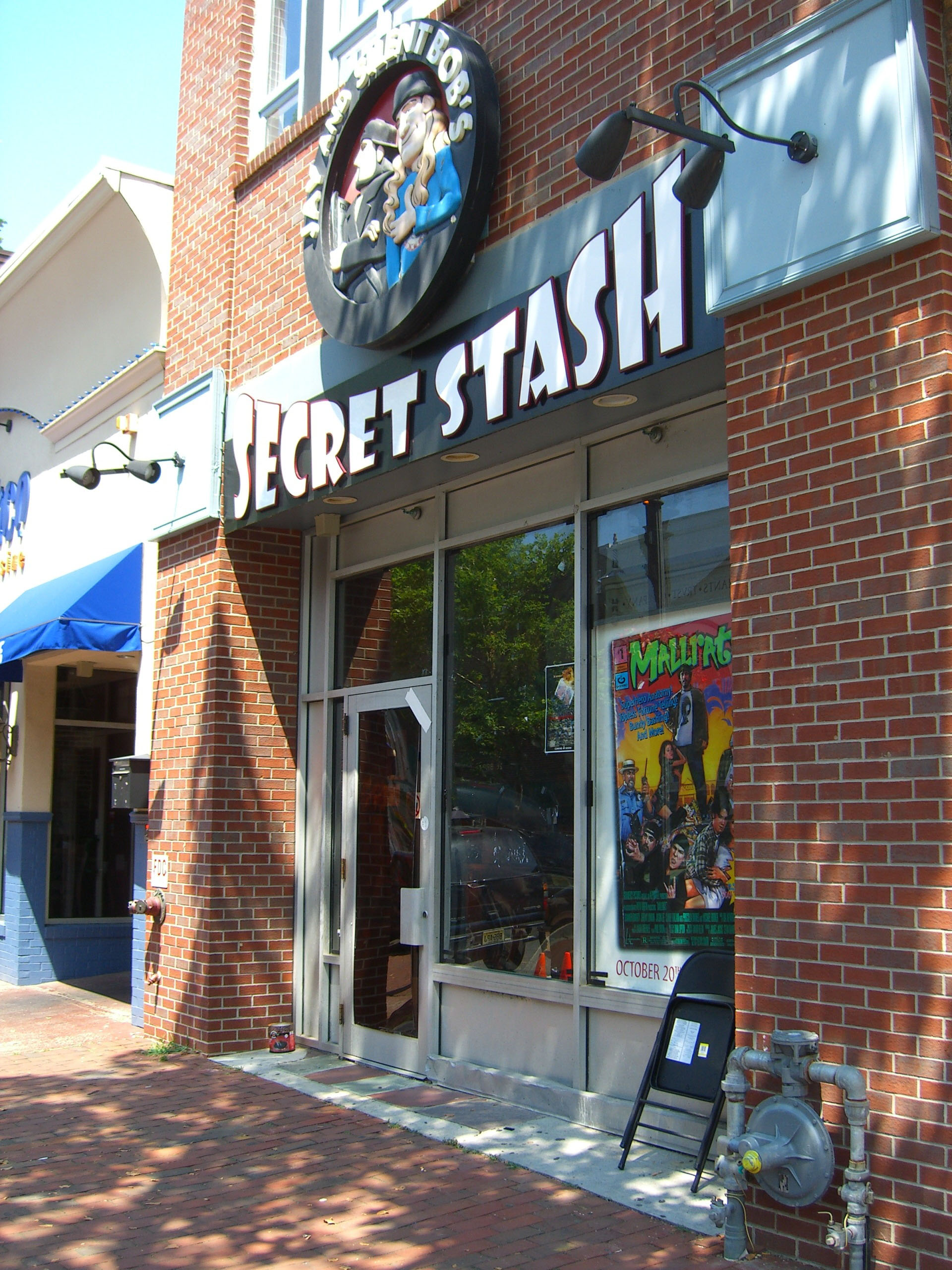
Jay and Silent Bob's Secret Stash on Broad Street. Tinted panels have been placed over the windows and door to block sunlight during filming of the reality TV series Comic Book Men.

Several tunes composed and/or made famous by Count Basie name-check the town in their title, including "Red Bank Boogie" and "The Kid from Red Bank". Basie was born and grew up in Red Bank, starting his musician's career there. A bronze bust of him was commissioned to mark what would have been his 100th birthday in 2004, and placed in the plaza outside the Red Bank train station.

In his 1942 essay "Memoirs of a Drudge", humorist James Thurber recalls being sent to Red Bank by his newspaper's city editor on a tip that "Violets [are] growing in the snow over in Red Bank". Putting in a telephone call to that town's Chief of Police in advance, Thurber is told by a desk sergeant, "Ain't no violence over here."

Some of the films of Kevin Smith, who lived in Red Bank while working as an up-and-coming director, are partially set there, including Chasing Amy, Dogma, and Jay and Silent Bob Strike Back. Smith's comic book store, Jay and Silent Bob's Secret Stash, the setting of the AMC reality television series Comic Book Men, is also in Red Bank, at 65 Broad Street. Smith and View Askew Productions also host the annual Vulgarthon film marathon in various theaters around Red Bank.

== Notable people ==
People who were born in, residents of, or otherwise closely associated with Red Bank include: ((B) denotes that the person was born there.)

- Mimi Alford (born 1943), woman who served as an intern in the White House press office from 1962 to 1963, during which time she had an affair with President John F. Kennedy described in her 2012 book Once Upon a Secret
- Chester Apy (1932–2021), politician who represented District 5B in the New Jersey General Assembly from 1968 to 1970 and again from 1972 to 1974(B)
- Michael Arnone (1932–2024), politician who served in the New Jersey General Assembly from 1989 to 2004, representing New Jersey's 12th legislative district, after serving as Red Bank's mayor in 1979 and 1980
- Daniel V. Asay (1847–1930), iceboat racer
- James Avati (1912–2005), illustrator and paperback cover artist
- Frances Blaisdell (1912–2009), award-winning, pioneering flutist and educator first female soloist with the New York Philharmonic
- Sebastian Bach (born 1968), former lead singer of hard rock band Skid Row
- Count Basie (1904–1984), jazz pianist and bandleader The Neal Hefti tune featured in The Atomic Mr. Basie album, "The Kid from Red Bank," refers to him.
- Virginia Bauer (born 1956), advocate for families of the victims of the September 11 terror attacks who is a commissioner of the Port Authority of New York and New Jersey
- Jennifer Beck (born 1967), politician who represents New Jersey's 12th legislative district in the New Jersey Senate, and served in the New Jersey General Assembly from 2006 to 2008
- Clint Black (born 1962), country music singer-songwriter, record producer, multi-instrumentalist and occasional actor
- Dave Bry (1970–2017), writer, music journalist and editor at Vibe, Spin and XXL
- Michael Callahan (born 1987), soccer player
- Pete Capella (born 1977), actor and voice actor best known for his voice role as Silver the Hedgehog in the Sonic the Hedgehog games
- William J. Chiego (born 1943), museum curator who has been director of the McNay Art Museum in San Antonio since 1991
- Edmund S. Crelin Jr. (1923–2004), professor emeritus of anatomy at Yale University
- Sean Dawkins (born 1971), wide receiver who played for the Indianapolis Colts, New Orleans Saints, Seattle Seahawks and Jacksonville Jaguars
- David DeFazio (born 1983), American ice dancer who represents Switzerland in international competition
- Peter Dobson (born 1964), actor who had a cameo as Elvis Presley in Forrest Gump
- Sigmund Eisner (1859–1925), clothing manufacturer and president of the Sigmund Eisner Company
- Sigmund Eisner (1920–2012), scholar of medieval literature who was an expert on Geoffrey Chaucer
- Abram Isaac Elkus (1867–1947), lawyer who served as U.S. ambassador to the Ottoman Empire
- Brian Fallon (born 1980), guitarist, songwriter, singer and bandleader of The Gaslight Anthem
- John Farinacci (born 2001), ice hockey forward for the Providence Bruins of the American Hockey League
- Harry Flaherty (born 1961), linebacker who played for the Dallas Cowboys(B)
- Timothy Thomas Fortune (1856–1928), orator, civil rights leader, journalist and founder of The New York Age, editor and publisher; his Red Bank home, Maple Hill, is on the National Register of Historic Places
- Josh Heald (born 1977), screenwriter, director, and producer best known for his work on Cobra Kai and Hot Tub Time Machine(B)
- Eddie Jones (1929-1997), longtime bass player for Count Basie
- Jake Kalish (born 1991), professional baseball pitcher(B)
- Blair Kamin, Pulitzer Prize-winning architecture critic(B)
- Mike Largey (born 1960), professional basketball player who played power forward for Hapoel Tel Aviv B.C. of the Israeli Basketball Premier League from 1984 to 1987
- Joseph A. Laroski (born 1971), lawyer, who is a nominee to serve as a United States judge of the United States Court of International Trade(B)
- Marilyn Levy (1922–2014), photographic chemist and inventor based at Fort Monmouth
- Chris Lieto (born 1972), international triathlete who finished second at the Ironman Hawaii 2009
- Phil Longo (born 1968), football coach who is offensive coordinator and quarterbacks coach for the North Carolina Tar Heels football team(B)
- Pamela Malhotra (born 1952), won India's highest award for women after starting an animal sanctuary
- Tom Malloy (born 1974), film actor, writer and producer(B)
- Danielle Marcano (born 1997), professional soccer forward, who plays in the Turkish Women's Football Super League for Fomget Gençlik ve Spor and represents Puerto Rico internationally(B)
- Leo Massa (1929–2009), cross-country skier who competed in the men's 30 kilometre event at the 1960 Winter Olympics
- John Joseph McDermott (born 1963), priest of the Catholic Church who was appointed as bishop for the Diocese of Burlington in 2024(B)
- Eric McCoo (born 1980), former NFL running back(B)
- Sarah Mergenthaler (born 1979), member of the 2008 US Olympic Sailing Team who competed in the women's 470(B)
- Christian Miele (born 1981), politician who has been a member of the Maryland House of Delegates since 2015
- Daniel J. O'Hern (1930–2009), former associate justice of the New Jersey Supreme Court who served as councilman and mayor of Red Bank
- Michael J. Panter (born 1969), politician who represented New Jersey's 12th legislative district in the New Jersey General Assembly from 2004 to 2008
- Haley Peters (born 1992), professional women's basketball forward with the Connecticut Sun of the Women's National Basketball Association
- Frederik Pohl (1919–2013), science fiction author
- Elise Primavera (born 1955), children's author and illustrator
- Donny Pritzlaff (born 1979), freestyle wrestler who represented the United States in international competition, winning bronze medals at the 2006 World Wrestling Championships and the 2007 FILA Wrestling World Cup
- Bob Rommel (born 1962), politician who has served in the Florida House of Representatives from the 106th district since 2016
- Phoebe Ryan (born 1990), singer and songwriter
- David Sancious (born 1953), early member of the E Street Band
- Natalie Schafer (1900–1991), actress who played Mrs. Thurston Howell III on the TV series Gilligan's Island
- Eddie August Schneider (1911–1940), pilot who set airspeed records
- Michael A. Sheehan (1955–2018), author, government official and military officer(B)
- Sheridan Shook (died 1899), businessman and tax collector(B)
- Garrett Sickels (born 1994), outside linebacker who played for the Los Angeles Rams(B)
- Harley Quinn Smith (born 1999), actress and musician(B)
- Kevin Smith (born 1970), film director who has shot films in Red Bank(B)
- Abigail Spanberger (born 1979), federal law enforcement agent, former CIA operations officer and U.S. representative from Virginia's 7th congressional district, 75th Governor of Virginia
- Snuffy Stirnweiss (1918–1958), second baseman who played for the New York Yankees
- Frankie Tagliaferri (born 1999), professional soccer player who plays as a midfielder for the North Carolina Courage in the National Women's Soccer League(B)
- Edmund Wilson (1895–1972), literary critic(B)
- David Wojnarowicz (1954–1992), painter, photographer, writer, filmmaker, performance artist and AIDS activist
- Alexander Woollcott (1887–1943), writer and critic born at the nearby North American Phalanx utopian community
- Dave Wyndorf (born 1956), songwriter, guitarist, singer and Monster Magnet bandleader
- Christopher Young (born 1958), composer and orchestrator of film and television scores(B)
