= K. Hovnanian Children's Hospital =

- Hackensack Meridian Health

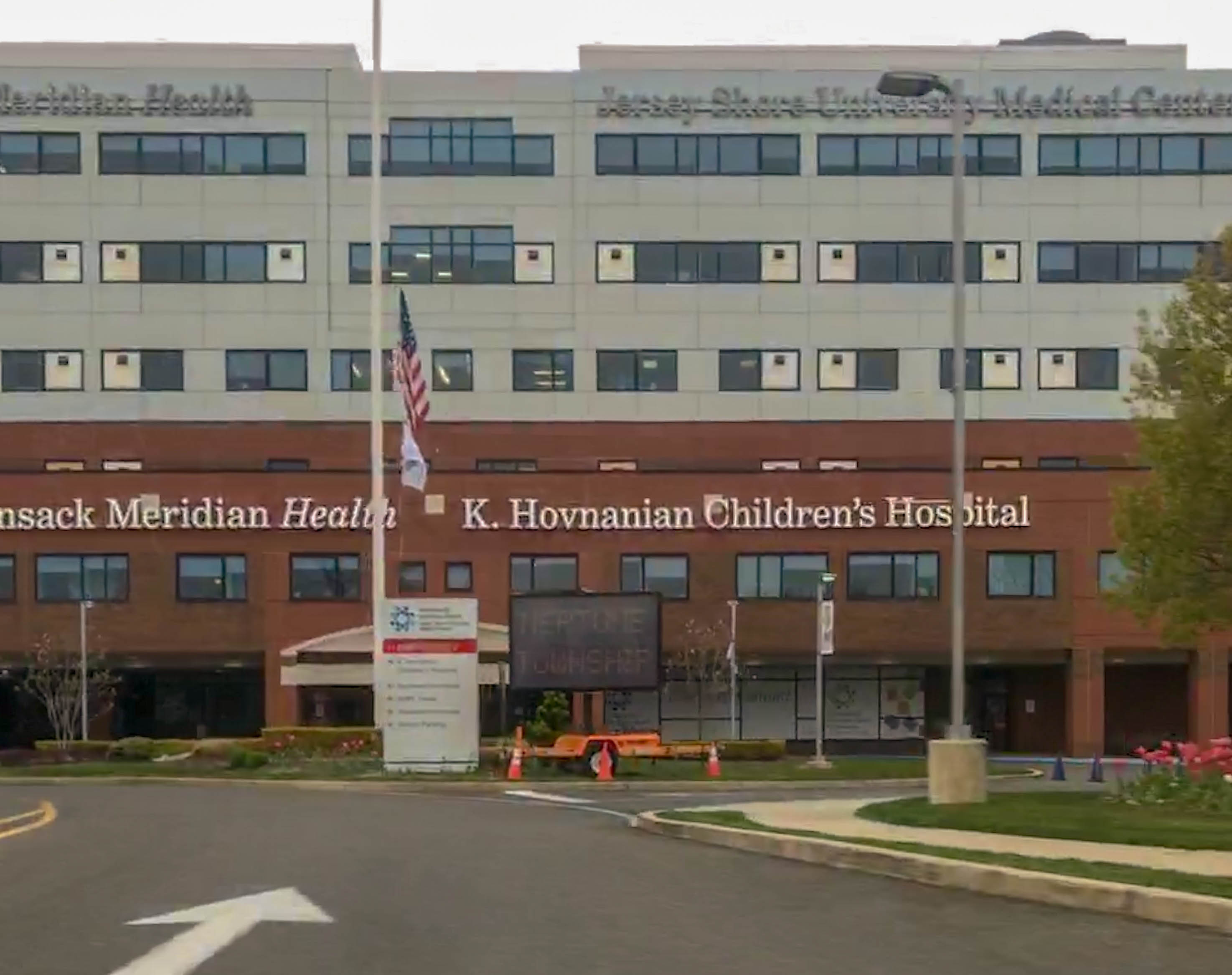

Geography
- Location: 1945 Route 33; Neptune Township, New Jersey, United States
- Coordinates: 40.208009°N 74.041708°W

Organization
- Type: Children's hospital
- Affiliated university: Hackensack Meridian School of Medicine
- Network: Hackensack Meridian Health

Services
- Emergency department: Level I Pediatric Trauma Center
- Beds: 88

Helipads
- Helipad: FAA LID: NJ05 (Shared with Jersey Shore University Medical Center

Links
- Website: www.khovnanianchildrenshospital.com
- Lists: Hospitals in New Jersey

Childbirth and Maternity Center at Riverview Medical Center ran by K. Hovnanian Children's Hospital

The K. Hovnanian Children's Hospital (KHCH) at Jersey Shore University Medical Center is a pediatric acute care hospital located in Neptune Township, New Jersey. The hospital has 88 beds and provides comprehensive pediatric specialties and subspecialties to infants, children, teens, and young adults aged 0–21 throughout Coastal New Jersey. It is affiliated with both the Hackensack Meridian School of Medicine and Robert Wood Johnson Medical School, and is a member of Hackensack Meridian Health. KHCH features the only level I pediatric trauma center in the state and one of a handful of pediatric trauma centers in the state (the other's being level II). KHCH also partners with Ocean Medical Center, Riverview Medical Center, Southern Ocean Medical Center, and Bayshore Medical Center to provide pediatric care to the entire surrounding region of Hackensack Meridian Health hospitals.

== About ==
In 2006, the hospital became the first hospital in the Jersey Shore region to be designated as a children's hospital by the state.

In 2008, the hospital added a teen lounge, a new nurses station, additional pediatric rooms, and updated designs and architecture throughout.

KHCH was named after builder Kevork Hovnanian after his foundation contributed the "largest donation the hospital had seen in its 101 year history." The hospital features an ACS regional pediatric trauma center, 1 of 3 in New Jersey and the only in the region. The hospital also has an AAP verified level 3 neonatal intensive care unit, the highest in the Jersey Shore region.

In 2012 and 2017, it was listed as a Nurse Magnet hospital by the ANCC. In 2019, the hospital received the prestigious International Board Certified Lactation Consultant certification and provides a location for mothers to breastfeed. In 2020, the hospital ranked #44 nationally in the field of Pediatric Cancer by U.S. News & World Report. In 2020–21, it ranked #42 nationally, and in 2021 it ranked in the top 50 nationally for pediatric cancer care.

In May 2019 administration of KHCH announced a renovation of the pediatric emergency department at the hospital. The renovations completed in June 2020, with upgrades including a better child-friendly environment with new signage and floors, warm and playful colors, colorful furnishings, and wall decals depicting outdoor scenes.

== Patient Care Units ==
The hospital offers a variety of settings for pediatric patients ranging from critical care to inpatient care to outpatient care.

- 10 - 12 bed pediatric emergency department
- 30 bed neonatal intensive care unit
- 10 bed pediatric intensive care unit
- 44 bed general pediatric inpatient unit

=== Services ===
KHCH offers over 50 pediatric services and sub-specialties to patients aged 0–21 throughout the Jersey Shore region.

- Pediatric Cancer Care
- Pediatric Emergency Department
- Pediatric Neurology
- Pediatric Nutrition and Gastroenterology
- Pediatric Orthopedics
- Pediatric Services
- Pediatric Surgical Services
- Pediatric Therapy
- Pediatric Urology

== See also ==
- List of children's hospitals in the United States
- Joseph M. Sanzari Children's Hospital
- Hackensack Meridian Health
- Bristol Myers Squibb Children's Hospital
