= List of hospitals in New Jersey =

This is a list of hospitals in the U.S. state of New Jersey, sorted by hospital name. As of 2014, there were 72 acute care hospitals in the state.

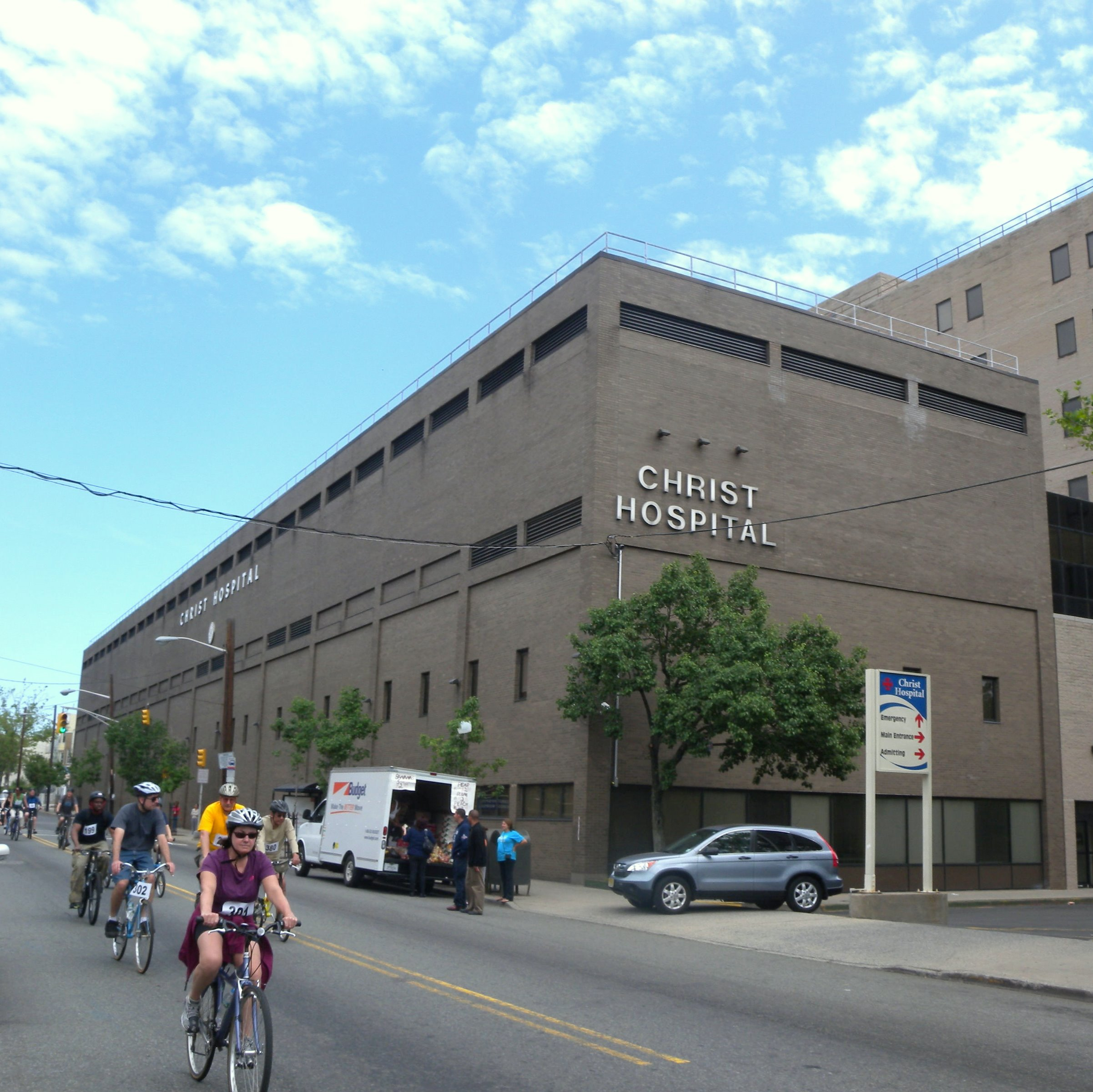
Christ Hospital, Jersey City in 2011

Hospital	County	Municipality
AcuteCare Health System - Specialty Hospital at Kimball	Ocean	Lakewood
Ancora Psychiatric Hospital	Camden	Ancora (Winslow Township)
Ann Klein Forensic Center	Mercer	Trenton
Astra Health Center	Hudson	Hoboken
Atlantic Rehabilitation Institute	Morris	Morristown
AtlantiCare Regional Medical Center, Atlantic City Campus	Atlantic	Atlantic City
AtlantiCare Regional Medical Center, Mainland Campus	Atlantic	Pomona
Bacharach Institute for Rehabilitation	Atlantic	Pomona
Bayonne Medical Center	Hudson	Bayonne
Bayshore Community Hospital	Monmouth	Holmdel
Bristol-Myers Squibb Children's Hospital	Middlesex	New Brunswick
Cape Regional Medical Center	Cape May	Cape May Court House
Capital Health System (Fuld Campus)	Mercer	Trenton
Capital Health System (Hopewell Campus)	Mercer	Hopewell Township
Care One at Raritan Bay Medical Center	Middlesex	Perth Amboy
Carrier Clinic	Somerset	Belle Mead
CentraState Healthcare System	Monmouth	Freehold
Chilton Memorial Hospital	Morris	Pompton Plains
Christ Hospital	Hudson	Jersey City
Christian Health Care Center	Bergen	Wyckoff
Clara Maass Medical Center	Essex	Belleville
Community Medical Center	Ocean	Toms River
Cooper University Hospital	Camden	Camden
Deborah Heart and Lung Center	Burlington	Browns Mills
East Mountain Hospital	Somerset	Belle Mead
East Orange General Hospital	Essex	East Orange
East Orange VA Medical Center	Essex	East Orange
Englewood Hospital and Medical Center	Bergen	Englewood
Essex County Hospital (not to be confused with Overbrook Asylum)	Essex	Cedar Grove
Greystone Park Psychiatric Hospital	Morris	Parsippany-Troy Hills
Hackensack University Medical Center	Bergen	Hackensack
Pascack Valley Medical Center	Bergen	Westwood
Hackettstown Medical Center	Warren	Hackettstown
Hampton Behavioral Health Center	Burlington	Westampton
HealthSouth - Rehabilitation Hospital of Toms River	Ocean	Toms River
HealthSouth - Specialty Hospital of Union	Union	Union
Hoboken University Medical Center (formerly St. Mary Hospital)	Hudson	Hoboken
Holy Name Medical Center	Bergen	Teaneck
Hudson County Meadowview Hospital	Hudson	Secaucus
Hunterdon Medical Center	Hunterdon	Flemington
Inspira Medical Center Mullica Hill	Gloucester	Mullica Hill
Inspira Medical Center Woodbury	Gloucester	Woodbury
Inspira Medical Center Vineland	Cumberland	Vineland
Inspira Medical Center Elmer	Salem	Elmer
Jefferson Cherry Hill Hospital (formerly Kennedy Health)	Camden	Cherry Hill
Jefferson Stratford Hospital (formerly Kennedy Health)	Camden	Stratford
Jefferson Washington Township Hospital (formerly Kennedy Health)	Gloucester	Washington Township
Jersey City Medical Center	Hudson	Jersey City
Jersey Shore University Medical Center	Monmouth	Neptune Township
JFK Johnson Rehabilitation Institute	Middlesex	Edison
JFK Medical Center	Middlesex	Edison
Kessler Institute for Rehabilitation	Morris	Chester Township
Kessler Institute for Rehabilitation	Bergen	Saddle Brook
Kessler Institute for Rehabilitation	Essex	West Orange
Kindred Hospital at Wayne	Passaic	Wayne
Kindred Hospital at Morris	Morris	Dover
Kindred Hospital at Rahway	Union	Rahway
Meadowlands Hospital Medical Center	Hudson	Secaucus
Meadowview Psychiatric Hospital	Hudson	Secaucus
Lourdes Medical Center of Burlington County	Burlington	Willingboro
Lourdes Specialty Hospital	Burlington	Willingboro
Lyons VA Medical Center	Somerset	Lyons
Marlton Rehabilitation Hospital	Burlington	Marlton
Matheny Medical and Educational Center	Somerset	Peapack
Monmouth Medical Center	Monmouth	Long Branch
Monmouth Medical Center Southern Campus (formerly Kimball Medical Center)	Ocean	Lakewood
Morristown Medical Center	Morris	Morristown
Mountainside Hospital	Essex	Glen Ridge
New Bridge Medical Center	Bergen	Paramus
Newark Beth Israel Medical Center	Essex	Newark
Newton Medical Center	Sussex	Newton
Ocean Medical Center	Ocean	Brick
Overlook Medical Center	Union	Summit
Palisades Medical Center	Hudson	North Bergen
PSE&G Children's Specialized Hospital	Middlesex	New Brunswick
Penn Medicine Princeton Medical Center	Middlesex	Plainsboro
Raritan Bay Medical Center	Middlesex	Perth Amboy
Raritan Bay Medical Center, Old Bridge	Middlesex	Old Bridge
Rehabilitation Hospital of South Jersey	Cumberland	Vineland
The Rehabilitation Hospital of Tinton Falls	Monmouth	Tinton Falls
The Memorial Hospital of Salem County	Salem	Salem
Riverview Medical Center	Monmouth	Red Bank
Robert Wood Johnson University Hospital	Middlesex	New Brunswick
Robert Wood Johnson University Hospital Somerset	Somerset	Somerville
Robert Wood Johnson University Hospital at Rahway	Union	Rahway
Robert Wood Johnson University Hospital at Hamilton	Mercer	Hamilton
Rutgers - University Behavioral HealthCare	Middlesex	Piscataway
Runnells Specialized Hospital	Union	Berkeley Heights
Saint Barnabas Behavioral Health Center	Ocean	Toms River
Saint Barnabas Medical Center	Essex	Livingston
Saint Clare's Hospital at Boonton Township	Morris	Boonton
Saint Clare's Hospital at Denville	Morris	Denville
Saint Clare's Hospital at Dover	Morris	Dover
Saint Clare's Hospital at Sussex	Sussex	Sussex
Saint Francis Medical Center	Hudson	Jersey City
Saint James Hospital (remains open for psychiatric services only)	Essex	Newark
Saint Michael's Medical Center	Essex	Newark
Saint Peter's University Hospital	Middlesex	New Brunswick
St. Francis Medical Center	Mercer	Trenton
St. Joseph's Regional Medical Center	Passaic	Paterson
St. Joseph's Wayne Hospital	Passaic	Wayne
St. Lawrence Rehabilitation Center	Mercer	Lawrenceville
St. Mary's Hospital	Passaic	Passaic
Select at Belleville	Essex	Belleville
Shore Memorial Hospital	Atlantic	Somers Point
Southern Ocean Medical Center	Ocean	Manahawkin
Specialty Hospital at Monmouth	Monmouth	Long Branch
Summit Oaks Hospital	Union	Summit
Trenton Psychiatric Hospital	Mercer	West Trenton
Trinitas Hospital	Union	Elizabeth
University Hospital	Essex	Newark
The Valley Hospital	Bergen	Paramus
Virtua Mt. Holly (Memorial)	Burlington	Mount Holly
Virtua Berlin	Camden	Berlin
Virtua Marlton	Burlington	Marlton
Virtua Our Lady of Lourdes Medical Center	Camden	Camden
Virtua Voorhees	Camden	Voorhees
St. Luke's Warren Hospital	Warren	Phillipsburg
Weisman Children's Rehabilitation Hospital	Burlington	Marlton

== Former hospitals ==
- All Souls Hospital, Morristown (first general hospital in county established 1891, purchased 1973 by Morristown Memorial Hospital)
- Beacon, Jersey City (formerly Jersey City Medical Center)
- Barnert Hospital, Paterson
- Capital Health System (Mercer Campus), Trenton
- Essex County Hospital Center, Cedar Grove (formerly known as Overbrook Asylum) New Essex County Hospital built on Fairview Ave, Cedar Grove
- Irvington General Hospital, Irvington
- Kenney Memorial Hospital (closed 1953)
- Marlboro Psychiatric Hospital, Marlboro (demolished 2015)
- Montclair Community Hospital, Montclair (closed 1999, property now town houses)
- Muhlenberg Regional Medical Center, Plainfield (closed 2008)
- Northern Community Hospital, Oradell (see Riverdell Hospital)
- North Hudson Hospital, Weehawken
- Orange General Hospital, Orange (a/k/a Hospital Center at Orange)
- Pascack Valley Hospital, Westwood (now Hackensack University Medical Center North at Pascack Valley)
- PBI Regional Medical Center, Passaic (now St. Mary's Hospital - Passaic)
- Raritan Valley Hospital, Green Brook, New Jersey
- Riverdell Hospital, Oradell (closed 1981, demolished 1984)
- Senator Garrett W. Hagedorn Psychiatric Hospital, Lebanon Township
- South Amboy Medical Center, South Amboy (now medical offices)
- Union Hospital, Union (remains open as a satellite emergency department "SLED")
- United Hospital Medical Center, Newark (demolished 2015)
- United Children's Medical Center, Newark (demolished 2015)
- William B. Kessler Memorial Hospital, Hammonton (ER is still in operation via AtlantiCare, however, the rest of the hospital is closed and for sale)
