= Ocean Medical Center =

Coordinates: 40.076892°N 74.1340607°W

Ocean University Medical Center
- Hackensack Meridian Health

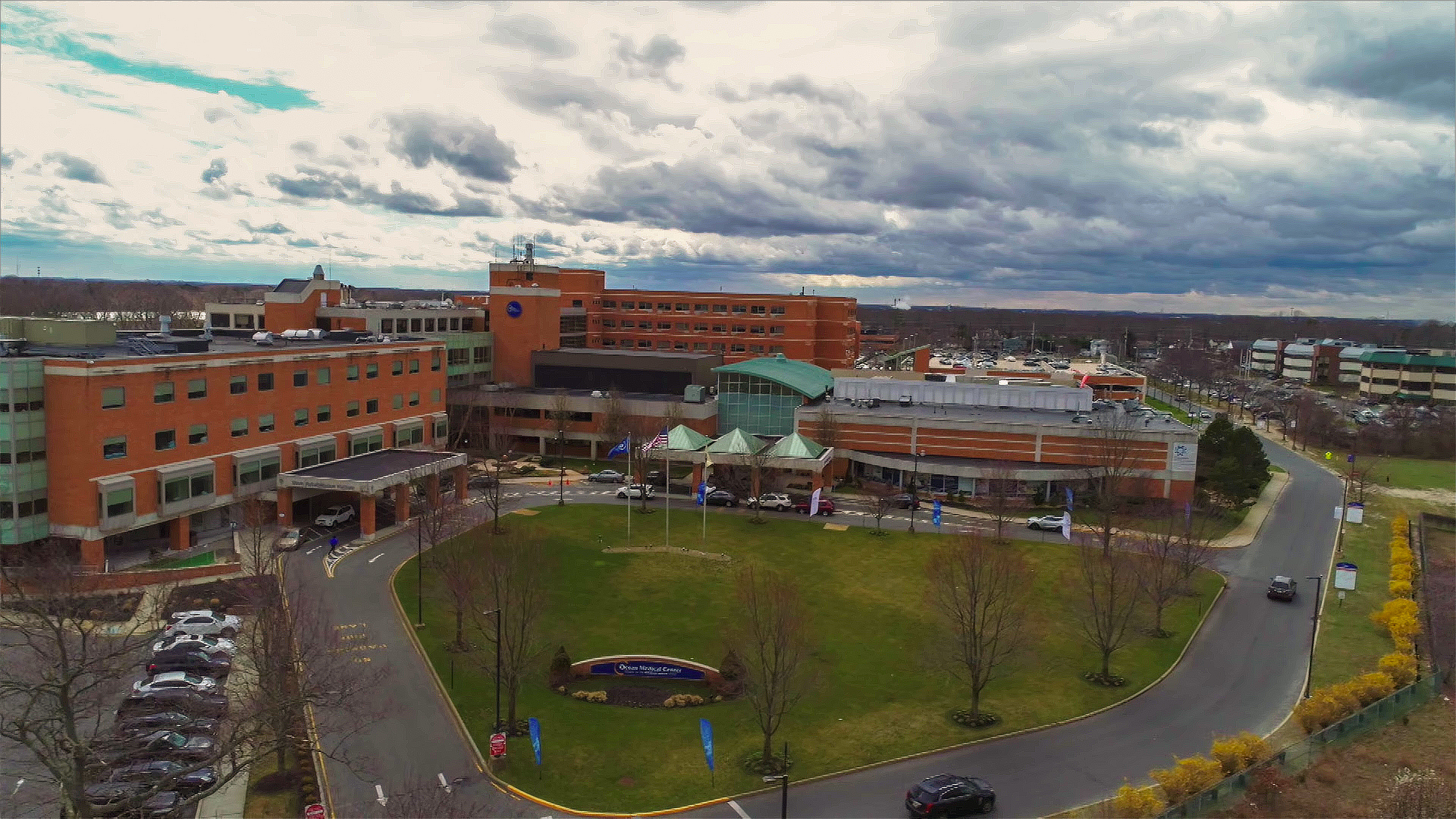

Geography
- Location: 425 Jack Martin Boulevard; Brick, New Jersey, U.S.

Organisation
- Type: Short term acute care
- Affiliated university: Hackensack Meridian School of Medicine

Services
- Emergency department: Yes
- Beds: 318

History
- Former names: Point Pleasant Hospital, Ocean Medical Center
- Founded: 1984

Links
- Website: Website

Ocean University Medical Center (OUMC), formerly Ocean Medical Center, is a 318-bed non-profit, short-term acute care teaching hospital located in Brick, Ocean County, New Jersey, providing tertiary and healthcare needs for the northern Jersey Shore and Central Jersey.

The university as of 2021 has 90 residents and five medical programs.

OUMC is part of the Hackensack Meridian Health Health System and is affiliated with the Robert Wood Johnson Medical School of Rutgers University. Pediatric patients are under the care of doctors from K. Hovnanian Children's Hospital, and high-risk pediatric cases are transferred to the hospital. In 2021 it was given a grade A by the Leapfrog patient safety organization. In 2021 U.S. News ranked it among the 15 best maternity hospitals in New Jersey.

== History ==
Ocean University Medical Center began as Point Pleasant Hospital in 1918 as a four-room facility in the Point Pleasant Beach home of Dr. Frank Denniston, and by the late 1920s expanded to a 16-bed building. It continued to expand and become the largest hospital in the region.

In 1982, Point Pleasant Hospital changed its name to Northern Ocean Hospital System. The establishment of Brick Hospital began as grassroots movement in the 1960s. Construction began in 1982 and opened in 1984 with 120 beds. In 1987, the Northern Ocean Hospital System changed its name to Medical Center of Ocean County, comprising Point Pleasant Hospital and Brick Hospital.

When Point Pleasant Hospital closed, it became a standalone emergency department. The Brick Township and Point Pleasant facilities merged with the Jersey Shore Medical Center in Neptune and Riverview Medical Center in Red Bank on January 1, 1997, into Meridian Health.

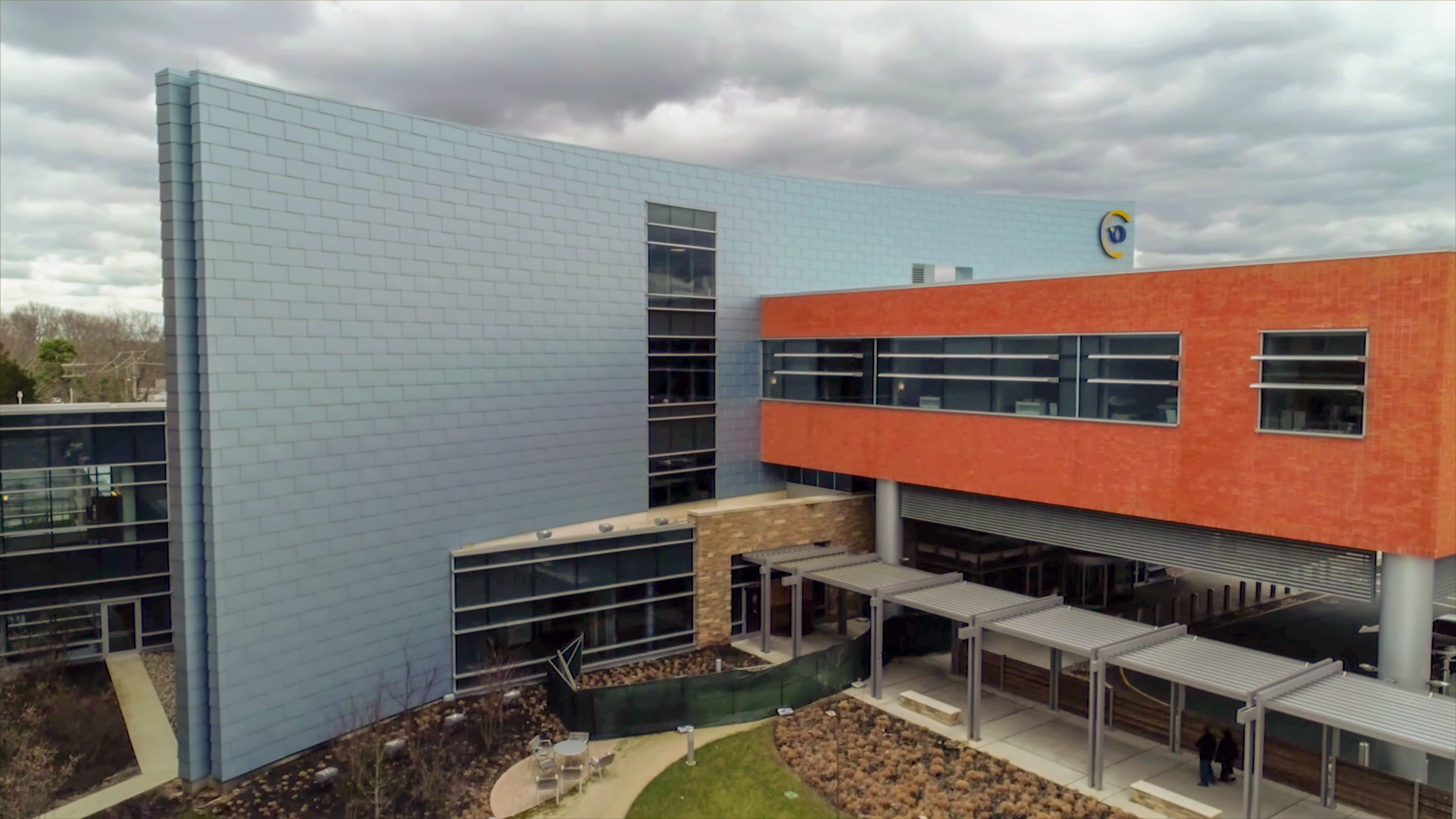
The new pavilion at Ocean Medical Center.

In 2013, it began an $82 million expansion project to substantially increase the capacity of its emergency room facilities and add additional basement and third floor space, funded in part by a $5 million donation from the family of Jirair Hovnanian. It was completed in March, 2014. The new emergency room contained 49 new emergency beds and a dedicated pediatric emergency area. In 2016, it opened its cancer center and in 2017, new surgical suites, as well as a "zen room" near the nurses' station where employees could break away from the work environment.

In 2019, the institution started new construction on a heart and vascular center to combine heart and vascular services on one floor. Also that year, Ocean Medical Center greatly expanded its pharmacy to include all needed medical products and to be a "one stop shop" for patients and the public. Its name was changed to Ocean University Medical Center in 2021.

== Services ==
OUMC provides Bariatric Surgery, Cancer Care, Critical Care, a CyberKnife Center, The da Vinci Surgical System, a Dialysis Center, Emergency Department, Incontinence Center, Laboratory Services, Laparoscopic Gastric Banding (LAP-Band), Maternity, Orthopedics, Palliative Care, Pediatrics, Physical Therapy, Rehabilitation Services, Same Day Surgery, Sleep Medicine, Surgical Services, Thoracic Surgery, Urologic Surgery, and Vascular Surgery.

== Rankings and reviews ==
In 2020, the hospital was rated High Performing by U.S. News & World Report for treatment of colon cancer, COPD, and heart failure.

Also in 2020 in U.S. News & World Report, Ocean Medical Center tied with Our Lady of Lourdes Medical Center, Penn Medicine Princeton Medical Center, Jefferson Health-Stratford, and Overlook Medical Center as #11 best in New Jersey. The hospital is also recognized in Southern Jersey for its advanced medical care.

The Human Rights Campaign ranked the hospital as one of the best in the state for treating LGBTQ patients.

The Leapfrog Group gave the hospital an "A" rating as teaching hospital in 2019. The Leapfrog group also named this hospital along with Jersey Shore University Medical Center as "top teaching hospitals nationally."

Ocean Medical received acknowledgment in the American Nurses Credentialing Center Magnet Recognition Program.

In 2021 it was listed one of New Jersey's best 15 hospitals for maternity care.

== University Teaching Hospital ==
Ocean University Medical Center offers medical residencies for physicians in Internal Medicine (45 residents), Family Medicine (24 residents), Psychiatry (32 residents) and a Transitional year program, all of which are fully accredited. Fellowships include Sleep Medicine and Forensic Psychiatry.

Medical Students from HMSOM, RWJ Medical School and Rowan-Virtua SOM rotate with the residents and attending physicians at OUMC.

OUMC also offers PGY1 Pharmacy post graduate training as well.

== See also ==
- List of hospitals in New Jersey
- K. Hovnanian Children's Hospital
- Jersey Shore University Medical Center
- Hackensack Meridian Health
