= Raritan Bay Medical Center =

Coordinates: 40.3837°N 74.3240°W

- Hackensack Meridian Health

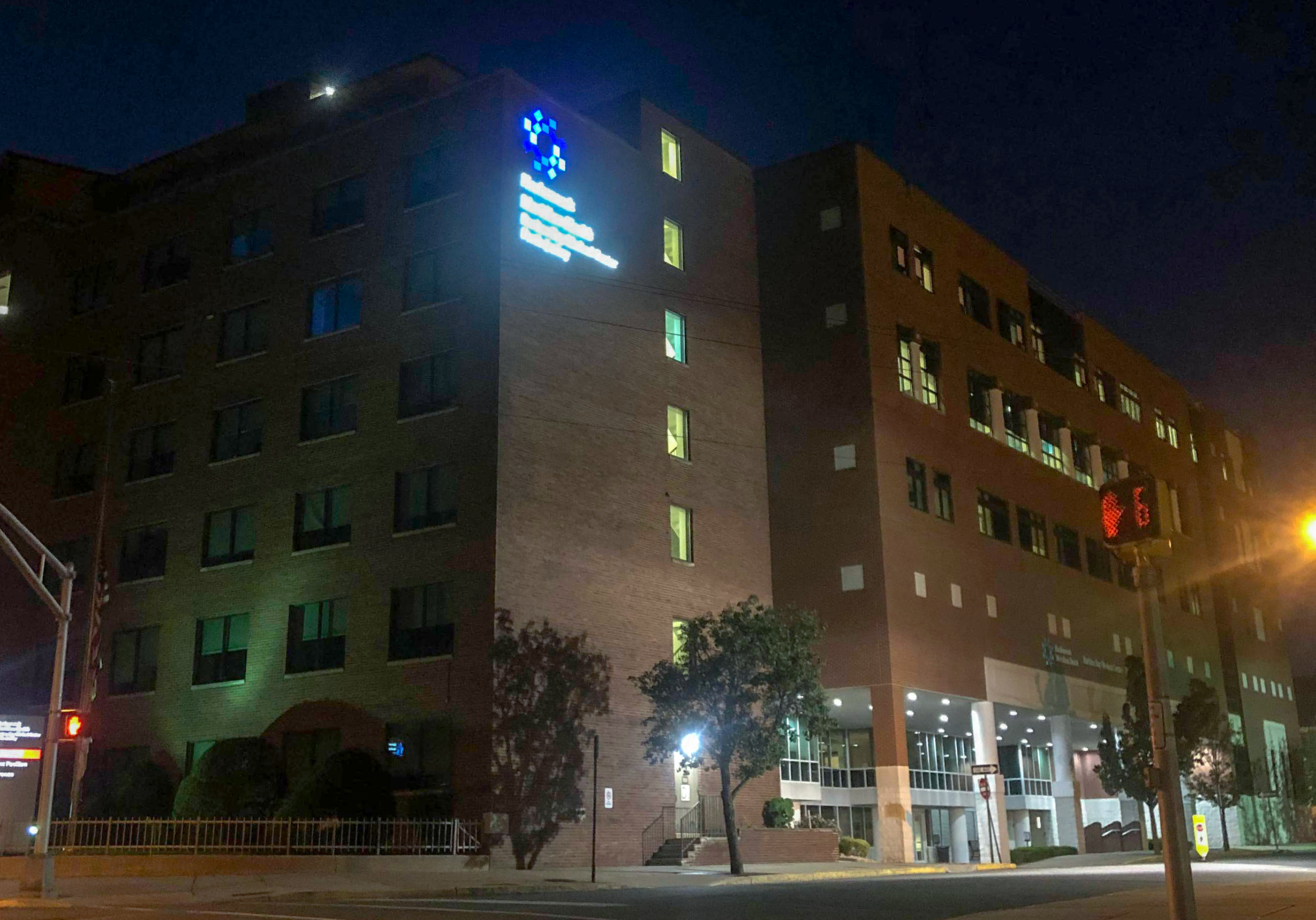
- A picture of the Perth Amboy campus of Raritan Bay Medical Center.

Geography
- Location: Old Bridge, New Jersey, U.S. Perth Amboy, New Jersey, U.S.

Organisation
- Funding: Non-profit hospital
- Type: Teaching
- Affiliated university: Robert Wood Johnson Medical School, Rutgers University

Services
- Emergency department: Yes
- Beds: 508

History
- Opened: 1902

Links
- Website: www.rbmc.org

Raritan Bay Medical Center (RBMC) consists of two general acute care hospitals, located within the heart of the Raritan Valley Region, servicing the Raritan Bayshore communities in Middlesex and Monmouth counties. The hospitals are located in Old Bridge (113 bed) and Perth Amboy (365 bed); both are non-profit, academic medical centers servicing the Central Jersey area. RBMC was purchased by Meridian Health System in 2014, and is now a part of the Hackensack Meridian Healthcare network.

== History ==
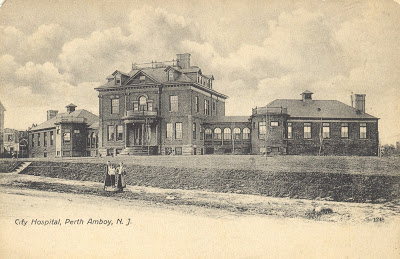
Perth Amboy City Hospital, circa 1902, forerunner of Raritan Bay Medical Center

The Raritan Bay Medical Center history dates to March 9, 1887, when the Perth Amboy Hospital Association filed papers with the state to build a hospital. Capital shortage delayed the eventual building of the hospital. In 1889 the Women's Hospital Guild was unable to raise the $6000 needed to buy a property on Gordon Street as a site for the hospital. It was not until 1900 that land was obtained for the hospital, when Cortland Parker offered 6 lots on New Brunswick Turnpike. The hospital was dedicated on Memorial Day, 1901. The $15,000 Perth Amboy City Hospital was opened in 1902 with 12 beds and six doctors. In 1903, the School of Nursing opened. The name was changed to Perth Amboy General Hospital in 1929, and more recently to Raritan Bay Medical Center. Growth had been sustained until the 2010s, when it had to cut back.

=== Timeline ===
- 1907: 10 employees and 240 patients
- 1912: first births
- 1928: 62 employees, 2579 admissions and 252 babies born
- 1947: 271 bed hospital
- 1978: Old Bridge Regional Hospital was opened as part of the health service corporation

=== Merger with Hackensack Meridian Health ===
In the 2010s the hospital was caught in a downward financial spiral. A 2013 review showed RBMC operated at a loss and had a debt of $36 million. RBMC could not keep up with the newer insurance models, charity care and the funding of an employee pension plan. 75% of its patients had either Medicare or Medicaid, each having lower reimbursements than commercial insurance. The hospital had to put off capital projects needed to remain competitive. The solution was consolidation with a larger organization to make up for lack of scale. After a five-year search for a partner, and what was described as "a very challenging past for a variety of reasons," RBMC merged with Hackensack Meridian Health in early 2016. Preserving RBMC was welcomed by Perth Amboy city officials. Former Mayor Wilda Diaz stated: "Their presence in this city not only impacts the health and welfare of our residents, but they also employ approximately 1,200 people, making it the largest employer in the City of Perth Amboy and an integral part of our community." This consolidation was part of a statewide pattern of hospital consolidation; as of February, 2020, of 70 previously independent hospitals in New Jersey only 10 remained so.

== About ==
RBMC has over 500 beds in its two hospitals with a staff of over 500 physicians. It is a "major clinical affiliate" of the Robert Wood Johnson Medical School at Rutgers University. In addition to the hospitals, at the Medical Pavilion in Woodbridge RBMC provides outpatient services for cardiology, obstetrics/gynecology and physical therapy, and maintains an urgent care center. According to U.S. News & World Report, in 2021 it ranks among New Jersey's top 15 hospitals for maternity care.

== See also ==
- Bayshore Medical Center
- CentraState Medical Center
- Hackensack Meridian Health
- Jersey Shore University Medical Center
- Robert Wood Johnson Medical School
