= Mountainside =

Mountainside may refer to:

- the side of a mountain
- Mountainside, New Jersey, a borough
- Mountainside, a community in the city of Burlington, Ontario, Canada
- Mountainside Hospital, Glen Ridge, New Jersey
