= Genevieve Neal-Perry =

- Born: 1966 (age 59–60); Newark, New Jersey, USA

Academic background
- Education: BS, Biology, Dartmouth College; MD, 1998, University of Medicine and Dentistry of New Jersey; PhD, Neuropharmacology, 1998, Robert Wood Johnson Medical School

Genevieve Scott Neal-Perry (born 1966) is an American reproductive endocrinologist. She is the Robert A. Ross Distinguished Professor and Chair of Obstetrics and Gynecology at the UNC School of Medicine.

== Early life and education ==
Neal-Perry was born in 1966 in Newark, New Jersey. Upon graduating from high school, she became the first in her family to graduate college when she earned her Bachelor of Science degree in biology from Dartmouth College. Following this, she completed her medical degree and PhD in Neuropharmacology from the Robert Wood Johnson Medical School and finished her medical residency at Beth Israel Medical Center.

== Career ==
Upon completing her residency and fellowship training in reproductive endocrinology and infertility, Neal-Perry accepted a faculty position at Albert Einstein College of Medicine. In 2001, she became a member of the Endocrine Society and served on the Special Programs Committee, the Research Affairs Core Committee, and the ENDO Editorial Board. She was eventually recruited to join the University of Washington's (UW) Department of OB/GYN by Drs. Robert Steiner and David Eschenbach in 2015.

In November 2019, it was announced that Neal-Perry would leave UW to become the Chair of the UNC School of Medicine Department of Obstetrics and Gynecology in April 2020. Prior to joining the department, she was recognized by the science blog Crosstalk as one of the 100 inspiring black scientists in America.

== Awards ==
During her residency at the Albert Einstein College of Medicine, Neal-Perry received the Elliot D. Blumenthal Senior Resident Research Award, Excellence in Medical Student Teacher as a Resident Award and Special Excellence in Endoscopic Procedures Award.
