= Robert Wood Johnson Medical School =

Public medical school in New Jersey, US

Coordinates: 40.49461°N 74.45065°W

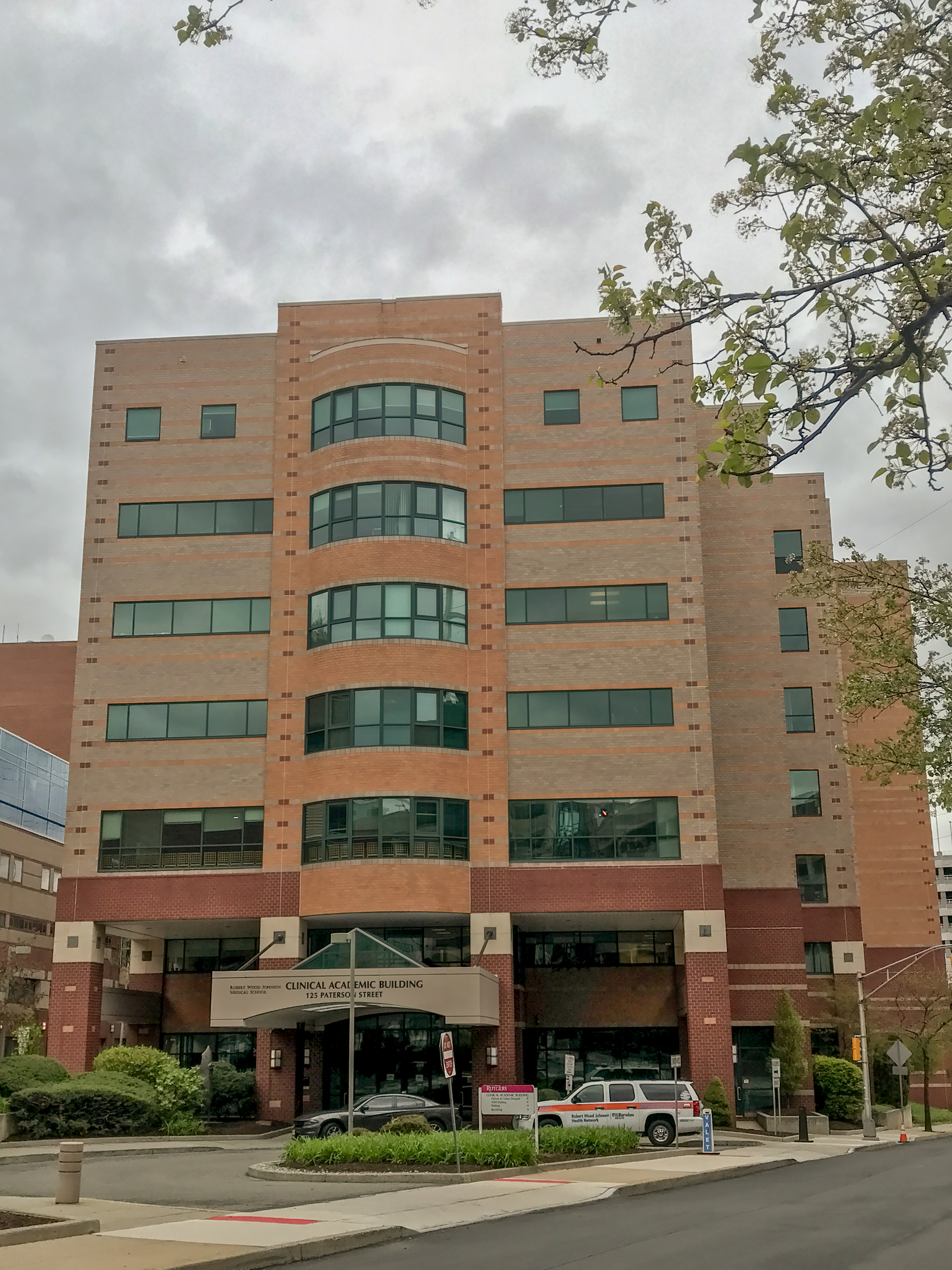
- Type: Public
- Established: 1962
- Parent institution: Rutgers University
- Dean: Amy Murtha
- Academic staff: 2,530
- Students: 560 MD, 130 PhD, 40 MD/PhD
- Other students: 450 (residents and interns)
- Location: New Brunswick, New Jersey, U.S.
- Campus: Urban
- Website: https://rwjms.rutgers.edu

Robert Wood Johnson Medical School is a medical school of Rutgers University. It is one of the two graduate medical schools of Rutgers Health, together with New Jersey Medical School, and is closely aligned with Robert Wood Johnson University Hospital, the medical school's principal affiliate.

Rutgers Robert Wood Johnson Medical School operates campuses in Piscataway and New Brunswick in New Jersey. The medical school includes 20 basic science and clinical departments and a broad range of clinical programs conducted at its 34 hospital affiliates and numerous ambulatory care sites in the region.

The school is named after Robert Wood Johnson II, the former president and chairman of the board of Johnson & Johnson. Prior to July 2013, Robert Wood Johnson Medical School was part of the University of Medicine and Dentistry of New Jersey (UMDNJ). In 2015-16 admissions cycle, the medical school has introduced the CASPer test, developed by McMaster University Medical School in Canada, as an admissions tool. As of the 2024-2025 admissions cycle, the medical school has introduced the PREview Exam, administered by the Association of American Medical Colleges, as an alternate Situational judgement test to CASPer.

== History ==
The first medical school in New Jersey was Seton Hall College of Medicine and Dentistry in Jersey City, which enrolled an inaugural class of 80 medical students for a 4-year M.D. program in 1956. After having received a donation from the Kellogg Foundation, Rutgers University initiated the development of a second medical school in New Jersey. In 1960, DeWitt Stetten, Jr. was named Dean of Rutgers Medical School (RMS) with the charge to create a 2-year program leading to the Master of Medical Science degree. Students would then have to complete their clinical training at universities with a clinical program. Enrollment started in 1962, the same year the Raritan Valley Hospital Association bought land in Green Brook Township, New Jersey to build a hospital. This 118-bed hospital, Raritan Valley Hospital, became operative in 1966 and would later be the initial primary teaching hospital for RMS.

With the passing of the Medical and Dental Education Act| of 1970, signed into law by Governor William T. Cahill on June 16, the College of Medicine and Dentistry of New Jersey (CMDNJ) was created, merging the New Jersey College of Medicine and Dentistry (NJCMD) - formerly the Seton Hall College of Medicine and Dentistry, and relocated to Newark, New Jersey - with the two-year medical school of Rutgers University in Piscataway, New Jersey. These were two separate medical schools under the direction of a single board of trustees and a single president. Stanley S. Bergen Jr. was the founding president. With the creation of CMDNJ, NJCMD adopted the name New Jersey Medical School, while RMS retained its name for the time being, although it was no longer part of Rutgers. In 1970, Raritan Valley Hospital was acquired by CMDNJ to serve as a future clinical teaching facility for RMS as it developed into a 4-year medical school. In 1972, RMS was accredited as a four-year M.D. degree-granting institution. The first students who graduated with an M.D. degree in 1974. With the growth of RMS, clinical education was expanded to other hospitals, primarily Middlesex General Hospital and Saint Peter's Hospital in New Brunswick, New Jersey. In 1977, an agreement was signed between RMS and Middlesex General Hospital, designating the hospital as the primary clinical affiliate. With the clinical focus at the New Brunswick hospitals, Raritan Valley Hospital was closed in 1981 and converted into a long-term care facility.. After the opening of the Clinical Academic Building (CAB) in New Brunswick in January 1995, the Dean's office moved from Piscataway to New Brunswick.

In 1981, legislation signed on December 10 by Governor Byrne established CMDNJ as the University of Medicine and Dentistry of New Jersey (UMDNJ). On July 1, 1986, RMS was renamed Robert Wood Johnson Medical School (RWJMS), and Middlesex General Hospital became Robert Wood Johnson University Hospital. RWJMS served as one of five regional campuses that constitute the UMDNJ health science institution.

On June 28, 2012, the New Jersey state legislature passed a bill that dissolved the University of Medicine and Dentistry of New Jersey and merged most of its schools, including New Jersey Medical School and RWJMS, with Rutgers University, forming a unit, effective July 1, 2013, that was initially called Rutgers Division of Biomedical and Health Sciences and ten years later renamed Rutgers Health.

== Statistics ==
The medical school has more than 2,450 full-time, part-time and volunteer faculty and 2,530 staff members. Approximately 757 medical students are enrolled at Robert Wood Johnson Medical School as well as 120 PhD students. The Class of 2017 has 134 students with 54% women and 53% native New Jersey residents. Robert Wood Johnson Medical School ranks among the top 10 percent nationally of medical schools in minority student enrollment. 42 percent of the student body are alumni of Rutgers University and 16 percent attended Ivy League colleges. Eighty percent had a single or double major in the biological or physical sciences, and four students were pre-accepted as members of the MD/PhD program.

Rutgers Robert Wood Johnson Medical School sponsors 49 programs in graduate medical education, 41 of which are accredited by the Accreditation Council on Graduate Medical Education (ACGME), five accredited by Specialty Boards or Societies and two without the option of accreditation. These include: anesthesia, family medicine, medicine, neurology, obstetrics/gynecology, pathology, pediatrics, psychiatry, radiology and surgery. There are 447 residents and fellows in programs accredited by the ACGME or the ABMS. There are four additional fellowships for which ACGME or ABMS accreditation is not available. Continuing medical education programs are conducted on a global basis.

== Patient Care ==
The medical school's faculty physicians provide clinical care as part of Rutgers Health and Rutgers Health Group. The school has more than 500 physician members and 200 clinical programs. Faculty physicians provide clinical care at numerous hospitals and ambulatory care sites throughout the state.

The Eric B. Chandler Health Center, a federally qualified health center owned by the medical school, provides more than 60,000 patient encounters. It is the only family health center of its kind in New Jersey that is supported by a medical school and operated jointly with a community board.

== Hospitals ==
=== Principal Hospital ===
- Robert Wood Johnson University Hospital - New Brunswick, NJ

=== University Hospitals ===
- Jersey Shore University Medical Center - Neptune, NJ
- Penn Medicine Princeton Medical Center - Plainsboro, NJ
- Saint Peter's University Hospital - New Brunswick, NJ

=== Major Clinical Affiliates ===
- Raritan Bay Medical Center - Old Bridge, NJ and Perth Amboy, NJ
- Robert Wood Johnson University Hospital Somerset - Somerset, New Jersey

=== Clinical Affiliates ===
- Bayshore Medical Center - Holmdel, NJ
- Bristol-Myers Squibb Children's Hospital - New Brunswick, NJ
- Capital Health Regional Medical Center - Trenton, NJ
- Carrier Clinic - Belle Mead, NJ
- CentraState Medical Center - Freehold, NJ
- Children's Specialized Hospital - New Brunswick, NJ
- Deborah Heart and Lung Center - Browns Mills, NJ
- Hunterdon Medical Center - Raritan, NJ
- JFK Medical Center - Edison, NJ
- Monmouth Medical Center - Long Branch, NJ
- Morristown Medical Center - Morristown, NJ
- Ocean Medical Center - Brick, NJ
- Overlook Medical Center - Summit, NJ
- Riverview Medical Center - Red Bank, NJ
- St. Francis Medical Center - Trenton, NJ
- St. Joseph's Regional Medical Center - Paterson, NJ
- University Behavioral Health Care - Piscataway, NJ
- VA New Jersey Health Care System, Lyons Campus - Lyons, NJ
- Virtua Memorial - Marlton, NJ
- Virtua Voorhees - Voorhees, NJ
- St. Luke's Warren - Phillipsburg, NJ

== Research ==
Robert Wood Johnson Medical School received $89 million in research grant awards in FY 2012. Of this amount, $50 million was from the National Institutes of Health. There is substantial strength within cancer, child health, neuroscience, and cell biology research programs.

=== Centers and Institutes ===
Robert Wood Johnson Medical School has approximately 85 affiliated centers and institutes. The major centers and institutes include:

- Cardiovascular Institute of New Jersey
- Rutgers Cancer Institute of New Jersey
- Child Health Institute of New Jersey
- Clinical Research Center
- Women's Health Institute
- Center for Advanced Biotechnology and Medicine

== List of deans ==
- DeWitt Stetten Jr., 1962-1970,
- R. Walter Schlesinger, 1970-1971 (acting)
- James W. Mackenzie, 1971-1975
- Harold Logan, 1975-1976 (interim)
- David J. Gocke, 1977-1978
- Richard C. Reynolds, 1979-1987
- Norman H. Edelman, 1988-1995
- Harold L. Paz, 1995-2006
- Peter S. Amenta, 2007-2014
- Sherine E. Gabriel, 2015-2018
- Robert L Johnson, 2019-2022
- Amy P. Murtha, 2022-present

== Accreditation ==
Robert Wood Johnson Medical School is accredited by the Liaison Committee on Medical Education of the Association of American Medical Colleges (AAMC) and the American Medical Association. The medical school is a full member of AAMC.

Robert Wood Johnson Medical School is accredited by the Commission on Higher Education of the Middle States Association of Colleges and Schools.

All education programs of Robert Wood Johnson Medical School have been approved by the academic, governmental and professional agencies with responsibilities in specific areas of specialization.

The primary and affiliated teaching hospitals of the medical school are accredited by The Joint Commission (JCAHO).
