= Marjorie Roloff Stetten =

American biochemist

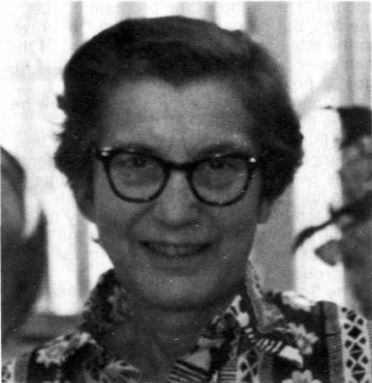
- Born: 1915; New York City, US
- Died: May 19, 1983
- Education: Douglass Residential College; Columbia University
- Spouse: DeWitt Stetten Jr.
- Children: 4
- Scientific career
- Fields: Biochemistry
- Workplaces: National Institutes of Health; Rutgers Medical School
- Thesis: The metabolism of l(-)-pioIihe studied with the aid of deuterium and isotopic nitrogen (1944)
- Doctoral advisor: Rudolph Schoenheimer

Marjorie Roloff Stetten (née Roloff; 1915 − May 19, 1983) was an American biochemist whose carbohydrate metabolism research led to the advancements in biomedical knowledge of enzymes and biosynthesis and the discovery of AICA ribonucleotide. During her career, she was an investigator at the National Institutes of Health and a research professor of experimental medicine at Rutgers Medical School.

== Education ==
Roloff was born in 1915 in New York City to Belle and George F. Roloff. Her paternal grandparents were from Germany. She graduated from Westfield High School. Roloff completed a B.S. from Douglass Residential College in 1937. She earned a Ph.D. from Columbia University in 1944. She was a member of Sigma Xi and Phi Beta Kappa. Her dissertation was titled, The metabolism of l(-)-pioIihe studied with the aid of deuterium and isotopic nitrogen. Rudolph Schoenheimer was Stetten's doctoral advisor.

== Career ==
Stetten held positions at Columbia University and Harvard Medical School. She worked as an associate in the division of nutrition and physiology at the Public Health Research Institute. Her early research focused on the mechanisms of purine biosynthesis and protein synthesis. She discovered AICA ribonucleotide and carried out some of the earliest studies of hydroxyproline biosynthesis. In 1954, she came to the National Institute of Arthritis and Metabolic Diseases and continued her biochemical work conducting classical studies on the structure of glycogen.

From 1963 to 1971, Stetten worked at the Rutgers Medical School as a research professor of experimental medicine. She returned to the National Institutes of Health in the intermediary metabolism section of the laboratory of biochemistry and metabolism in 1971. Stetten studied carbohydrate metabolism in mammalian livers, extending these studies to the horseshoe crab and the American lobster. Most of these studies were on the catalytic activities of the enzyme glucose-6-phosphatase.

Stetten was a member of the executive committee and board of trustees of the Marine Biological Laboratory. She was a member of the American Society of Biological Chemists.

== Personal life ==
In 1940, Roloff and DeWitt Stetten Jr. were engaged. They had four children. She was interested in the arts and was an amateur historian of the Elizabethan and Tudor period. She died on May 19, 1983.
