= JFK Medical Center (Edison, New Jersey) =

- Hackensack Meridian Health

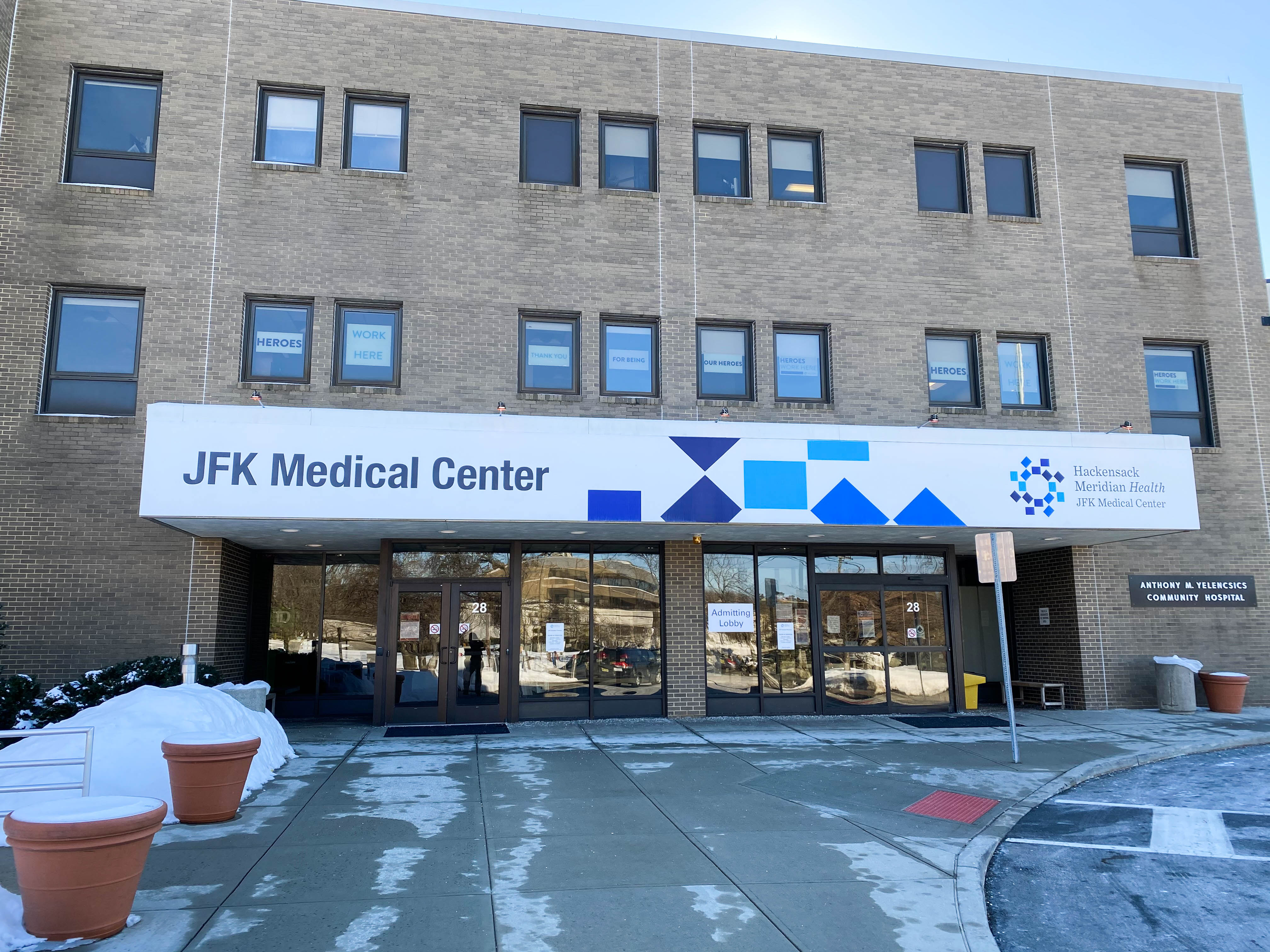

Geography
- Location: 65 James Street, Edison, New Jersey, United States
- Coordinates: 40.5570°N 74.3492°W

Organization
- Type: Teaching
- Affiliated university: Hackensack Meridian School of Medicine

Services
- Emergency department: Yes
- Beds: 499

History
- Founded: JFK 1967; JRI 1974; NSI 1992; Stroke & Neurovascular Center (SNC) 2009

Links
- Website: http://www.jfkmc.org
- Lists: Hospitals in New Jersey

John F. Kennedy University Medical Center (JFKMC), an affiliate of Hackensack Meridian Health (HMH), is a 499-bed full-service, acute care hospital, and the home of the JFK Johnson Rehabilitative Institute. It is affiliated with Hackensack Meridian School of Medicine and Robert Wood Johnson Medical School, and is located in Edison, New Jersey. In 2021 it announced an affiliation with the St. Joseph's Wayne Medical Center, also in New Jersey.

== About ==
JFKMC accommodates more than 20,000 admissions, 3,000 births and 60,000 emergency department visits on a yearly basis. The medical center features a complete array of services, including general surgery, emergency medicine, psychiatry, orthopedics, maternity and pediatric care.

=== Institutes ===
It is home to the JFK New Jersey Neuroscience Institute, the JFK Stroke and Neurovascular Center, the JFK Johnson Rehabilitation Institute, the JFK Haven Hospice, the JFK Imaging Center, and the Center for Wound Healing. It also has a Level II Special Care Nursery staffed by Onsite Neonatal Partners to treat premature and otherwise ill newborns.

JFKMC's Johnson Rehabilitation Institute (JRI) was ranked as one of the best hospitals in the nation for 2013–14 for rehabilitation by U.S. News & World Report. In 2021 that survey ranked JFK Johnson Rehabilitation Institute at #30 nationally.

JFKMC's Stroke and Neurovascular Center (SNC) is designated as a Comprehensive Stroke Center by the New Jersey Department of Health and Senior Services. It was established (2009) and led (as of 2021) by Dr. Jawad F. Kirmani, SNC has an advanced research program with capabilities of clinical, basic and translational research. SNC received the highest level of designation of Comprehensive Stroke Center by the Joint Commission and was the first Joint Commission-designated Comprehensive Stroke Center in the Tristate (New Jersey/New York/Connecticut) area (2012). It has the only teaching program in New Jersey offering an advanced comprehensive combined fellowship in Vascular Neurology, Neurocritical Care and Endovascular Surgical Neuroradiology.

== History ==
JFK Medical Center began in the 1960s as a grassroots campaign in response to the increasing demand for health care services created by a rapid population growth occurring in Edison, Woodbridge, Metuchen, and surrounding communities. The late Edison mayor, Anthony M. Yelencsics, for whom the original community hospital was named, led this effort. Mayor Yelencsics was appointed board chairman of the future hospital and his first official action was to establish a Women's Auxiliary. The Mayor asked long-time community resident and advocate, Mrs. Charles Wira of Edison to take on the responsibility of starting the Auxiliary – in order to raise funds and solicit support for the future community hospital. Mayor Yelencsics convinced Edison officials to donate nearly 40 acres of township land for the hospital. He then lobbied with congressional leaders – such as Middlesex County's own Rep. Edward J. Patten – to win $1.1 million in Hill-Burton funds, which at the time represented the largest single grant awarded in the state of New Jersey under that program. By this time, before the hospital had even opened its doors, more than $110,000 in pledges had been raised in community donations by the Auxiliary.

In 1974, the JFK Johnson Rehabilitation Institute (JRI) was added as a major component of JFK Medical Center. JFK Johnson is the Physical Medicine and Rehabilitation Department of the Rutgers Robert Wood Johnson Medical School. In 1992, JFK Neuroscience Institute (NSI) was started. In 1997, Solaris Health System was formed by joining JFK Medical Center and Muhlenberg Regional Medical Center in Plainfield, New Jersey. In 2009, JFK Stroke & Neurovascular Center was established. JFK Medical Center, hence became, a premier Comprehensive Stroke Center in the State of New Jersey. In 2018, JFK Medical Center became an integral part of Hackensack Meridian Health with a merger resulting in JFK providing a leadership role for the largest Health Network in Central New Jersey. JFK Medical Center also became the academic hub in Central New Jersey for the newly established Hackensack Meridian School of Medicine. To integrate the Patient Care, Educational and Research Goals across the newly formed network of hospitals spanning North, Central and South New Jersey Clinical Transformation Services were formed. A very active system-wide Stroke Council has been the flag bearer of Health care integration in the region. Stroke Council was established by Central Region President and CEO Mr. Raymond Fredericks in May, 2018. He nominated Jawad F. Kirmani, MD as the Founding Chair of the System Wide HMH Stroke Council. Stroke Council further established North, Central and Southern NJ Region Task Forces in April, 2019. Many of the best Stroke Neurologists, Neurosurgeons and Neurointerventionalists have featured in Stroke Council meetings in collaborative efforts to transform stroke care across the region.
