= Hackensack Meridian School of Medicine =

Private medical school in Nutley, New Jersey

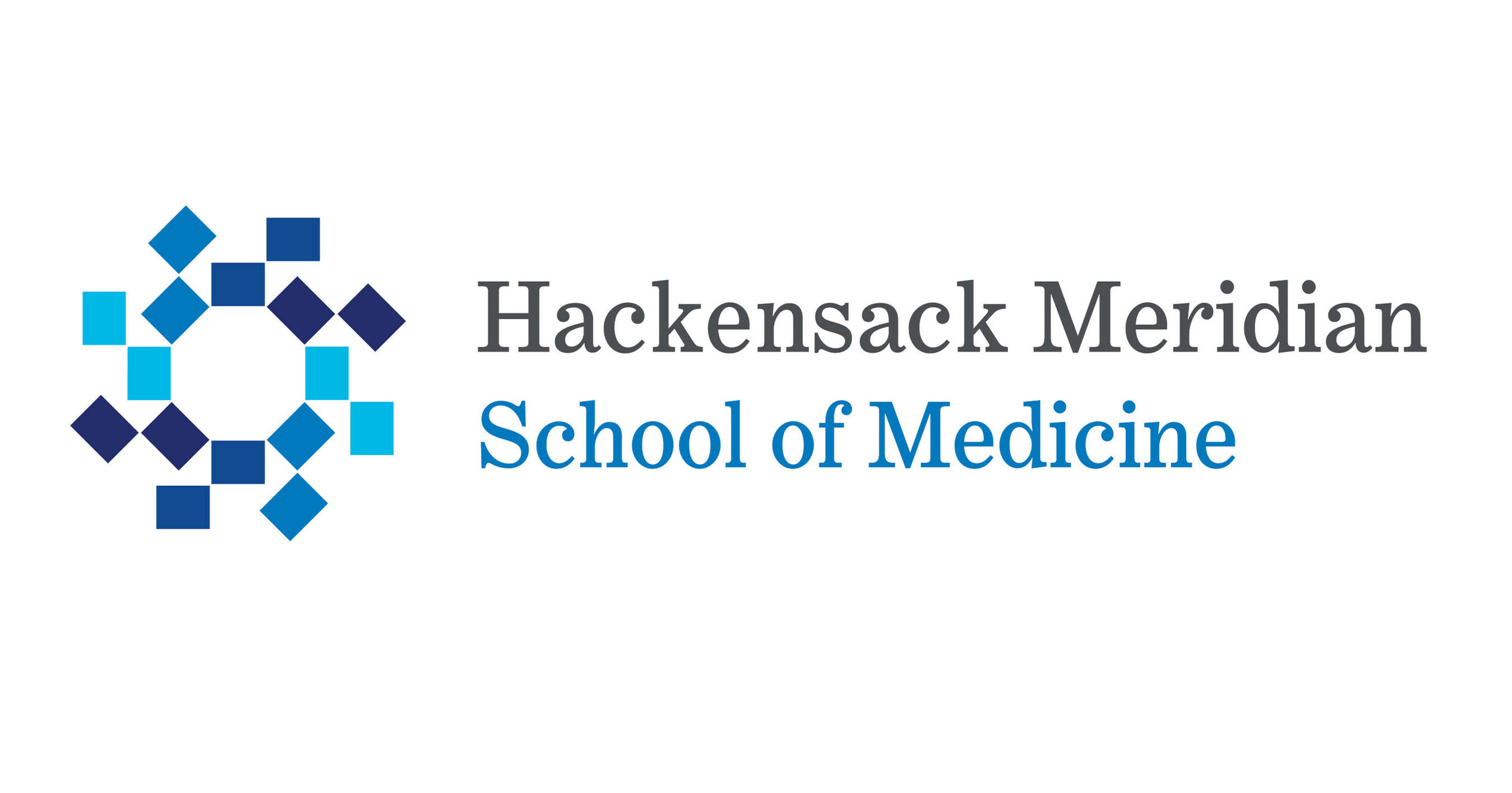
- Type: Private medical school
- Established: 2015
- Affiliations: Hackensack University Medical Center; JFK Medical Center; Jersey Shore University Medical Center
- Dean: Jeffrey R. Boscamp
- Location: Nutley, New Jersey, United States; 40.8334544°N 74.1551057°W
- Website: www.hmsom.edu/en/

Hackensack Meridian School of Medicine (HMSOM) is a private medical school in Nutley, New Jersey. It opened in 2015, becoming the first private medical school in New Jersey to open in decades. Originally affiliated with Seton Hall University (SHU), the Hackensack Meridian School of Medicine became independent in 2020.

HMSOM is affiliated with Hackensack Meridian Health (HMH), a network of 18 hospitals and the largest hospital network in the state after 2018 when a merger of Hackensack University Health Network (HUHN) and Meridian Health was completed with JFK Health. The merger comprises three regions across the state of NJ and the larger hospitals in each are: Hackensack University Medical Center (HUMC) in the North, JFK Medical Center in Central NJ, and the Jersey Shore University Medical Center (JSUMC) in the South. All three regional hubs serve as educational centers for HMSOM students during their clinical years of rotations.

== History ==
=== Initial establishment ===
On March 11, 2015, the New Jersey State Board of Medical Examiners granted conditional approval to open a new school of medicine called the Seton Hall - Hackensack Meridian School of Medicine, pending accreditation from the Liaison Committee on Medical Education (LCME). On June 5, 2015, SHU and HUHN, now known as Hackensack Meridian Health, signed the definitive agreement that cemented their commitment to move forward with the formation of the school. In July 2015, SHU and HMHN filed as an applicant school with the LCME, and renewed that application in December. On February 15, 2018, the school received its Preliminary Accreditation from the LCME.

On February 24, 2016, SHU and HUNH named Bonita F. Stanton a nationally recognized expert on pediatric medicine, as the founding dean. This was followed by the formation of the school's executive cabinet and board of governors. Stanton died in January 2022 and Jeffrey R. Boscamp was appointed the interim dean. In December 2022, HMSOM's Board of Governors appointed Boscamp as President and Dean of HMSOM.

=== Independence from Seton Hall ===
By April 2018, SHU had pulled out of the partnership, as the investment was too substantial for the university to afford. At that time, SHU and HMH determined that sole membership in HMSOM would transition to HMH. In the interim, HMH assumed full financial responsibility for the operation of the school in July 2018 and, at that time, the School was renamed the Hackensack Meridian School of Medicine at Seton Hall University. On July 3, 2020, the school formally separated from SHU as an independent medical school named Hackensack Meridian School of Medicine.

=== Initial accreditations and approvals ===
The New Jersey Office of Secretary of Higher Education notified HMSOM on October 2, 2019 that its petition for initial licensure to offer a Doctor of Medicine had been approved, effective immediately. A few weeks later, the Middle States Commission on Higher Education conducted its site visit and awarded HMSOM candidate for accreditation status at its March 5, 2020 meeting. In July the New Jersey Board of Medical Examiners issued conditional approval to HMSOM. The following year, the LCME granted provisional accreditation to the medical education program. In August 2022, the Middle States Commission on Higher Education conducted a virtual Site Evaluation Team Visit and, at the commission's November 2022 meeting, awarded Full Accreditation to HMSOM.

In February 2023, the LCME awarded full accreditation to the medical school, and on March 11, 2024, the NJSBME awarded approval for the medical education program. In 2023-24 U.S. News and World Report ranked the school #79 (tied) among Best Medical Schools: Research.

== Campus and facilities ==
The campus occupies 20 acres of a 120-acre site in Nutley, New Jersey and Clifton, New Jersey at the former Hoffman La Roche headquarters on Route 3, a central commuting artery to New York City. The building housing HMSOM has been renovated.

Students may rotate at various clinical locations within the Hackensack Meridian Health system as part of their "Phase 2" clerkships. These include Mountainside Medical Center, Palisades Medical Center, Hackensack University Medical Center, and Englewood Hospital in the system's Northern region, with additional sites such as JFK Medical Center and Jersey Shore University Medical Center in its Central and South regions.

The HMSOM campus is also home to the HMH Center for Discovery and Innovation, which comprises three institutes to focus on cancer, infectious diseases and regenerative medicine research. The Institute for Multiple Myeloma has already opened as a result of a research partnership between the HMH John Theurer Cancer Center and Georgetown Lombardi Comprehensive Cancer Center, a National Cancer Institute-designated Comprehensive Cancer Center.

== Students ==
In 2023-2024, HMSOM reported 567 students and 1,563 full-time faculty, resulting in a 3:1 full-time faculty-student ratio.

Students participate in a longitudinal experiential learning curriculum called The Human Dimension, which involves a Voices Program where students are paired with individuals in the surrounding community, a Community Health Project, and a scholarly capstone project.

Students are involved in research, with authorship credits in journals such as The New England Journal of Medicine and the Journal of the American Academy of Dermatology.

== See also ==
- Hackensack Meridian Health
