= Sherine Gabriel =

Egyptian–Canadian rheumatologist and administrator

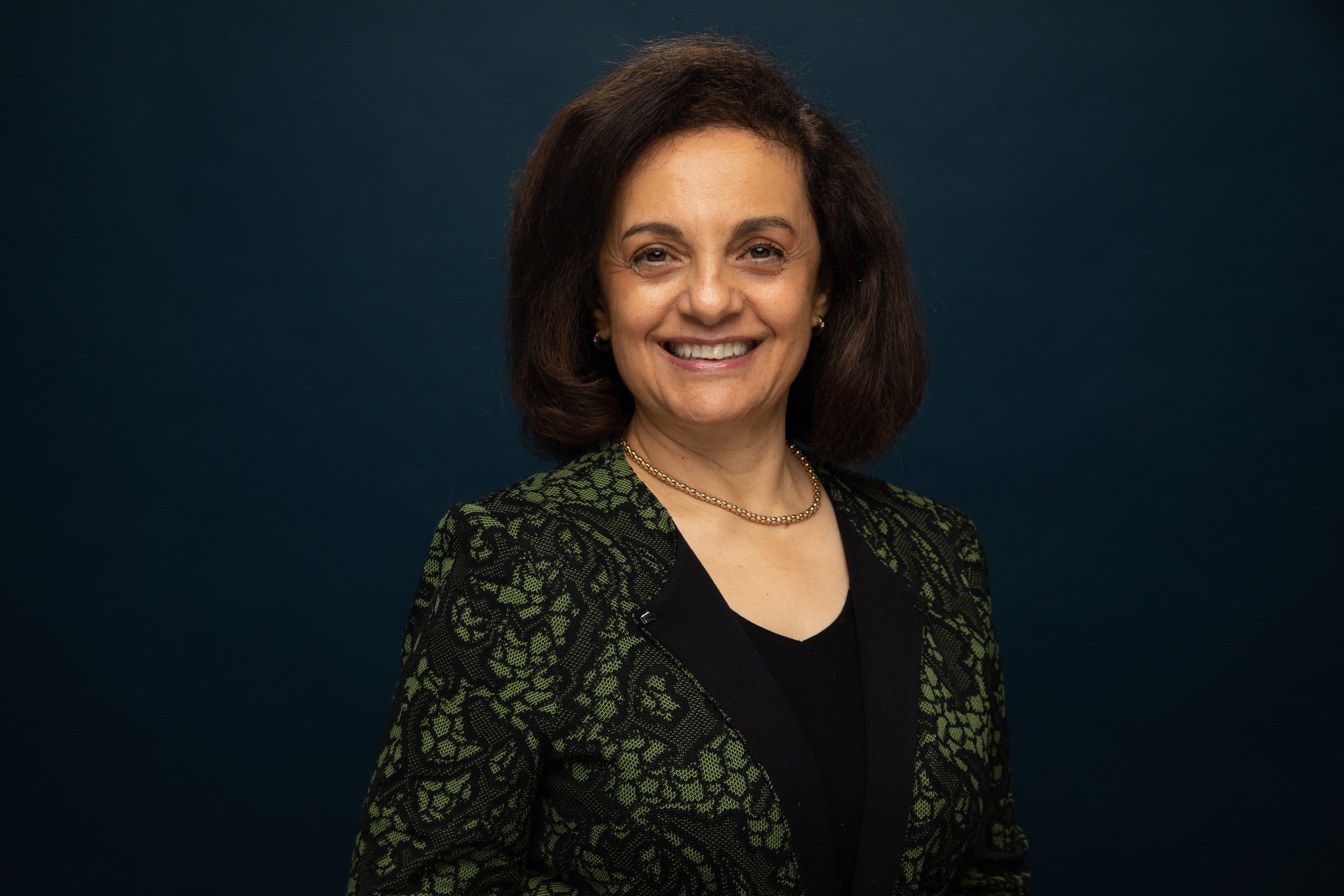
- Sherine Gabriel
- Born: Cairo, Egypt
- Spouse: Franklin R. Cockerill

Academic background
- Education: BS, University of Regina; MD, University of Saskatchewan Medical School; MS, clinical epidemiology, McMaster University

Academic work
- Institutions: Rush University; Robert Wood Johnson Medical School; Robert Wood Johnson Medical Group; Mayo Clinic College of Medicine and Science; Arizona State University

Sherine E. Gabriel is an Egyptian-American–Canadian rheumatologist and administrator. She is the executive vice president of ASU Health at Arizona State University and is the planning dean for the John Shufeldt School of Medicine and Medical Engineering. Gabriel is also a professor in ASU's College of Health Solutions and Edson College of Nursing and Health Innovation. Prior to joining ASU in 2022, she was the fourth president of Rush University and dean of the Robert Wood Johnson Medical School at Rutgers University.

In 2020, Gabriel was elected a Fellow of the National Academy of Medicine for "her leadership in academic medicine and recognition for being an inspiring thought leader in research, clinical business development and educational innovation."

== Early life and education ==
Gabriel was born and raised in Cairo, Egypt, until her family moved to Regina, Saskatchewan, when she was 10 years old. After graduating from Campbell Collegiate, she enrolled at the University of Regina for her undergraduate degree and the University of Saskatchewan for her medical degree. Following medical school, she completed her residency in internal medicine at the Mayo Clinic and her fellowship in rheumatology at the Mayo Graduate School of Medicine.

== Career ==
Gabriel joined the faculty of the Mayo Clinic College of Medicine and Science in 1993 as a consultant in the Division of Rheumatology, Department of Internal Medicine, and the Department of Health Sciences Research. From there, she became the vice Chair, and eventually full chair, of the Department of Health Sciences Research. In 2005, she was named the William J. and Charles H. Mayo endowed professor at Mayo Medical School and later appointed the 72nd President of the American College of Rheumatology in 2007. During her tenure at the Mayo clinic, she focused on the risks of connective tissue diseases among women with breast implants and on rheumatic diseases and the economic impact of rheumatoid arthritis. In 2012, Gabriel was appointed Dean of Mayo Medical School, succeeding Terrence Cascino.

In 2015, Gabriel was appointed the first female dean of the Robert Wood Johnson Medical School, thus also becoming one of the highest paid administrators at Rutgers. When speaking of Gabriel, Brian L. Strom said, "she is a noted researcher with a strong background in research administration and has played significant roles in the success of Mayo Clinic’s business development activities." In her inaugural year as dean, she also welcomed the largest class in history to Rutgers Robert Wood Johnson Medical School. In 2017, Gabriel was named to the New York Academy of Medicine Board of Trustees and received the Rheumatologist of the Year Award from the Arthritis Foundation.

Gabriel stayed at the Robert Wood Johnson Medical School until 2018 when she was named the new president of Rush University. In her role as president, Gabriel was honored with the National Medical Fellowships’ Excellence in Medical Education Award for being a "leader, educator, physician and researcher" and was selected for the Daniel Burnham Fellowship. In 2020, Gabriel was elected a Fellow of the National Academy of Medicine for "her leadership in academic medicine and recognition for being an inspiring thought leader in research, clinical business development and educational innovation." Gabriel announced her retirement from Rush University in May 2022.

In September 2022, Arizona State University (ASU) announced Gabriel's appointment as University Professor of the Future of Health Outcomes and Chair of the ASU Health Outcomes Design Council. She was named executive vice president of ASU Health, a multifaceted health initiative within the university, in 2023. ASU Health includes a medical school, the School of Medicine and Advanced Medical Engineering, with preliminary accreditation planned for 2025.

== Personal life ==
Gabriel and her husband Franklin R. Cockerill have two sons together.
