= Hackensack Meridian Health =

Health system in New Jersey, U.S

- Formation: June 21, 2016; 10 years ago
- Merger of: Hackensack UMC; Meridian Health
- Headquarters: 343 Thornall Street; Edison, NJ 08837; U.S.
- Region served: New Jersey
- Services: Health System
- Key people: Robert C. Garrett, FACHE (CEO)
- Affiliations: Hackensack Meridian School of Medicine
- Website: www.hackensackmeridianhealth.org

Hackensack Meridian Health (HMH) is an American network of healthcare providers in New Jersey, based out of Edison, in Middlesex County. Members include academic centers, acute care facilities, and research hospitals. Hackensack Meridian Health aims to create one integrated network for healthcare delivery in New Jersey. The HMH network was formed in 2016 by a merger between Hackensack University Medical Center and Meridian Health. Hackensack Meridian Health is affiliated with the Hackensack Meridian School of Medicine and maintains active teaching programs at its hospitals. Since the acquisition of JFK Medical Center in Edison, HMH has now become the largest healthcare provider in New Jersey.

== About ==
As of November 2021, HMH operates 17 hospitals, employs approximately 36,000 staff, and manages more than 500 additional facilities,home health services, rehab centers, and skilled nursing centers spanning from Bergen to Atlantic counties. In Fall 2021, seven of its affiliate hospitals received an 'A' grade from Hospital Safety Grade. Prior to the pharmacy chain's bankruptcy and store closures, HMH ran clinics at certain Rite Aid outlets in New Jersey to treat minor health issues and make primary care physicians available for more serious conditions and urgent care needs. In 2021, U.S. News & World Report listed five of the hospitals in the HMH network as "best ranked" in New Jersey.

=== Technology ===
In 2021, HMH was among the first hospital organizations to completely convert its computing hardware to ChromeOS devices, employ Google Cloud to increase cyber security and deploy machine learning and healthcare artificial intelligence to expedite diagnostic decisions and assist with clinical treatments. HMH reported that artificial intelligence tools would support newborn screening, mammography, prostate cancer detection, sepsis identification, and COVID‑19 diagnostics., sepsis detection and COVID-19 detection. The increased cyber security was in response to a ransomware attack on December 2, 2019, that compromised computer systems and forced administrators to cancel roughly 100 elective medical procedures. The attack lasted five days and "affected anything with computer software." Administrators chose to pay the ransom of an undisclosed amount and released a statement on December 13 saying, "We believe it’s our obligation to protect our communities' access to health care."

=== COVID-19 response ===
In 2021, the HMH network was awarded more than US$100 million in funds for FEMA for emergency relief and treated more than 10,000 patients. After the CDC approved the Pfizer vaccine for children ages 5–11, the first vaccines administered to that age group were at HMH's Jersey Shore University Medical Center. HMH mandated that every one of its employees be fully vaccinated by November 15, 2021. Though 70% of all health workers were vaccinated by July, 2021, there was resistance among staff partially due to concerns over vaccination causing sterility.

=== Philanthropy ===
==== New York Giants ====
HMH and the New York Giants work together on various projects for health education, disease prevention, clinical research and philanthropic opportunities. In 2021, the MetLife Stadium Legacy Club was renamed the Hackensack Meridian Health Legacy Club at MetLife Stadium. The naming rights were formerly held by New York-Presbyterian Hospital, a former sponsor. Also in 2021, Eli Manning, a retired player for the Giants, joined HMH’s board of trustees.

==== HMH Foundation ====
The HMH Foundation was established to oversee and make organize 10 separate, localized hospital foundations in its network. Substantial gifts in 2021 are earmarked by the donors for cardiac treatment research, COVID-19 PPE supplies, and discretionary use in meeting the HMH stated mission. An initiative of the foundation is Tackle Kids' Cancer, with funds raised for the HMH network's Joseph M. Sanzari Children’s Hospital at Hackensack University Medical Center.

== Mergers and acquisitions ==
In November 2006, Hackensack University Medical Center entered into a memorandum of understanding with Pascack Valley Hospital (PVH), located in Westwood, to possibly acquire the hospital from Well Care Group, Inc. On October 1, 2008, Hackensack University Medical Center North at Pascack Valley opened as "a satellite emergency department to treat non-life-threatening emergencies." It was ultimately converted in 2013 to a full-service hospital together with for-profit partner LHP Hospital Group (now Ardent Health Services) .

In September, 2014 Meridian Health signed a letter of intent with administrators from Raritan Bay Medical Center (RBMC) to explore options for a merger. At that time, RBMC was facing increased financial pressure. On January 1, 2016, the merger was completed.

On May 12, 2015, Meridian Health and Hackensack University Medical Center signed a definitive agreement to merge pending regulatory approval. The merger finalized in 2016.

On January 3, 2019, HMH finalized a merger with Carrier Clinic, a psychiatric healthcare provider. Plans for the merger established behavioral health urgent care centers throughout New Jersey and set up tele-psychiatry services. HMH also promised to invest US$25 million in the Belle Mead campus for upgraded infrastructure, technology and expansion of services provided.

On October 15, 2019, HMH announced a merger with Englewood Health, a healthcare provider in Bergen County. HMH agreed to invest $400 million into the facility. The investment included new operating rooms, additional outpatient care facilities and larger cardiac catheterization labs. The affiliation also included an expanded academic partnership with the Hackensack Meridian School of Medicine. The proposed merger would enable Englewood to become a tertiary academic medical center. In December 2020, it was announced that the Federal Trade Commission would be suing HMH to block the merger due to monopolistic practices. The planned merger between HMH and Englewood Health was called off in 2022.

On September 9, 2020, HMH announced a ten-year partnership with American Dream in East Rutherford. The partnership includes opening an urgent care center at the complex, helping the complex reopen during the COVID-19 pandemic in New Jersey, and having pop-up events at American Dream about health and wellness.

On January 29, 2025, Hackensack Meridian Health announced a partnership agreement with Apollo Hospitals, India's number one largest private hospital network, to collaborate and innovate new health care solutions that could be implemented in both countries. The goal is to leverage both systems' combined resources to improve patient outcomes. This marked the company's first large-scale health care venture outside the U.S and it's biggest partnership with an Indian healthcare company.

On June 22, 2026, Hunterdon Health and Hackensack Meridian Health announced that they had signed a letter of intent for a proposed merger. The announcement came after the Boards of Trustees of both healthcare systems voted to authorize the organizations to move forward with exploring the merger.

== List of hospitals ==
Hospitals in the system
Hospital	Location	Original network	Beds	Type	Notes
Bayshore Medical Center	Holmdel	Meridian Health	169	Community hospital	
Carrier Clinic	Belle Mead		281	Psychiatric hospital	Acquired in 2019
Hackensack University Medical Center	Hackensack	HackensackUMC	781	Acute care	Flagship of Hackensack Meridian Health, ranked #2 in NJ
Jersey Shore University Medical Center	Neptune	Meridian Health	646	Acute care	Flagship of former Meridian Health, ranked #5 in NJ
JFK Medical Center	Edison		499	Acute care	Acquired in 2016
Joseph M. Sanzari Children's Hospital	Hackensack	HackensackUMC	105	Children's hospital	Best children's hospital in New Jersey
K. Hovnanian Children’s Hospital	Neptune	Meridian Health	88	Children's hospital	
Mountainside Medical Center	Montclair	HackensackUMC	231	Community hospital	
Ocean Medical Center	Brick	Meridian Health	318	Acute care	
Palisades Medical Center	North Bergen	HackensackUMC	350	Acute care	
Pascack Valley Medical Center	Westwood	HackensackUMC	128	Community hospital	
Raritan Bay Medical Center	Perth Amboy, Old Bridge		501	Acute care	Acquired in 2016
Riverview Medical Center	Red Bank	Meridian Health	476	Acute care	
Southern Ocean Medical Center	Manahawkin	Meridian Health	174	Community hospital	

== See also ==
- RWJBarnabas Health
- Seton Hall University
- Atlantic Health System
