= Raritan Valley Hospital =

Defunct hospital in New Jersey, US

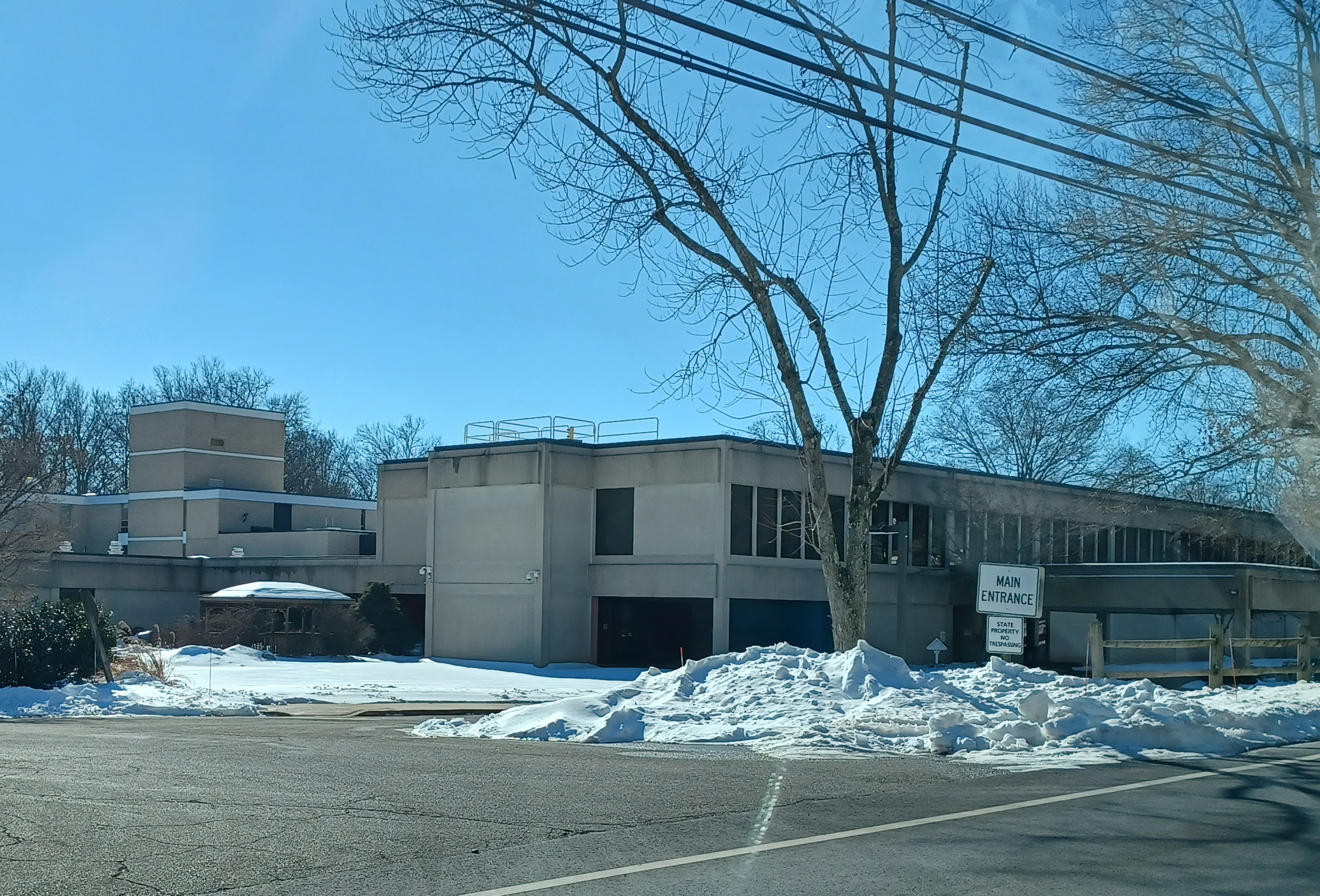
Green Brook Regional Center, formerly Raritan Valley Hospital

Raritan Valley Hospital is a former hospital in Green Brook Township, New Jersey, that served as the first teaching hospital of Rutgers Medical School, now Robert Wood Johnson Medical School. It operated from 1966 to 1981.

== History ==
In 1962, DeWitt Stetten Jr. was appointed the first dean of Rutgers Medical School (RMS) and began developing a two-year program for medical students teaching basic medical sciences. At that time, the main campus of RMS was in Piscataway, with administrative offices, teaching facilities, and laboratories. After two years, students with the master of Medical Sciences (M.M.S.) degree had to transfer to another medical school for clinical training. Also in 1962, the Raritan Valley Hospital Association bought land from the Furst Family in Green Brook Township to build a hospital for use by the faculty of RMS. This hospital, Raritan Valley Hospital (RVH), became operative in 1966. With 118 beds, it provided emergency room services, operating and procedure rooms, office and laboratory space, and supporting facilities.

In 1970, the hospital was acquired by the College of Medicine and Dentistry of New Jersey (a state institution) to enable RMS to proceed with clinical teaching.

In 1972, RMS expanded to become a full four-year medical school. and began clinical teaching at RVH. Additional clinical teaching was established at various community hospitals and health care centers.

A 1979 report indicated that the hospital was underutilized and financially in trouble. By 1980, RMS had moved its clinical focus to New Brunswick, where clinical teaching programs had been established, primarily at Middlesex General Hospital and Saint Peter's Hospital. RVH was closed in 1981. It was then converted into a state-run facility for elderly patients with moderate to severe developmental disabilities as the Green Brook Regional Center.
