= Aligning Forces for Quality =

U.S. National healthcare program

Aligning Forces for Quality is a U.S. national program of the Robert Wood Johnson Foundation aiming to lift the quality of health care in 16 targeted communities, reduce racial and ethnic disparities in those communities and provide models for national reform. Each regional Health care improvement collaborative aims to create sustainable improvements in health care quality throughout its targeted communities by 2015. To do so, the initiative fosters collaboration among multiple stakeholders in a community. Aligning Forces For Quality focuses its efforts on three main areas: Performance measurement and public reporting, consumer engagement, and quality improvement. Aligning Forces for Quality is the single largest philanthropic effort of its kind undertaken to improve the quality of U.S. health care.

== History ==
The Robert Wood Johnson Foundation launched the first phase of Aligning Forces for Quality in 2007 as an effort to help communities build health care systems where none existed. The first phase provided leadership teams from 14 communities with grants and assistance to help them work with physicians and improve the quality of care, measure and publicly report on the quality of ambulatory care, and enable consumers to make informed health care choices. The program expanded in June 2008 to include a focus on inpatient care, reducing racial and ethnic gaps in care, and enhancing the role of nursing. Since 2007, the initiative has added three additional communities into the alliance, bringing the total number of participating communities to 16. To date, the Robert Wood Johnson Foundation has committed up to $300 million in funding for Aligning Forces for Quality.

Operating primarily on the notion that no single person, group or profession can improve health and health without the support of others, Aligning Forces for Quality seeks to create improvements by aligning key players in local communities. Accordingly, each of the Aligning Forces communities is built around a local leadership alliance, which includes participation from area physicians, nurses, patients, consumers and consumer groups, purchasers, hospitals, health plans, safety net providers and others.

== Organization and approach ==
The Aligning Forces for Quality national program office (NPO) oversees and directs assistance to the communities participating in the initiative. These activities are designed to create improvement by engaging teams in participating communities, as well as the broader health care market. Katherine Browne, M.B.A, M.H.A, serves as the interim director/chief operating officer of the NPO, which is located within the Department of Health Policy at The George Washington University School of Public Health and Health Services.

== Areas of focus ==
In each community, the Alliances focus on moving quality forward at the local level through activities in three areas of focus:

- Performance measurement and public reporting: Using common standards to measure the quality of care doctors and hospitals deliver to patients, and making that information available to the public. Under the Quality/Equality portfolio, many RWJF grantees are working to measure and report physicians' performance to help doctors improve the care they deliver and to help consumers and patients make informed choices.
- Consumer engagement: Encouraging patients to be active and effective managers of their health care. Through Aligning Forces RWJF is working with targeted communities and national organizations to help patients and consumers better understand, demand and choose quality health care.
- Quality improvement: Implementing techniques and protocols that doctors, nurses and staff in hospitals and clinics can follow to raise the level of care they deliver to patients. Establishing safer and more effective care will require better teamwork, communication and coordination among those who give care, get care and pay for care.

AF4Q Quality Improvement Networks Hospital Quality Network: Communities in Aligning Forces for Quality are also engaging hospitals in RWJF-funded quality improvement initiatives, aimed at increasing the role of nurses in improving quality, reducing hospital readmissions among cardiac care patients, improving language services for patients who speak little English and increasing the efficiency of hospital emergency departments. Through their participation in one of four collaboratives, hospitals across the communities are increasing the quality, efficiency and equity of their care. These include:

- Engaging Nurses: Hospitals participating in Transforming Care at the Bedside engage nurses and other front-line hospital staff to improve the quality and safety of patient care. They increase the vitality and retention of nurses. They engage and improve patients’ and family members’ experience of care. Lastly, they improve the effectiveness of the entire care team.
- Improving Language Services: Hospitals use a tested quality improvement measurement process to look at how they communicate with non-English-speaking patients. The goal is to engage clinicians, language services providers and leaders at all levels to demonstrably improve the availability and delivery of language services – a necessary part of quality care.
- Increasing Throughput: Hospitals nationwide struggle to improve the efficiency and flow of their emergency departments, so that patients are treated in a timely manner, and either leave the hospital or are admitted and assigned a bed. The goal is to engage doctors, nurses and various administrative services to better manage the patient flow so timely, high-quality care is delivered in the most appropriate setting.
- Reducing Readmissions: Hospitals participating in this network aim to reduce the readmission of heart patients back into the hospital, which increases costs and slows recovery. The goal is to engage health care providers and leaders at all levels, in an effort to improve the quality of care delivered to all patients with acute myocardial infarction and heart failure.

Ambulatory Quality Network: Communities are also part of a peer-learning network that will help them build the infrastructure for ongoing improvement in primary care. The goal is to support communities in developing patient-centered medical homes and implementing and sustaining successful homegrown primary care improvement collaboratives. With expert input and facilitation, the Ambulatory Quality network will bring together local stakeholders to collaborate on improving ambulatory care in their communities, while sharing tools, strategies and lessons learned.

== See also ==
- Robert Wood Johnson Foundation
- Health Quality Report Cards
- Successfully Reporting & Communicating Performance Measures: Lessons from Consumers
