= Health care ratings =

Health care ratings are ratings or evaluations of health care. In the United States they have been an increasingly used tool to try to drive accountability among health care providers and in the context of classic supply/demand view of Health economics, to help health care consumers make better choices.

Reviews in 2008 and 2009 review of research on the effects of health care ratings found that there was evidence that public ratings drove hospitals to improve their performance, but there was limited evidence that they affected how consumers choose health care providers or insurance plans, or that they changed the performance of individual doctors or insurance companies.

In may cases it is difficult to create health care ratings that can meaningfully summarize any individual provider's performance in a way that be compared with others', and data is often lacking with which to generate ratings.

People may have difficulty finding the ratings, especially if they are negative. To make these reports more accessible, large philanthropies, including the Robert Wood Johnson Foundation, have funded major initiatives that are focused on performance measurement like the Aligning Forces for Quality program.

== See also ==
- Health system international comparisons
