= Carrier Clinic =

Coordinates: 40.468°N 74.684°W

- Hackensack Meridian Health

Geography
- Location: Belle Mead, New Jersey, United States

History
- Opened: 1910

Links
- Website: http://www.carrierclinic.org
- Lists: Hospitals in New Jersey

Carrier Clinic is an American private, not-for-profit behavioral healthcare system located in Belle Mead, New Jersey specializing in psychiatric and addiction treatment. Carrier's system includes a 281 licensed bed inpatient psychiatric hospital, a 32-bed detoxification and rehabilitation center, a 78-bed adolescent residential facility, and a fully accredited middle and high school for students classified emotionally disturbed.

Since 1910, Carrier has offered a wide array of specialized services to care for individuals suffering from psychiatric and addictive illness. Treatment for illnesses such as anxiety, depression, dementia and substance dependence is offered to individuals of every age, specialized services for the older adult, and electroconvulsive therapy (ECT) services on both an inpatient and outpatient basis.
