= St. Mary's General Hospital (Passaic, New Jersey) =

Coordinates: 40.8510°N 74.1283°W

St. Mary's Hospital
- Prime Healthcare Services
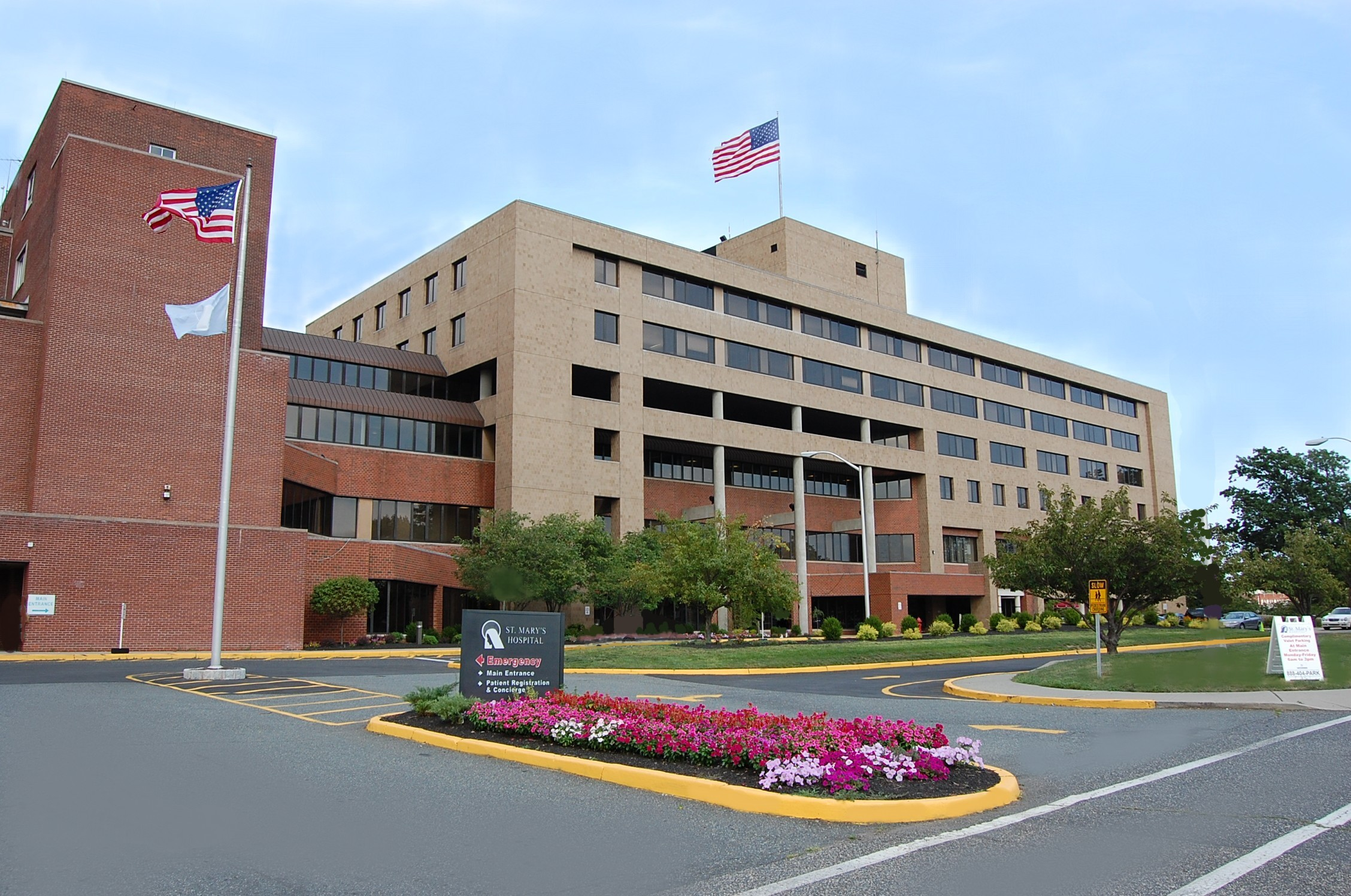

Geography
- Location: 350 Boulevard, Passaic, New Jersey, U.S.

Organisation
- Care system: Medicare (US), Medicaid, Charity care
- Type: Acute care

Services
- Standards: The Joint Commission
- Beds: 287

History
- Founded: 1895

Links
- Website: http://www.smh-nj.org/
- Lists: Hospitals in U.S.

St. Mary's General Hospital is an acute care hospital in Passaic, New Jersey that offers a range of health care services and community outreach programs. The hospital is located on a campus in Passaic that is bordered on the south by Oak Street, the north by Crescent Place, the west by Lafayette Avenue, and the east by Boulevard.

St. Mary's address, officially, is 350 Boulevard. For most of its existence, however, the hospital operated at a facility located at 211 Pennington Avenue in the Passaic Park section of the city. It is affiliated with the Sisters of Charity of Saint Elizabeth, a Roman Catholic convent in Morris Township, New Jersey.

As of 2014, St. Mary's is owned by Prime Healthcare Services. It added the "General" to its name following the acquisition.

== Description ==
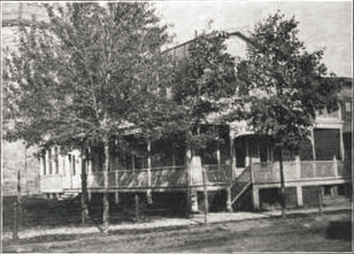
HOLY NAME CLUB HOUSE Temporary first home of St Mary's Hospital

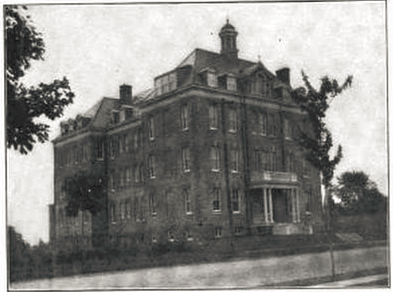
First Purpose-built St. Mary's building

St. Mary's Hospital currently serves approximately 13,000 inpatients annually, in addition to caring for 10,500 patients requiring same-day procedures. A new ER Fast Track Center was added in 2009 to better accommodate the nearly 35,000 visits to St. Mary's busy ER each year.

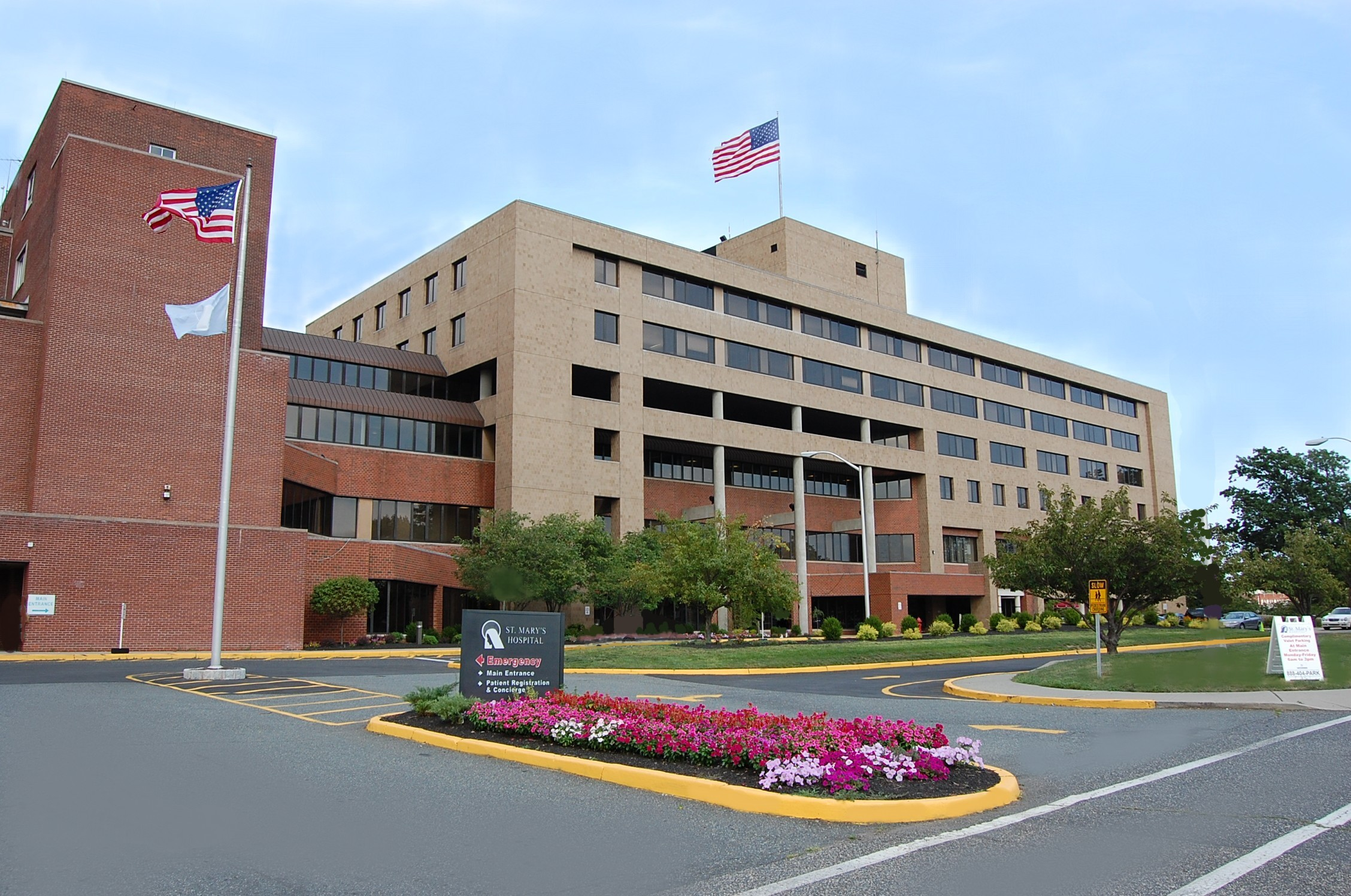
St. Mary's Hospital main facility located at 350 Boulevard

== History of hospitals in Passaic ==
Construction of St. Mary's original location began on May 23, 1897. (Other accounts, likely mistaken, indicate that it was almost completed in March of that year.) Until then, the city had only a medical dispensary, but not a full service hospital facility. There was some controversy between competing groups over the building of a new hospital, but both groups appear to have succeeded in opening separate institutions at about the same time.

Two other hospitals later opened, giving the city three hospitals for many years. They all eventually merged into a single remaining entity, today's St. Mary's. Though each provided full-service hospital facilities, each predecessor Passaic hospital had its own specialty.

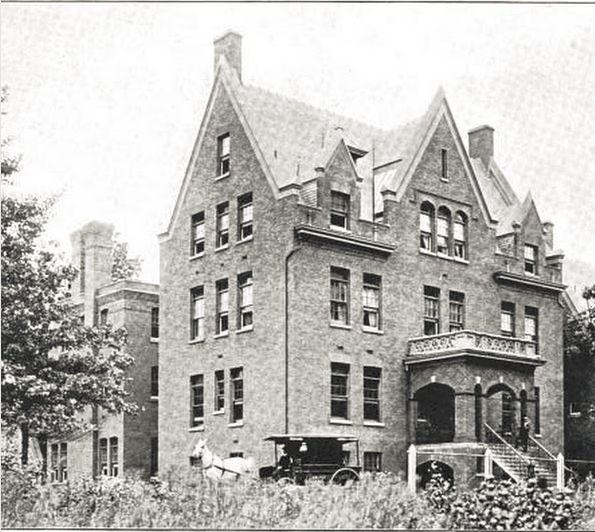
- Original General Hospital complex on the site of the current St. Mary's campus
  Passaic General Hospital, later known as The General Hospital Center at Passaic, was located at 350 Boulevard (St. Mary's present location). Passaic General's specialty was cardiology, renowned for its Eastern Heart Institute and for pioneering the first open heart surgery in the state. It opened on November 1, 1897, despite thin financing. The hospital grounds were donated for the purpose by descendants of the Aycrigg family.
- Passaic Beth Israel Hospital, often known as PBI, was the city's other sectarian hospital. It was funded by the local Jewish community, and located on Parker Avenue near Passaic's northern border with neighboring Clifton. It was a leader in treating cancer, having respected center of excellence in the field on oncology. PBI later merged with Passaic General.
- St. Mary's Hospital was noted for its maternal-child and behavioral health programs. The original hospital complex was at 211 Pennington Avenue in Passaic Park. St. Mary's later bought the assets of the other two hospitals and moved to the 350 Boulevard location, where it continues to operate. St. Mary's first hospital opened on August 15, 1895, in a club house near St. Nicholas Catholic Church on Washington Street. The church's rector purchased the Pennington Avenue site at about the same time, and the building opened November 8, 1898.

=== 2000-2004: General and Beth Israel merger and bankruptcy ===
In 2000, Atlantic Health Systems acquired the General Hospital Center at Passaic. Four years later, the owners of Beth Israel Hospital bought General from Atlantic and closed the Parker Avenue facility, merging the operations of both hospitals into the Boulevard facility. The merged hospital took on the name PBI Regional Medical Center. Within two years, PBI Regional filed for bankruptcy.

=== 2006: St. Mary's ===
St. Mary's, which was having problems maintaining its 112-year-old facility, was called on to save the failing hospital and received a grant from the state to purchase the hospital and move their operations to the Boulevard site, thus leaving Passaic with one surviving hospital.

Although on March 9, 2009, St. Mary's Hospital filed for Chapter 11 bankruptcy protection, a federal bankruptcy judge approved of its reorganization plan less than a year from filing, as reported in the week of March 2, 2010. "St. Mary's emerges from Chapter 11 stronger and better than before," said Michael J. Sniffen, St. Mary's president/CEO, in a media release. "After less than one year, we emerge revitalized, improved, and re-committed to serving the community and the physicians that have so loyally supported us through this difficult process."

The facility on Pennington Avenue was maintained for psychiatric admissions and care for some time after the rest of the hospital moved. However, St. Mary's closed its psychiatric unit on May 12, 2009, transferring admissions to Clara Maass Medical Center in Belleville, New Jersey. The Psychiatric Emergency Screening Unit moved to St. Joseph's Regional Medical Center in Paterson; this unit is the primary facility used for psychiatric emergency care in Passaic County, which left the original facility empty. From 2009 to 2010 the building was used by NBC to film episodes of the first season of the medical drama Mercy.

== Notable people ==
- William Carlos Williams, physician and poet, was affiliated with St. Mary's predecessor, Passaic General Hospital, where he served as the hospital's chief of pediatrics. The hospital has a memorial plaque that states "we walk the wards that Williams walked."
- Paul Sarlo, politician who represents New Jersey's 36th legislative district in the New Jersey Senate and Mayor of Wood-Ridge, New Jersey
- Jan Cieplak, Polish Roman Catholic priest and archbishop, died there on February 17, 1926.
