= PBI Regional Medical Center =

Hospital in New Jersey, United States

Coordinates: 40.8592°N 74.1373°W

The PBI Regional Medical Center was a hospital in Passaic, New Jersey which was located on Boulevard, between Oak Street and Howe Avenue (now home to St. Mary's Hospital).

== History ==
The building was the original home of the General Hospital Center at Passaic, or Passaic General for short. The PBI in the name came from the former Passaic Beth Israel Hospital, which was located on Parker Avenue.

Shortly after Atlantic Healthcare Systems, which owned Passaic General, sold the hospital, Passaic General began to have financial trouble. To consolidate, both Passaic General and Beth Israel were merged into one hospital system, which became known as PBI Regional, and consolidated their operations to the Boulevard building (Beth Israel Hospital was subsequently demolished, 2005).

The financial struggles continued for PBI after the merger, and eventually the hospital was taken over by the St. Mary's system, which moved their operations to the site and reduced Passaic to one hospital where three had existed prior to the merger.

Some episodes of The Sopranos were shot at PBI Regional Medical Center.

Today the former PBI Regional Medical Center Campus is being transformed into: Dayton Avenue Educational Campus.. The Dayton Avenue Educational Campus will include a Pre-Kindergarten, Elementary and Middle School on a 12-acre site. The new 448,000 square-foot school will educate approximately 2,760 students in grades pre-kindergarten through eight. https://www.njsda.gov/NJSDA/ProjectSchoolDetails/SchoolGrantDetails?vProjectID=31-3970-x03&vSchoolDistrict=Passaic%20City
