= DeWitt Stetten Jr. =

American biochemist

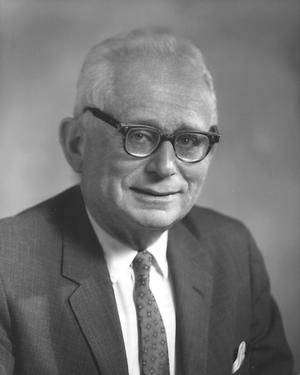

Dewitt Stetten Jr. (May 31, 1909 – August 28, 1990) was an American biochemist. Stetten was dean of the medical school of Rutgers University, president of the Foundation for Advanced Education in the Sciences, and a member of the National Academy of Sciences. A collection of his papers is held at the National Library of Medicine in Bethesda, Maryland. He was married to fellow biochemist Marjorie Roloff Stetten.

== Chronology ==
- May 31, 1909 was born in New York City
- 1930 A.B., Harvard College
- 1934 M.D., Columbia University
- 1940 Ph.D. in Biochemistry, Columbia University
- 1962 appointed Dean of Medical School, Rutgers University
- 1974 elected to the National Academy of Sciences
