= Riverview Medical Center =

Coordinates: 40.3539°N 74.0628°W

- General hospital

Geography
- Location: Red Bank, Monmouth, New Jersey, United States

Organization
- Type: Community
- Affiliated university: Hackensack Meridian School of Medicine
- Network: Hackensack Meridian HealthD

Services
- Emergency department: Yes
- Beds: 476

History
- Founded: 1928

Links
- Website: http://www.riverviewmedicalcenter.com
- Lists: Hospitals in New Jersey

Riverview Medical Center is a 450-bed acute care community hospital located in Red Bank, New Jersey, United States. It serves the northern region of Monmouth County, New Jersey. In 2021 was ranked in the top 50 hospitals in New Jersey by U.S. News. It received American Nurses Credentialing Center’s (ANCC) Magnet® Recognition Program® awards in 2012 and 2017.

== History ==
The hospital was founded in June 1922 as Woodley Hospital|Woodley Sanitarium and Nursing Home in Little Silver, New Jersey, by Mary Augusta Garner Seaman on the family's Victorian estate. In 1927, it relocated to two rented houses at 139 Broad Street, Red Bank, New Jersey, after the Little Silver property was sold by Miss Seaman's mother. It was incorporated in 1928 and moved to a renovated boarding house on Union Street as Red Bank Hospital, with 29 beds, one operating room, a delivery suite and facilities for six newborns. After a public naming contest, it was renamed Riverview Hospital on August 10, 1929.

== Facilities ==
Riverview Medical Center was purchased by Hackensack University Medical Center in 2016, and is now a part of Hackensack Meridian Health.

Riverview Medical Center provides assisted living nursing home care and home care.

Riverview Medical Center was ranked third in 2019 by Soliant Health on its 2019 list of the most beautiful hospitals in the United States.

== Notable deaths ==
- Karl Guthe Jansky (1905–1954)
- Harold A. Zahl (1904–1973)
- Mason Welch Gross (1911–1977)
- Katharine Elkus White (1906–1985)
- Alfred Nash Beadleston, Jr. (1912–2000)
- Lynn Yamada Davis (1956–2024)
