= Mountainside Medical Center =

Hackensack Meridian Health Mountainside Medical Center
- Hackensack Meridian Health

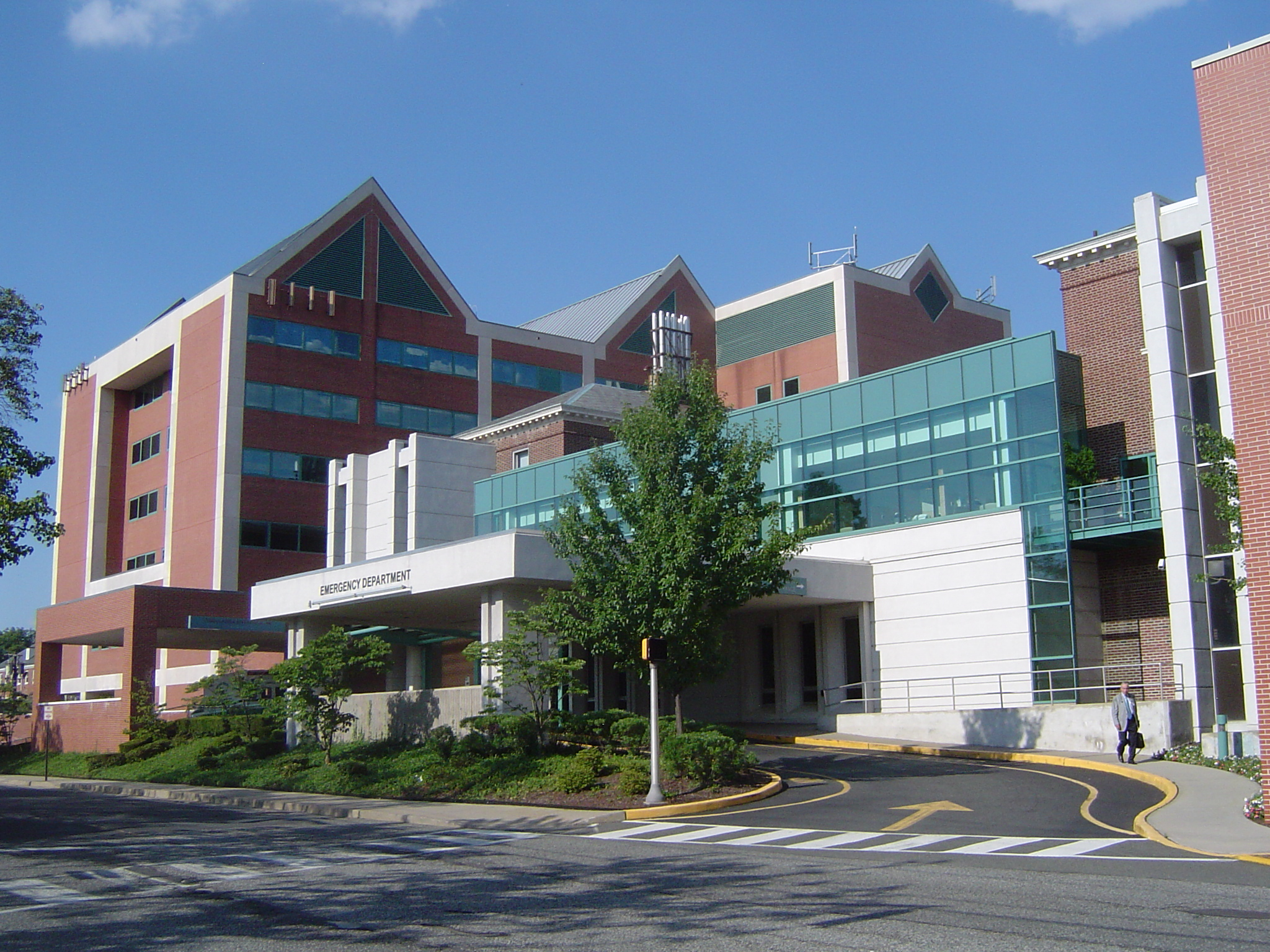

Geography
- Location: Glen Ridge, New Jersey, U.S.
- Coordinates: 40.812°N 74.204°W

Organisation
- Care system: Medicare (US), Medicaid
- Type: Teaching
- Affiliated university: New York Institute of Technology College of Osteopathic Medicine

Services
- Standards: JCAHO
- Emergency department: Yes
- Beds: 365

History
- Founded: in 1891 as "The Mountainside Hospital"

Links
- Website: www.mountainsidemedicalcenter.com

Hackensack Meridian Health Mountainside Medical Center, also known as Mountainside Hospital, is an acute-care hospital located in Glen Ridge, New Jersey, United States. The hospital has 365 beds and serves Northern Essex County. A part of the Hackensack University Health Network, Mountainside Hospital is one of only two for-profit hospitals in New Jersey. It is also a clinical campus and affiliate of the New York Institute of Technology College of Osteopathic Medicine and provides clinical clerkship education for the medical school's osteopathic medical students.

== About ==
As of 2020, Mountainside Hospital provides 12 specialties and hosts 47 full-time interns and residents. It is designated a community perinatal center, intermediate, and a primary stroke center.

In 2021 it received from the American Heart Association and American Stroke Association a Gold Plus Quality Achievement Award and a Type 2 Diabetes Honor Roll Award.

It owns and operates two centers for immediate injury and acute illness care, one in Bloomfield and the other in Clifton.

== History ==
In the summer of 1890, Margaret Jane Merewether Power of Montclair, New Jersey came upon a small child who had fallen from a third story window, and was in need of serious medical attention. Upset at the fact that there was no nearby health care facility, Mrs. Power called upon other ladies in her social circle, and vowed to work toward a solution to the problem. In 1891, a three-story building was purchased and prepared to care for patients. Dr. John J.H. Love was named the first President of the Medical and Surgical Staff of "The Mountainside Hospital". The word "The" was later dropped from the hospital's formal name, making it simply "Mountainside Hospital".

On May 31, 2007, it was purchased by Merit Health Systems, a privately owned for-profit Louisville, Kentucky hospital management company that acquires, owns and operates community hospitals. Merit continued to operate the hospital until February 1, 2012, when ownership of the hospital was transferred to Montclair Health System, LLC, a joint venture between LHP Hospital Group, Inc. (LHP) (now Ardent Health Services) and Hackensack Meridian Health, who together also operate Hackensack University Medical Center at Pascack Valley in Westwood, New Jersey.

== In popular culture ==
On the American television drama series The Sopranos, A.J. Soprano is placed in the psychiatric ward at Mountainside Hospital after he tries to drown himself in the family pool. Later, his father Tony Soprano gets a bill of $2,200 per day for warehousing his son at the mental health facility.

== People ==
- Kevin O'Connor, D.O., physician to President Joe Biden, completed his family medicine residency at Mountainside Medical Center and his doctorate medical education at the hospital's affiliated New York Institute of Technology College of Osteopathic Medicine.
