= Jersey Shore University Medical Center =

- Hackensack Meridian Health

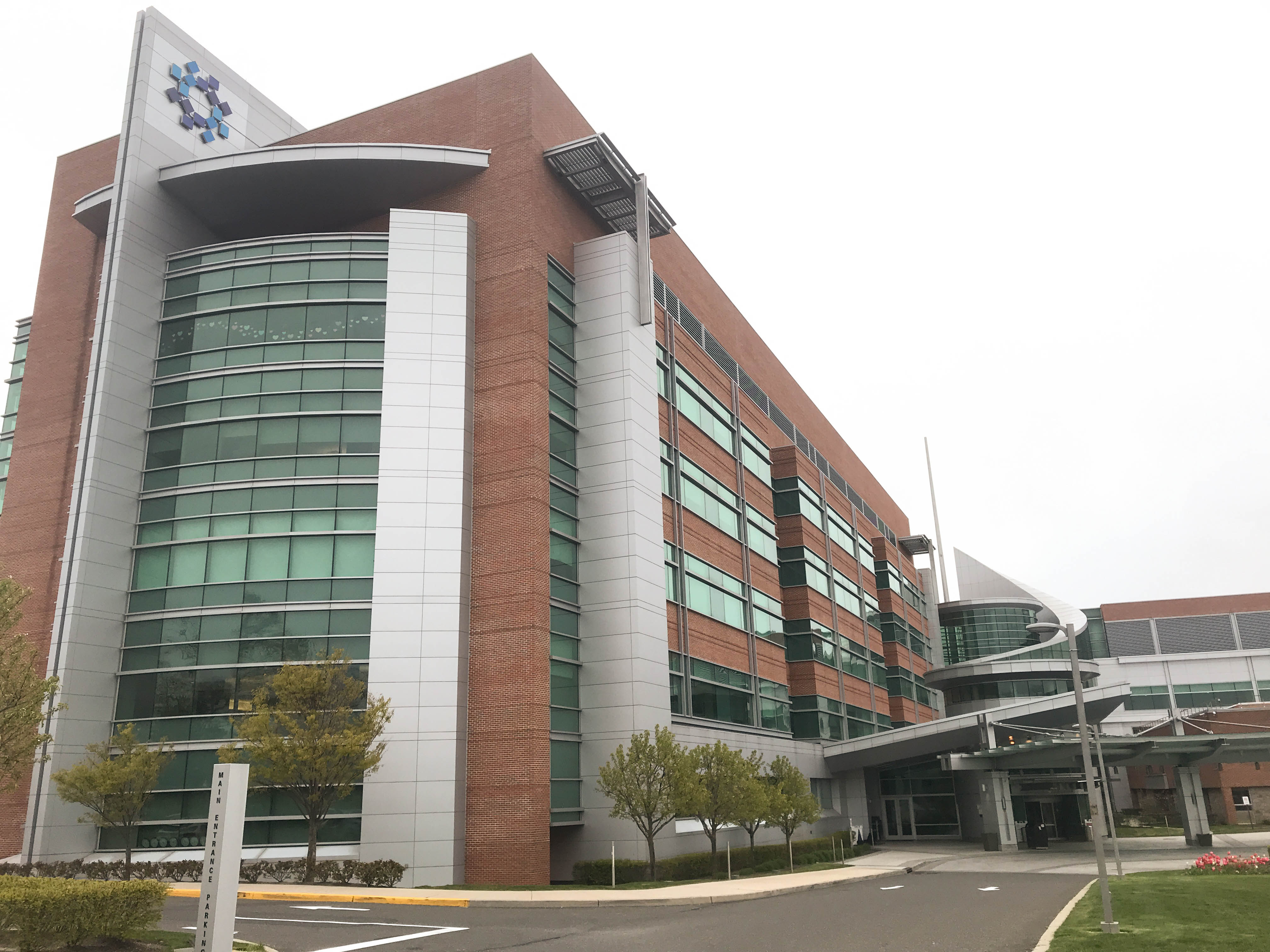
- The main entrance of the hospital, known as the northwest pavilion.

Geography
- Location: 1945 Route 33; Neptune Township, New Jersey, United States
- Coordinates: 40.208854°N 74.041092°W

Organization
- Type: Teaching
- Affiliated university: Hackensack Meridian School of Medicine

Services
- Emergency department: Level I Adult Trauma Center / Level I Pediatric Trauma Center (see K. Hovnanian Children's Hospital)
- Beds: 691

Helipads
- Helipad: FAA LID: NJ05
Number	Length		Surface
Number	ft	m	Surface
H1	44 x 44	13 × 13	mats

History
- Former name: Jersey Shore Medical Center
- Founded: 1904

Links
- Website: Official website
- Lists: Hospitals in the United States

Jersey Shore University Medical Center (JSUMC) is a 691-bed non-profit, tertiary research and academic medical center located in Neptune Township, New Jersey, servicing coastal New Jersey and the Central Jersey area. JSUMC is the region’s only university-level academic medical center. The hospital is part of the Hackensack Meridian Health Health System and is the system's second largest hospital. JSUMC is affiliated with the Hackensack Meridian School of Medicine. JSUMC is also an ACS designated level I trauma center with a rooftop helipad handling medevac patients. Attached to the medical center is the K. Hovnanian Children's Hospital that treats infants, children, adolescents, and young adults up to the age of 21. JSUMC is listed as a major teaching and tertiary care hospital and has a staff of 127 interns and residents. It is a member of the Council of Teaching Hospitals and Health Systems.

== History ==
Jersey Shore University Medical Center was founded in 1904 in Spring Lake, and originally named the Ann May Memorial Homeopathic Hospital. In 1932, it was moved to Neptune and renamed Raleigh Fitkin-Paul Morgan Memorial Hospital. In 1966, it was renamed the Jersey Shore Medical Center – Fitkin Hospital. In 2003, it was renamed Jersey Shore University Medical Center to reflect its heightened commitment to teaching.

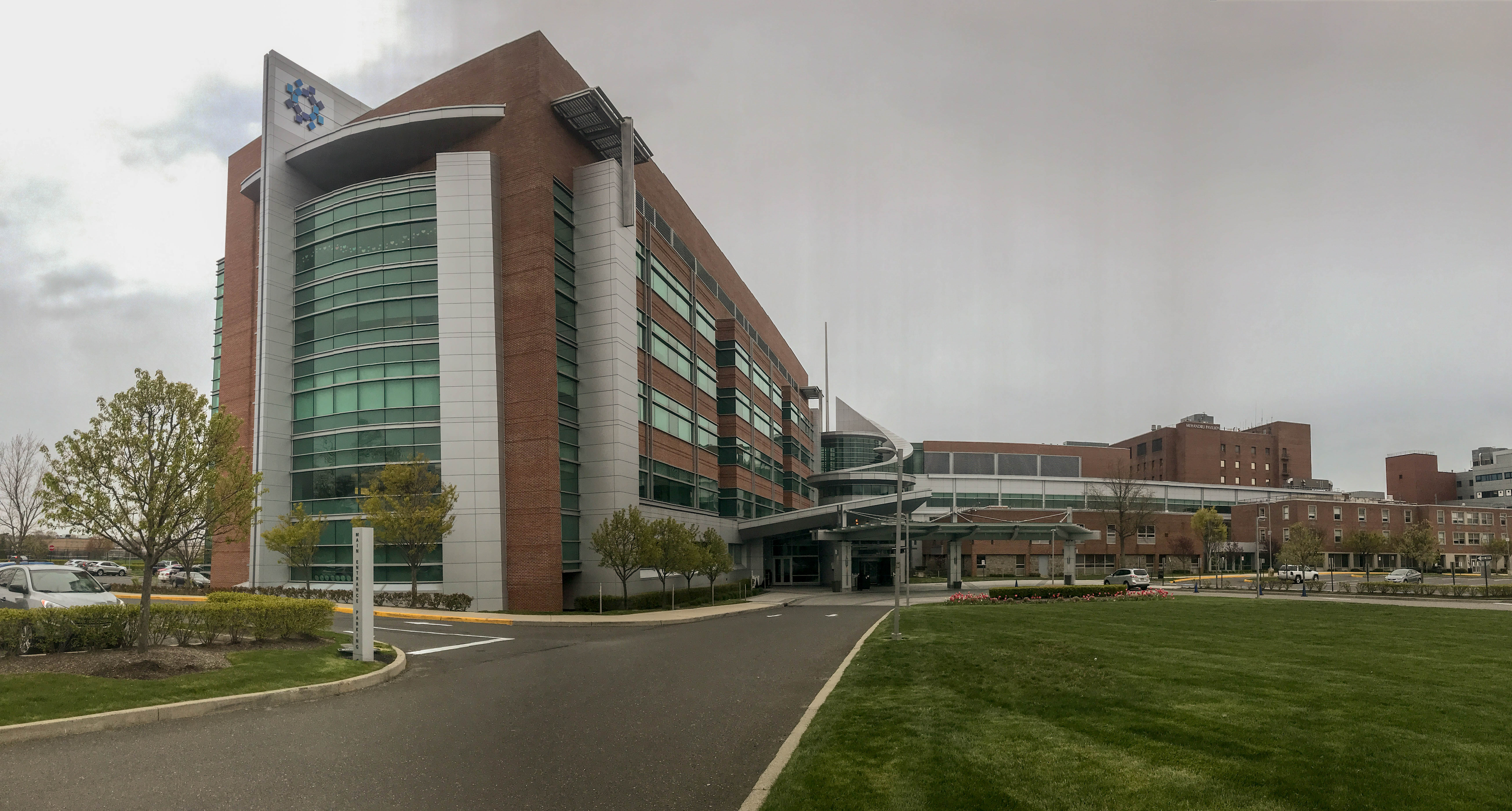
Panorama of 2009 expansion to the hospital. (Northwest Pavilion)

In 2009, the hospital expanded to include a 5-story tower with patient care units and an emergency department with 10 pediatric beds, cardiology units, and pediatric units. The expansion added 103 beds to the hospital and organized patient rooms into "neighborhoods" to ease patient anxiety. The design is recognized as an example of great hospital design.

Before merging with Hackensack University Medical Center, Meridian Health's flagship facility was JSUMC.

In 2019, the hospital once again expanded by building the 10 story, 300,000 square foot Healing Outpatient Experience (HOPE Tower) at a cost of $265 million. The HOPE Tower includes outpatient cancer care, maternity, pediatrics, doctors offices and high-tech academic and research space. As a part of the expansion, the HOPE tower includes a 200 seat auditorium named the John K. Lloyd Amphitheater after the former co-CEO of Hackensack Meridian Health.

In March 2020, JSUMC implemented strict visitation protocols to help reduce the spread of the 2020 COVID-19 pandemic. In April 2020 the hospital drew criticism when they fired a nurse after the nurse voiced concerns over the lack of protective equipment (PPE) available to staff. A month later more employees came forward to criticize the hospital's PPE actions in the matter.

In early 2021, JSUMC opened a new cardiac catheterization lab as part of the first stage of a $45 million cardiovascular expansion scheduled to be completed in July 2023. In 2003, the hospital performed 636 cardiac operations, the 5th most in the New York-New Jersey region according to a New York Times heart study.

== Services ==
Jersey Shore University Medical Center include Addiction Recovery, Bariatric Surgery, Cancer Care, Cardiac Surgery, Cardiovascular Program, Diabetes, Dialysis Center, Emergency Department, Endocrine Surgery, Family Health, Gastroenterology, Gynecological Surgery, Hepatobiliary Surgery, Hospitalist Program, Imaging, Infectious Disease, Inpatient Psychiatric Unit, Laboratory Services, Level II Trauma Center, Maternity, Medical Services, Neuroscience Institute, Orthopedics, Pancreatic Surgery, Parathyroid Surgery, Pediatrics, Physical Therapy, Pulmonary Rehabilitation, Rehabilitation Services, Robotic Surgery, Speech Pathology, Thoracic Surgery, Thyroid Surgery, Urologic Surgery, and Vascular Surgery.

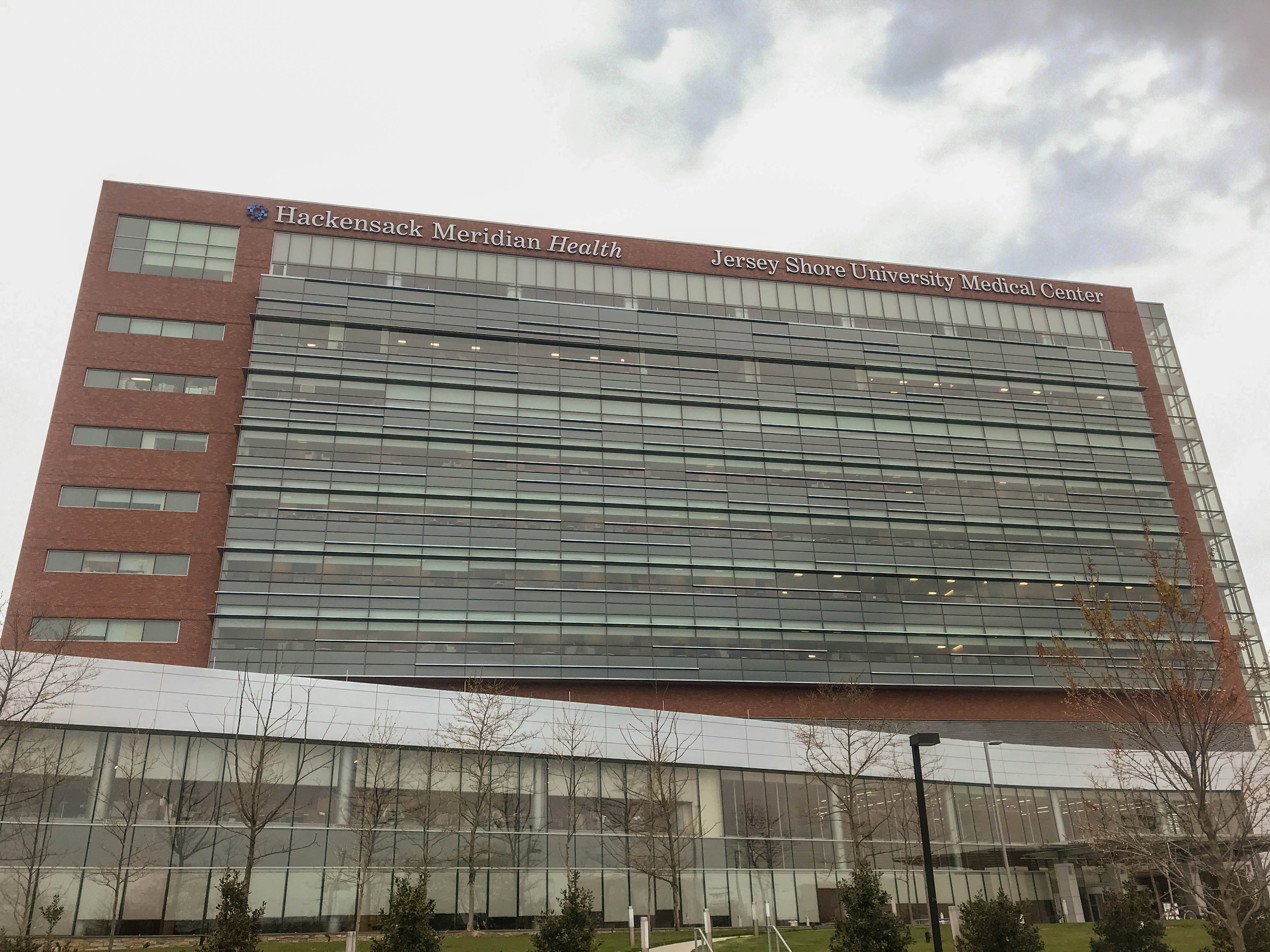
The HOPE tower.

== Awards and rankings ==
From 2017 to 2019, the hospital was rated as #4 in New Jersey by U.S. News & World Report.

In 2020, Jersey Shore University Medical Center was ranked fifth of New Jersey hospitals and second in the Central Jersey area hospitals by U.S. News & World Report.

In 2020, the hospital was ranked #39 nationally in orthopedics by U.S. News & World Report. Also in 2020, the hospital received a bronze performance achievement award from the American College of Cardiology, one of 35 hospitals nationwide to receive the award. In fall 2020, Jersey Shore University Medical Center was given a "B" grade by patient safety organization "The Leapfrog Group." In 2020 it ranked in the top 10% in CDC's Maternity Practices in Infant Nutrition and Care (mPINC) survey of national hospitals.

In 2021 it was given a grade A by the Leapfrog patient safety organization.

== K. Hovnanian Children's Hospital ==
The K. Hovnanian Children's Hospital at Jersey Shore University Medical Center is a pediatric acute care hospital located in Neptune Township, New Jersey. The hospital has 88 beds and provides comprehensive pediatric specialties and sub-specialties to infants, children, teens, and young adults aged 0–21 throughout Coastal New Jersey. It is affiliated with both the Hackensack Meridian School of Medicine and Robert Wood Johnson Medical School, and is a member of Hackensack Meridian Health. K. Hovnanian Children's Hospital features the only pediatric trauma center in the region, and 1 of 3 in the state.

== In popular culture ==
The hospital was shown in a few episodes of The Learning Channels' highly rated reality program, "Trauma: Life in the E.R."

== See also ==
- Hackensack Meridian Health
- K. Hovnanian Children's Hospital
