= Bayshore Medical Center =

- Hackensack Meridian Health

Geography
- Location: Holmdel, New Jersey, United States
- Coordinates: 40.405782°N 74.191811°W

Organization
- Affiliated university: Hackensack Meridian School of Medicine

Services
- Beds: 169

History
- Founded: 1972

Links
- Website: www.bayshorehospital.org
- Lists: Hospitals in New Jersey

Bayshore Medical Center, formerly known as Bayshore Community Hospital, is a 204-bed general medical and surgical hospital located on a 37-acre (15 ha) campus at 727 North Beers Street, in Holmdel, New Jersey, United States, near the Raritan Bayshore. Its services include cardiac catheterization, diagnostic Imaging, medical/surgical, behavioral health, emergency, laboratory and transitional care.

Bayshore Medical Center merged with Hackensack Meridian Health in 2019 and is affiliated with the Cancer Institute of New Jersey. In 2021 it was given a grade A by the Leapfrog patient safety organization.

== History ==
Bayshore Medical Center was founded in 1962. The center had major construction programs from 1977 to 1984. It started with a 10,000-square-foot (930 m^{2}) emergency room and general office expansion. The construction also added the center's north wing, adding 50 medical-surgical beds in addition to the renovation of all support services. Bayshore Medical Center's bed complement increased to 218.

In 1988, an Bayshore Medical Health Care Center opened with 120 skilled care beds. Later, a second floor was added with 60 residential beds. In 1992, 7 beds were added, increasing the beds to 225. Then, in 1996, an 11-bed long-term care ventilator unit was added. A state-of-the-art cardiac catheterization and digital angiography suite was made and opened in 1997. The Willows at Holmdel opened on the Bayshore campus in July 1999. In 2009, the center got a Gold Seal Accreditation from The Joint Commission. In September, the center joined the Meridian Health Family. In April 2012, Bayshore Medical Center established a pediatric care center, which treats children in a kid-friendly environment.
