= Bacharach Institute for Rehabilitation =

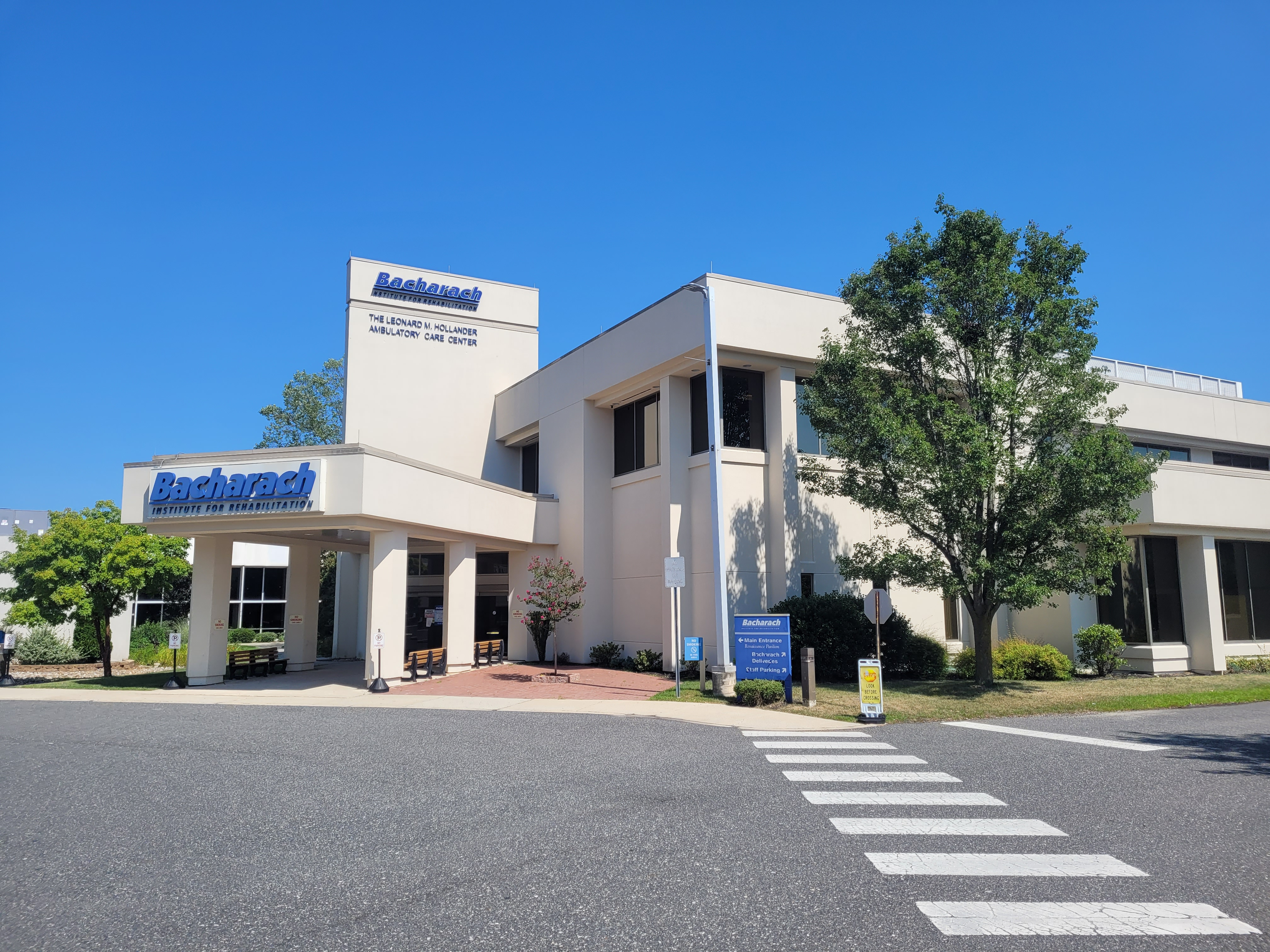
- The building that formerly housed the Bacharach Institute, in September 2023. Permanently closed.

- Bacharach Institute for Rehabilitation

Geography
- Location: Pomona, Atlantic County, New Jersey, United States
- Coordinates: 39.478639°N 74.540269°W

Organization
- Type: Specialist

Services
- Standards: Joint Commission
- Emergency department: No
- Beds: 82

History
- Founded: 1924
- Closed: 2023

Links
- Website: http://www.bacharach.org/
- Lists: Hospitals in New Jersey

Bacharach Institute for Rehabilitation was an inpatient and outpatient acute rehabilitation hospital with 50 beds located in the Pomona section of Galloway Township in Atlantic County, New Jersey, United States. The Bacharach Institute also included a subacute rehabilitation center called Renaissance Pavilion with 29 beds. Bacharach treated patients after strokes, spinal cord injuries, brain injuries, and other acute illnesses or traumas. In addition to the Bacharach Institute and Renaissance Pavilion in Pomona, the Bacharach Institute had fifteen physical and occupational therapy centers in South Jersey.

In February 2023, it was announced that the hospital would close permanently; the business had been buffeted by many of the challenges that smaller independent medical providers faced in the United States healthcare system, such as upgrading technology to the latest expensive standards as well as the impact of the coronavirus pandemic. It closed on March 31, 2023, concluding its 99 years of operation. Select Medical and AtlantiCare acquired some of Bacharach's assets, with AtlantiCare taking over the main Bacharach facility which adjoined the AtlantiCare Regional Medical Center, Mainland Campus. Select Medical has said it plans to open a new rehabilitation hospital in the area once it obtains regulatory approval.

== History ==
Bacharach Institute for Rehabilitation was founded in 1924 as a nonprofit hospital for children with polio. The hospital was well-regarded in its early decades, especially in attracting people from the Philadelphia area who felt the shore area was healthier than the industrialized city. The facility moved to its current location in Galloway in 1972, and pivoted away from its pediatric focus to expand to adult rehabilitative care as well.

Trends in American healthcare since 1990 have favored consolidation and large medical networks, resulting in the closure of independent providers not affiliated with a larger group. Bacharach closed in 2023, unable to maintain its finances. While the larger Select Medical group has said that they intend to open a replacement facility, there is little expectation that there will be much continuity with Bacharach: they have not transferred Bacharach's staff or made any commitments to hire many former Bacharach workers. AtlantiCare took over the main building Bacharach used, but as of 2023, it is not yet known how they will use the building.

== Renaissance Pavilion ==
Renaissance Pavilion was a subacute rehabilitation center with 29 beds.

== Physical and occupational therapy ==
Bacharach Institute had fifteen physical and occupational therapy centers in Atlantic City, Brigantine, Egg Harbor Township, Linwood, Pomona, Galloway, Margate, Marmora, Mays Landing, Somers Point, Cape May Court House, Ocean City, Vineland, Little Egg Harbor Township, and Manahawkin.
