= AtlantiCare Regional Medical Center, Mainland Campus =

Coordinates: 39.479°N 74.540°W

AtlantiCare Regional Medical Center Mainland Division
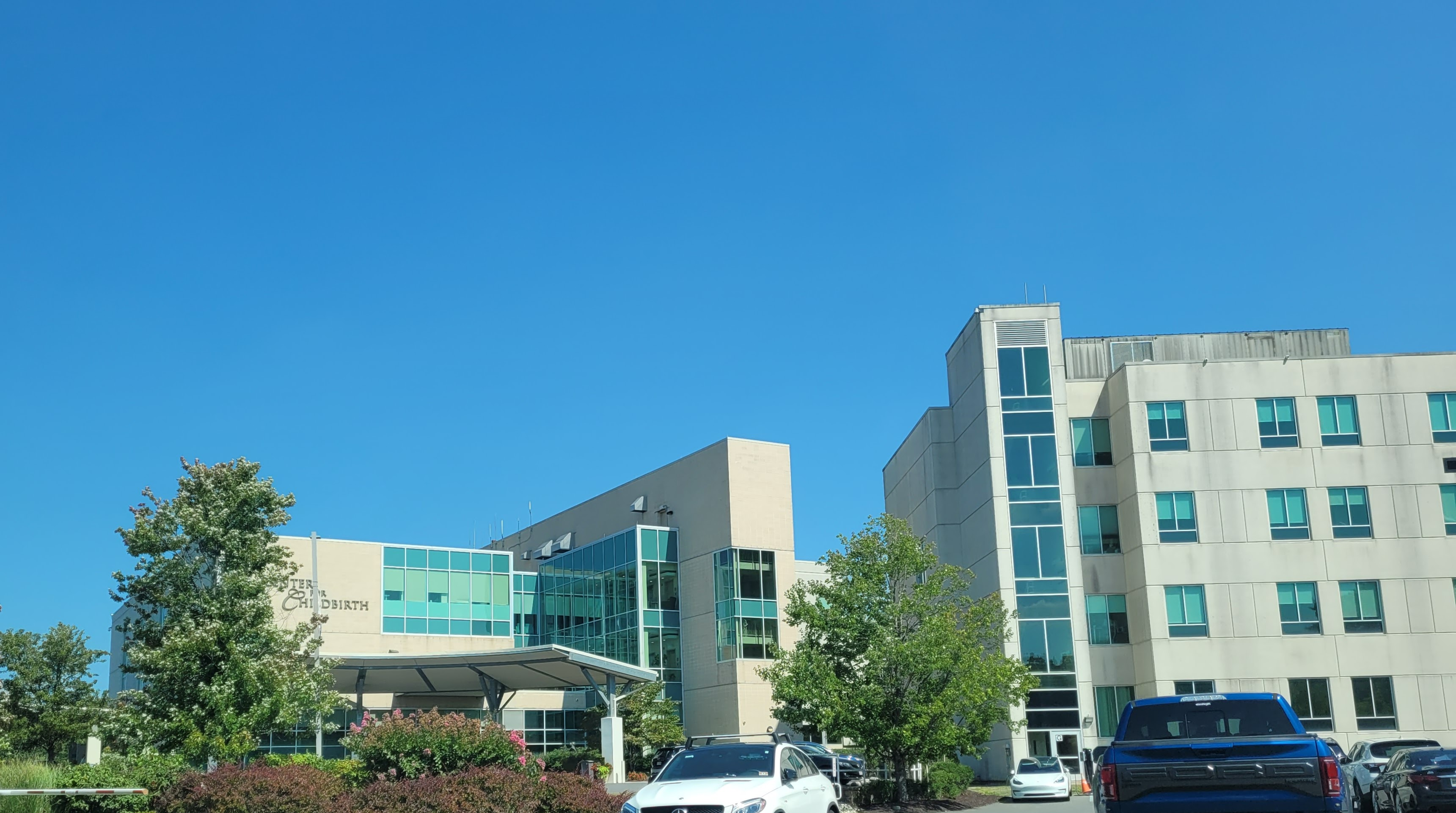
- Mainland Campus in September 2023

Geography
- Location: Pomona, Galloway Township, New Jersey, United States

Organization
- Type: General
- Affiliated university: Stockton University

Services
- Beds: 323

History
- Opened: 1975

Links
- Website: www.atlanticare.org/location/atlanticare-regional-medical-center-mainland-campus
- Lists: Hospitals in New Jersey

The AtlantiCare Regional Medical Center Mainland Campus is a 323-bed hospital located in the Pomona section of Galloway Township, New Jersey, United States. It opened in 1975 and is located on the campus of Stockton University. The Mainland Campus experienced a 44% growth in admissions from 1986 to 1992. From 1975–2023, the Mainland Campus adjoined the Bacharach Institute for Rehabilitation, which was situated in the same lot.

The Mainland Campus completed a $16 million modernization and renovation project in early 1992. Another expansion is in progress which started construction in 2022, with a planned completion date in 2025.

It contains several independent practices, including Rothman Orthopedics and Atlantic Emergency Associates.

== History ==
The Mainland Campus is the Galloway branch of AtlantiCare Regional Medical Center in Atlantic City, New Jersey. In 1975, when the campus opened, the Atlantic City hospital was known as "Atlantic City Medical Center".

== Gallery ==
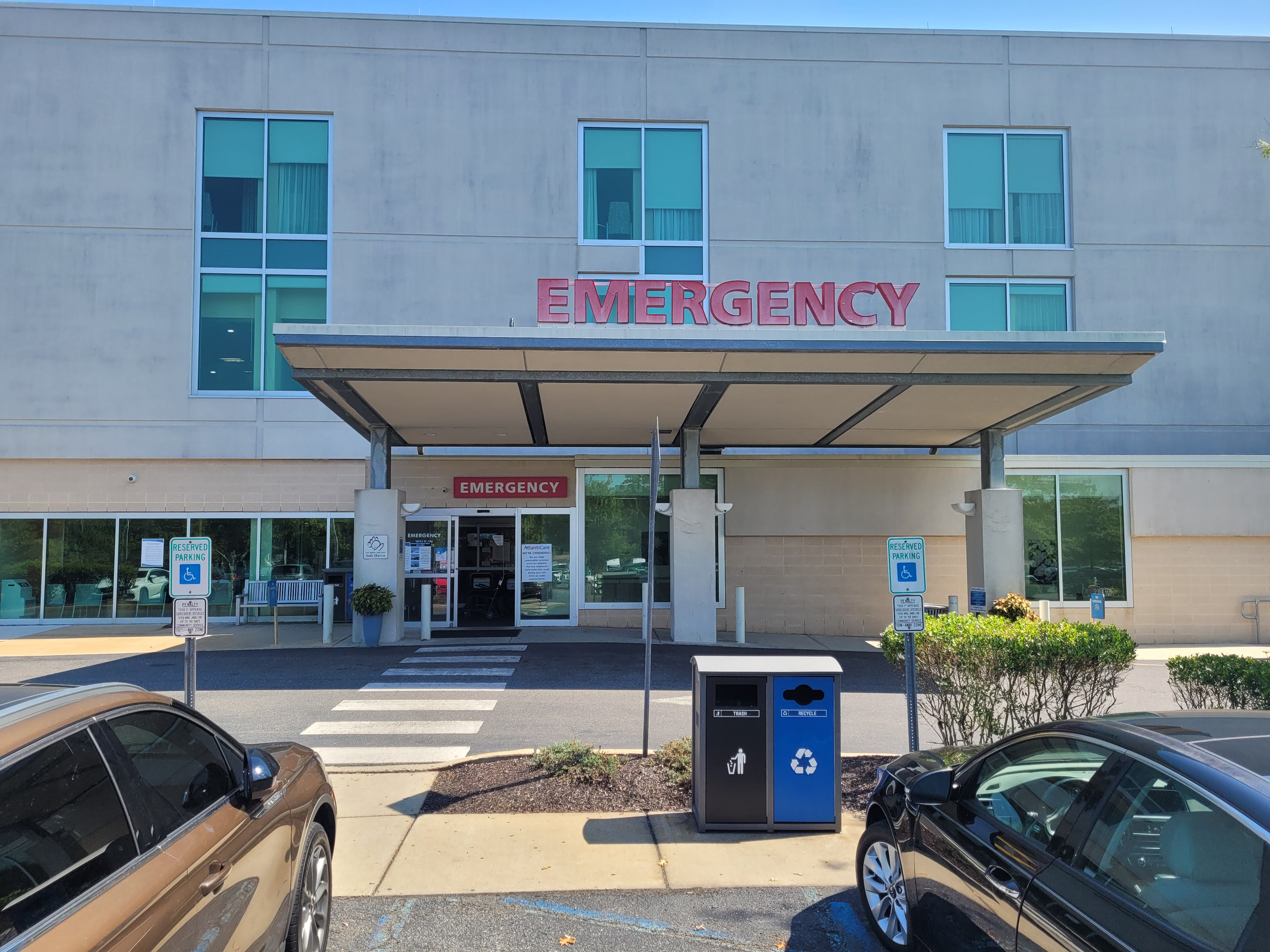
Atlanticare Mainland Division emergency entrance

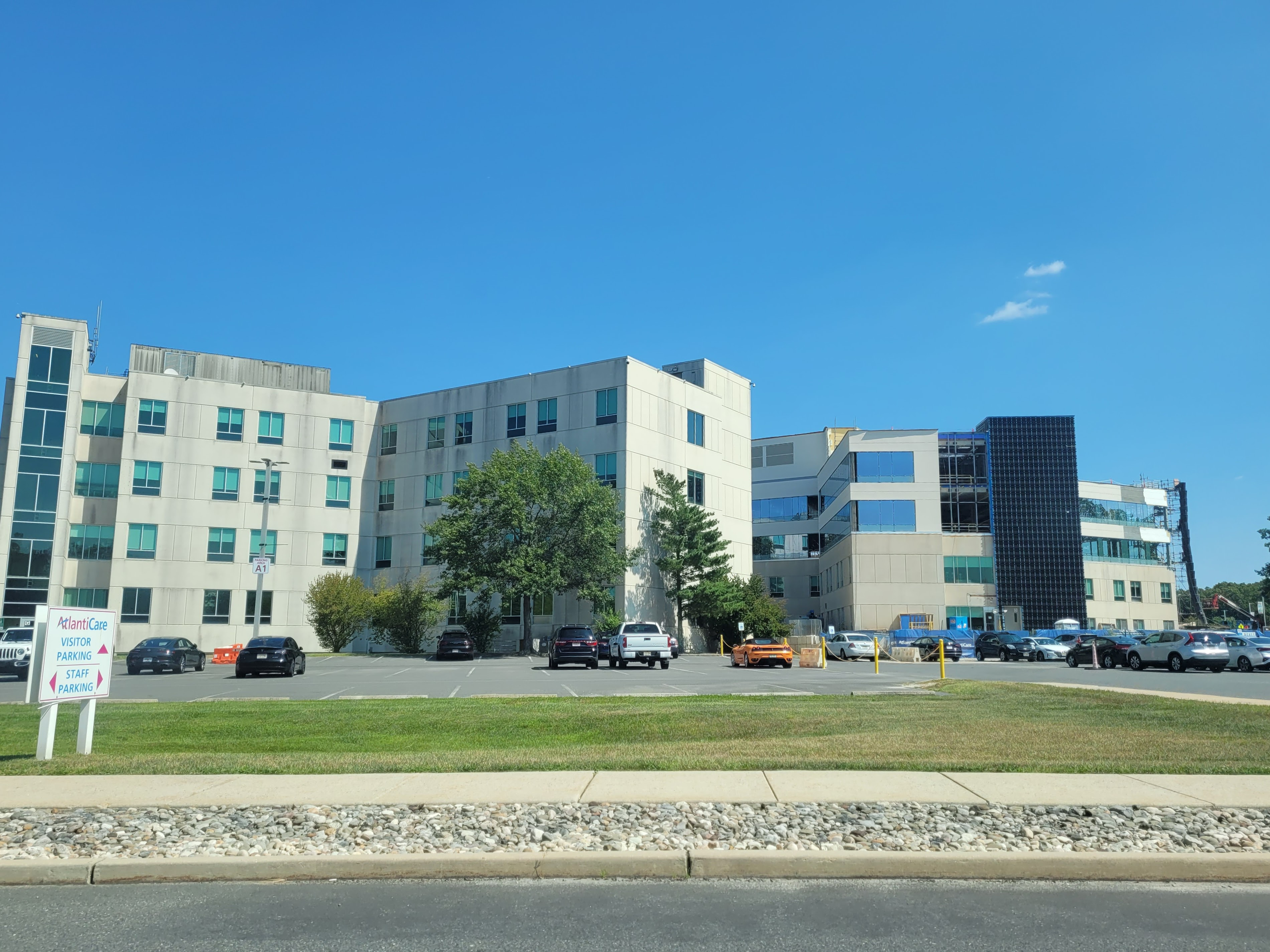
Atlanticare Mainland Division buildings; construction area on right

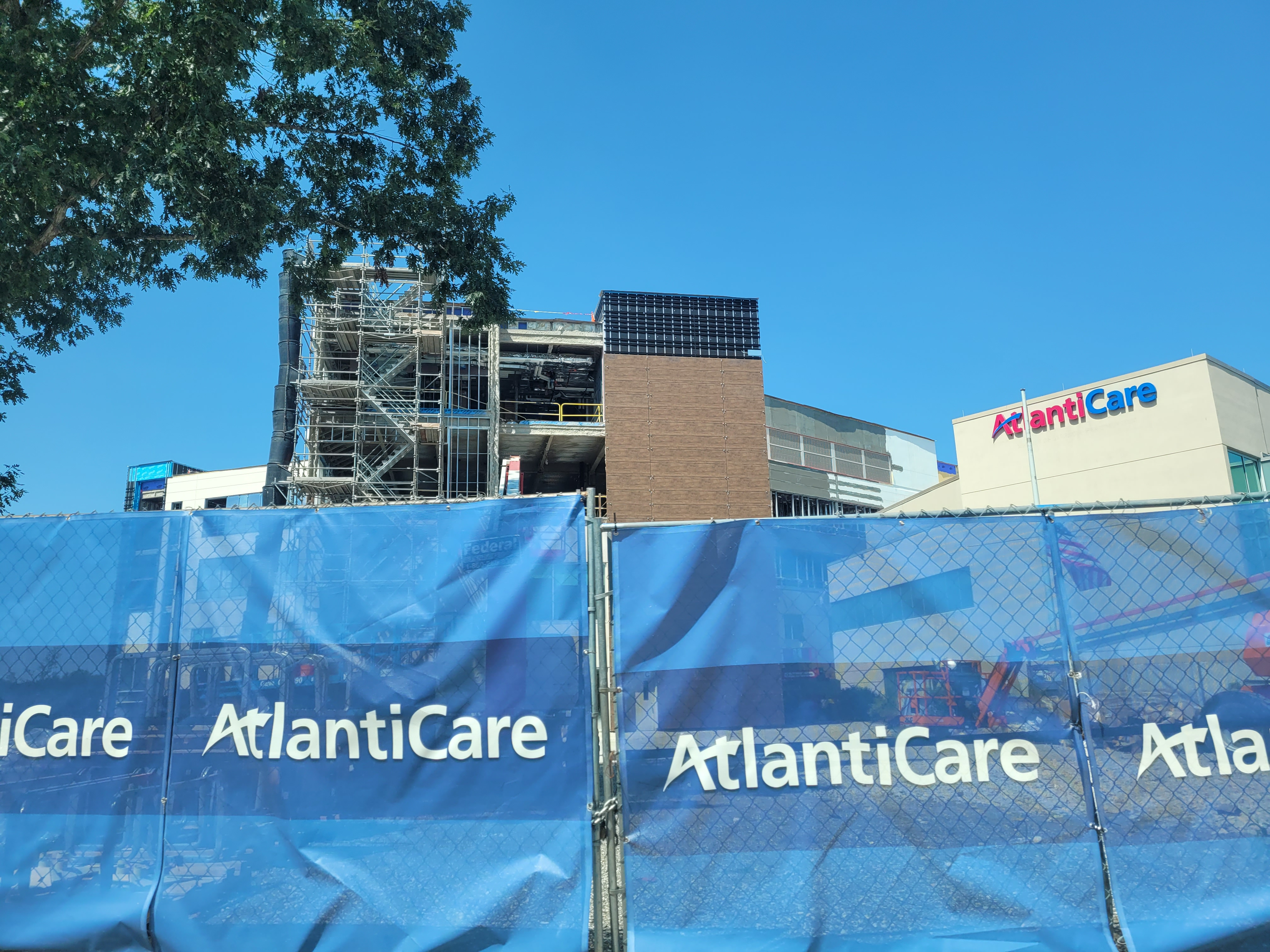
Atlanticare Mainland Division construction area

== See also ==
- List of hospitals in New Jersey
