= Peter Clive Mundy =

American developmental psychologist

- Born: United States
- Occupations: Developmental psychologist and an academic

Academic background
- Education: B.A. (Psychology); M.S. (Developmental Psychology); Ph.D. (Developmental Psychology)
- Alma mater: Stockton State College; University of Miami

Academic work
- Institutions: University of California, Davis

Peter Clive Mundy is an American developmental psychologist and an academic. He is an emeritus Distinguished Professor of education and psychiatry at University of California, Davis.

Mundy is most known for his works in child clinical psychology, and neurodevelopmental disorders. Among his authored works are his publications in academic journals, including Journal of Child Psychology and Psychiatry and Journal of Autism and Developmental Disorders as well as a book titled Autism and Joint Attention: Development, Neuroscience, and Clinical Fundamentals, The Guilford Press.

== Education ==
Mundy completed his BA in Psychology from Stockton State College in 1976, followed by an M.S. in developmental psychology from the University of Miami in 1979. Later, in 1981, he earned his Ph.D. in developmental psychology from the same institution.

== Career ==
Mundy began his academic career in 1981 at the University of California, Los Angeles (UCLA), where he held several positions. From 1991 to 1996, he assumed the role of associate professor of psychology and pediatrics at the University of Miami, subsequently being appointed as a professor of psychology and pediatrics from 1996 to 2007 at the same institution. From 2008 to 2023, he served as the professor and Lisa Capps Chair in Neurodevelopmental Disorders and Education at the UC Davis M.I.N.D. Institute, while concurrently holding a position as a Distinguished Professor of education and psychiatry from 2017 to 2023. Since 2024, he has held the title of emeritus Distinguished Professor of education and psychiatry at UC Davis.

Mundy served as the director of the Psychological Services Center in the Department of Psychology at the University of Miami from 1991 to 1999. Concurrently, he held appointments as the vice-president of International Society for Autism Research between 1997 and 1998, founding director of the Center for Autism and Related Disabilities from 1993 to 2007. He developed the Marino Autism Research Institute at the University of Miami, serving as its founding director from 2005 to 2007. Subsequently, he was appointed as the director for Educational Research at UC Davis M.I.N.D Institute from 2008 to 2023. During this time, he concurrently served as the associate dean for Academic Personnel and Research in the School of Education at UC Davis from 2016 to 2019. He also held an appointment as the president of International Society of Autism Research between 2019 and 2021.

== Research ==
In his early research from 1979 to 1981, Mundy concentrated on assessing and aiding children with intricate developmental disabilities at the Linda Ray Intervention Center, part of the Mailman Center at the University of Miami. Alongside Jeff Siebert and Ann Hogan, he contributed to shaping the Early Social Communication Scales (ESCS). This development influenced the understanding of autism spectrum development, particularly in terms of early social attention and cognitive distinctions as well as the design of the Autism Diagnostic Observation Scale 2. In 1981, he began his autism research at UCLA where he examined how differences in nonverbal indicating behaviors are a key characteristic distinguishing young autistic children from typically developing children and a control group, suggesting it as a significant marker in diagnosing autism. Specifically, he explored differences in social interactions between young autistic children and typically developing or intellectually disabled peers, highlighting a significant difference social attention coordination behaviors among autistic children during interactions with caregivers. His 1990 collaborative work with M Sigman and C Kasari investigated the correlation between gestural joint attention skills and language development in autistic children compared to children with intellectual and developmental disabilities (IDD). The study found deficits in gestural joint attention skills in autistic children and identified gestural nonverbal joint attention as a significant predictor of language development in this group. Furthermore, he also examined how autistic children, compared to typically developing children with IDD, demonstrated difficulties in displaying positive affect during joint attention situations, suggesting a link between joint attention deficits and disturbances in motivation and the experience of a sense of intersubjectivity.

Mundy, in his 1994 research examined joint attention deficits in autistic children, particularly focusing on nonverbal aspects and their relationship to cognitive abilities, symptom presentation, and parental observations of social and communication-related symptoms, suggesting that deficits in children's tendency to initiate bids for joint attention may be the most pronounced and consistent across developmental levels than their tendency to respond to joint attention bids. Later in 1998, he explored the relationship between individual differences in joint attention skills, particularly following gaze and pointing, and their predictive role in receptive language development, while also exploring whether various joint attention skills reflect distinct or common cognitive processes in early social-communication development. While examining the development of joint attention in infants aged 9 to 18 months, his 2007 study found that initiating and responding to joint attention displayed different patterns of early development but that early developments in both types of joint attention predicted language development at 24 months. Moreover, in the same year, he explored the interplay between joint attention, social cognition, and the shared neural mechanisms involved, highlighting the significance of integrated attention networks in infancy for the development of social understanding and its implications for conditions like autism.

In 2009, Mundy provided a discussion of the role of joint attention in autism, emphasizing its dynamic and transactional development from infancy, its neural underpinnings, and significance for social cognition. This paper suggested that differences in joint attention were central to autism, likely began to develop by 4 to 6 months and were connected to differences in learning and social competence in autism. Subsequently, he pioneered the use of virtual reality methodology in the study of social attention in autism. He also examined how the learning differences of autism might impact the reading profiles of 8-16-year-old children with higher functioning autism spectrum disorders (HFASD), as well the connection between social symptoms and reading. His research team observed four distinct reading profiles and significant differences between these profiles and ASD symptomatology. In 2022 while being part of The Lancet Commission, his work discussed the global significance of autism. The study also advocated for increased investment in scientific research and improvements in social and service systems to enhance the quality of life for individuals with autism and their families.

== Awards and honors ==
- 2007 – Lisa Capps Endowed Chair for Research on Education and Developmental Disorders, UC Davis
- 2010 – Simpson-Ramsey Lecture award; University of Alabama at Birmingham
- 2010 – Leonard and Frances Blackman Lecture award, Columbia University Teachers College
- 2024 – Lifetime Achievement Award, International Society of Autism Research

== Bibliography ==
=== Books ===
- Autism and joint attention : development, neuroscience, and clinical fundamentals (2016) ISBN 9781462525096

=== Selected articles ===
- Mundy, P., Sigman, M., Ungerer, J., & Sherman, T. (1986). Defining the social deficits of autism: The contribution of non‐verbal communication measures. Journal of child psychology and psychiatry, 27(5), 657–669.
- Kasari, C., Sigman, M., Mundy, P., & Yirmiya, N. (1990). Affective sharing in the context of joint attention interactions of normal, autistic, and mentally retarded children. Journal of autism and developmental disorders, 20(1), 87–100.
- Mundy, P., Sigman, M., & Kasari, C. (1990). A longitudinal study of joint attention and language development in autistic children. Journal of Autism and developmental Disorders, 20(1), 115–128.
- Mundy, P., Block, J., Delgado, C., Pomares, Y., Van Hecke, A. V., & Parlade, M. V. (2007). Individual differences and the development of joint attention in infancy. Child development, 78(3), 938–954.
- Mundy, P., & Newell, L. (2007). Attention, joint attention, and social cognition. Current directions in psychological science, 16(5), 269–274.
