= Saatkamp =

Saatkamp is a surname. Notable people with the surname include:

- Herman Saatkamp (born 1942), American university president
- Lucas Saatkamp (born 1986), Brazilian volleyball player
