= Vera King Farris =

American academic administrator

President of the Richard Stockton College of New Jersey
- In office May 25, 1983 – June 3, 2003
- Preceded by: Peter M. Mitchell
- Succeeded by: Herman Saatkamp

Personal details
- Born: July 18, 1938 Atlantic City, New Jersey, U.S.
- Died: November 28, 2009 (aged 71) Pomona, New Jersey, U.S.
- Children: King Farris; three grandchildren.
- Education: Tuskegee Institute; University of Massachusetts Amherst
- Profession: Distinguished Professor and President Emerita

Vera King Farris (July 18, 1938 – November 28, 2009) was the third president of the Richard Stockton College of New Jersey from May 25, 1983, to June 3, 2003. She was the first female African-American president of a New Jersey public college and one of the first in the nation.

A scientist with a doctorate in zoology, she taught at State University of New York at Stony Brook and Brockport, and the University of Michigan. She advanced into administrative positions, serving as vice president for academic affairs at Kean University.

== Early life and education ==
Farris was a native of Atlantic City, New Jersey, and attended Atlantic City High School, graduating third in the class of 1954. She attended Tuskegee Institute (now Tuskegee University), graduating with a degree in biology in 1959. She later earned master's and doctorate degrees in zoology from the University of Massachusetts Amherst.

== Academic career ==
Farris held administrative and teaching positions at the State University of New York at Stony Brook and Brockport, and the University of Michigan.

== College administration ==
Farris served at Kean College (now Kean University) as vice president for academic affairs.

In 1983, she was selected as president of Richard Stockton College of New Jersey, serving until 2003. According to the college, she was the first female African-American president of a New Jersey public college, and one of the first in the nation. Farris directed the college through a period of expansion and change, increasing enrollment and adding to facilities. She emphasized academic excellence and is credited with leading the college to become a "nationally ranked institution, and increasing SAT scores, minority enrollment and retention."

As a professional scientist, she supported major initiatives in sustainability, such as "one of the world’s largest geothermal heating and cooling systems." Capital construction during her term included the Sports Center, West Quad Health Sciences Building, and the Arts and Sciences Building, designed by the internationally known architect, Michael Graves. The college also adopted practices to reduce consumption of fossil fuels. Construction of residential buildings increased the appeal of the campus for students.

Farris established "one of the nation's first Holocaust Resource Centers and the first Master's program in Holocaust and Genocide Studies." She also endowed a chair in the department in her mother's name.

== Civic life ==
Farris was the first African-American woman selected for the board of directors of Flagstar Companies, owner of Denny's Restaurants. She was a member of Seaview Baptist Church in Linwood, New Jersey, for more than 25 years.

Farris retired to Galloway Township, New Jersey. Upon her retirement in 2003, the college renamed its main road "Vera King Farris Drive" in her honor. She died on November 28, 2009, in Pomona, New Jersey, at the age of 71 after a brief illness and is buried in Germania Cemetery in Galloway Township.

== Legacy and honors ==
- 1992, named New Jersey Woman of the Year.
- 1994, named New Jersey Policymaker of the Year by Executive Women of New Jersey.
- Through the years, she was awarded multiple honorary doctorate degrees from other educational institutions.
- 2003, Stockton College named its main road as "Vera King Farris Drive" in her honor.

2003- Stockton college paid 75k to settle a sexual harassment lawsuit after a male vice president rejected her advances.
