= WLFR =

- Pomona, New Jersey; United States
- Broadcast area: Atlantic City
- Frequency: 91.7 MHz
- Branding: Lake Fred Radio

Programming
- Format: Variety

Ownership
- Owner: Stockton University

History
- First air date: October 16, 1984
- Call sign meaning: Lake Fred Radio

Technical information
- Licensing authority: FCC
- Facility ID: 63469
- Class: A
- ERP: 820 watts
- HAAT: 45.0 meters
- Transmitter coordinates: 39°28′45.00″N 74°32′23.00″W

Links
- Public license information: Public file; LMS

WLFR (91.7 FM) is a college radio station broadcasting a Variety format. The station is owned by Stockton University, licensed to the Pomona section of Galloway Township, New Jersey, United States, and serves the Atlantic City area.

The call letters stand for "Lake Fred Radio," named after a lake located on campus. The station began broadcasting on October 16, 1984, a few weeks after having been granted its license by the FCC on October 3, 1984.

It offers a wide range of formats from rock to country to alternative to jazz and various other genres.

== Call Sign ==
WLFR's callsign, Lake Fred Radio, comes from one of the lakes on Stockton University's campus. Although there has been some speculation about the origin of Lake Fred's name, the likeliest source was Frederic "Eric" Sommer, who named the lake after himself in 1973. Before this, students would refer to this body of water as "Lake Stockton" and "College Lake." Because it is a prominent topographic landmark, campus organizations like WFLR have named themselves after it.

== History ==
WLFR started in a small cabin located in the woods east of the dorm C and D in 1974–1975. The Radio Club got permission to renovate the cabin and added two small studios and a control room. An A/C system was donated and the entrance room housed the record collection. Records arrived on a daily basis directly from the record companies free of charge. The station was called WSSR - Stockton State Radio.

The broadcast medium was via dedicated phone lines to each of the dorm buildings where AM "carrier-current" transmitters beamed the signal out via the building wires. The hand build tube transmitters were purchased from another state college that didn't need them anymore.

The tech team got a budget to purchase two broadcast grade turntables, a mixing console and a Revox 77 tape recorder. Things really took off when an endless loop tape deck was added for jingles and promotional spots. Endless tapes had 30 and 60 second runtime.

The turntables were "queued up" for each song to be played. That means that the needle was placed in the groove of the record and spun by hand to find the start of the song, then 1/2 turn added for the start up time of the turntable.

The faders in the mixing console controlled the turntable motor allowing the disk jockey to on cue to just raise the volume on the mixer witch in turn started the turntable. This allowed the perfect crossover from song to song or speech to song.

Advisor to the club was Charlie Hirsch, husband of one of the professors. He also helped with the solar heated cabin.

== FCC Application ==
The original FCC application was submitted 1975–1976 by the Radio Club. At the time, Pomona and the surrounding area did not support the FCC population requirement. The only way to fulfill the requirement was to include Atlantic City in the coverage. This was achieved by using a directional antenna that beamed the signal in direction of Atlantic City. Today WLFR uses a non-directional antenna to beam out sound waves with transmitter output power: 1.00 kW.

== WLFR ==
At some point in time the group of cabins was demolished and the AM transmitters retired. Today the radio station is housed in the main building of the campus. WLFR is located in Suite 205 of the campus center

As of 2015, the old equipment from the cabin was still in use at WLFR in a secondary studio downstairs from the main studio.
