= Marcus Major =

American author

- Born: Fort Bragg, North Carolina
- Education: Richard Stockton College
- Occupation: Author
- Known for: Novelist

Marcus Major is an American author. He is best known for writing novels pertaining to African-American love interests.

== Biography ==
Born in Fort Bragg, North Carolina, Major lived a transient childhood while following his father (who was in the military) to various destinations across the United States. After high school, Major attended Richard Stockton College, in Pomona, New Jersey, From Richard Stockton, he received a degree in literature and a teaching certificate in African- American Studies. After college, he began teaching elementary and middle school in Newark, New Jersey. Major began writing his first novel in 1998.

== Bibliography ==
- Good Peoples (1991)
- Got to Be Real: Four Original Love Stories (2000) ("Kenya and Amir" is his contribution.)
- Four Guys and Trouble (2001), winner of Blackboard's Novel of the Year Award
- A Man Most Worthy (2002),
- A Family Affair (2003)
