= Donald J. Farish =

Canadian American biologist and zoologist (1942–2018)

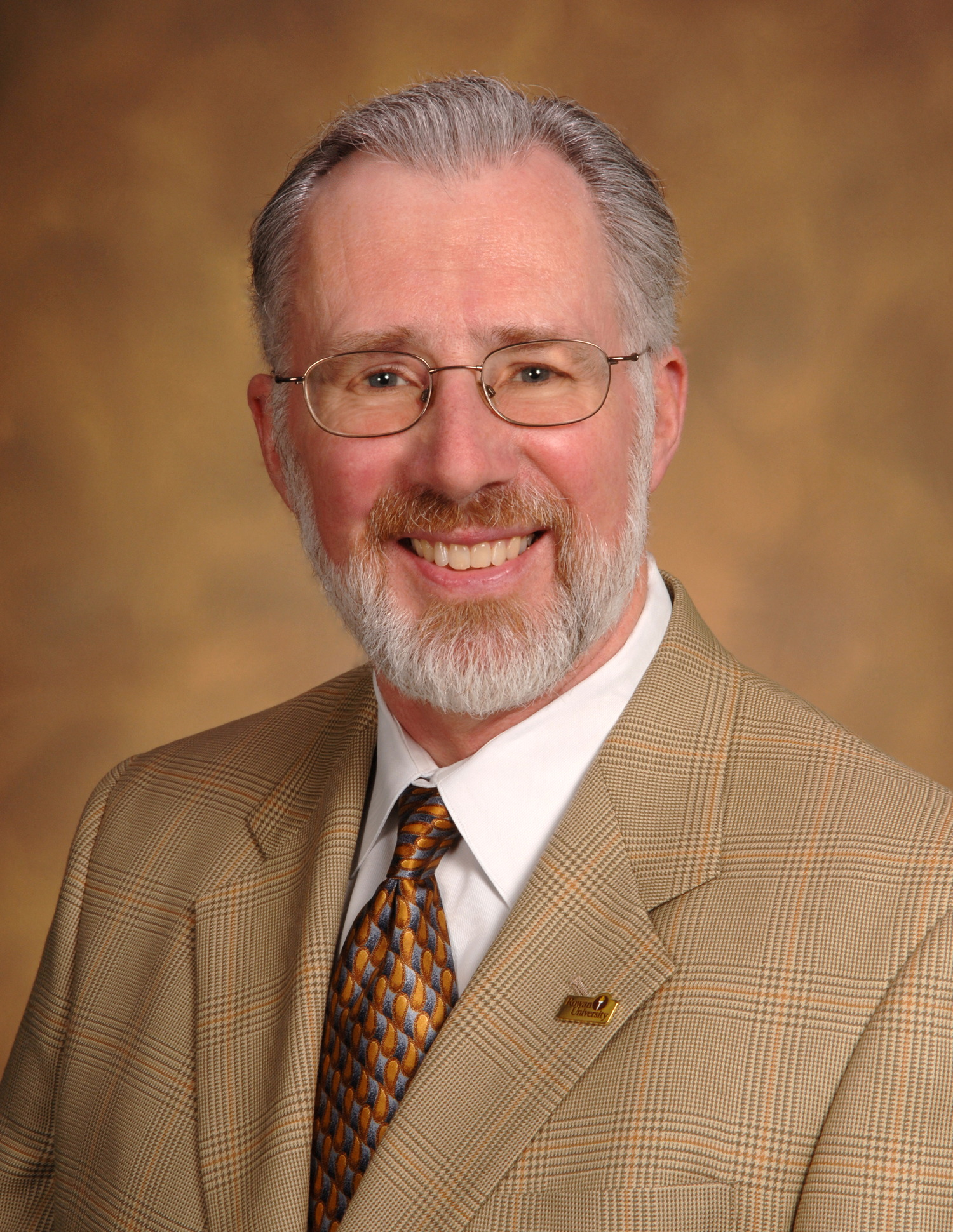
- Farish in 2006
- Born: December 7, 1942; Winnipeg, Manitoba, Canada
- Died: July 5, 2018 (aged 75); Boston, Massachusetts, U.S.
- Education: University of British Columbia (BSc); North Carolina State University (MS); Harvard University (PhD); University of Missouri (JD)
- Scientific career
- Fields: Biology
- Workplaces: President, Roger Williams University (2011-2018); President, Rowan University (1998 to 2011)

Donald J. Farish (December 7, 1942 – July 5, 2018) was a Canadian American biologist and zoologist who served as the 10th president of Roger Williams University in Bristol, Rhode Island. He was president of Rowan University in Glassboro, New Jersey from 1998 to 2011.

== Early life and education ==
Farish was born in Winnipeg, Manitoba, Canada, in 1942 and moved to Vancouver at age 16. He won a scholarship through a national competition to become the first member of his family to attend college. He earned a bachelor's degree from the University of British Columbia in 1963, majoring in zoology, and a master's degree from North Carolina State University in 1966, majoring in entomology. He earned a doctorate in biology from Harvard University in 1970, studying under the eminent biologist E.O. Wilson. He earned a law degree from the University of Missouri in 1976, and he completed studies at Harvard University's Institute for Educational Management in 1992.

== Academic career ==
Farish taught at the University of Missouri from 1968 to 1979, becoming chair of the Physiology and Behavior Section of the Division of Biological Sciences. He served as an assistant dean and an associate dean at the University of Rhode Island’s College of Arts and Sciences from 1979 to 1983. He worked at Sonoma State University from 1983 to 1998, rising to Provost and Vice President of Academic Affairs after serving as dean of the School of Natural Sciences.

In 1998, Farish became the sixth president of Rowan University, a public research university in Glassboro, New Jersey. During 13 years at Rowan, he oversaw the physical expansion of the campus, including the construction of new academic facilities for science, medicine, teacher education and technology research; nearly 2,000 additional student residence beds to accommodate rapidly expanding enrollment; and a 26-acre downtown redevelopment project to connect the borough of Glassboro with the university.

In 2011, Farish became the 10th president at Roger Williams University, a forward-thinking private university with campuses on the coast of Bristol, Rhode Island and in the heart of downtown Providence, Rhode Island.

Farish died while still in office on July 5, 2018.

Educational offices
Preceded by Herman James	President of Rowan University; 1998 - 2011	Succeeded by Ali Houshmand; Acting
Preceded by Ronald Champagne	President of Roger Williams University; 2011 - 2018	Succeeded by Andrew A. Workman; Acting
