= Herman James =

Herman James (February 25, 1943 – October 2, 2010) was an American educator who served as the 5th president of Glassboro State College, later Rowan College of New Jersey, and then Rowan University in Glassboro, New Jersey from 1984 to 1998. During his tenure as president, Rowan University received a $100 million gift from Henry Rowan and his wife Betty. At the time, it was the largest ever gift by a private individual to a public university. Following his retirement as university president in 1998, James continued to serve as a professor until 2007. James died in Voorhees, New Jersey on October 2, 2010. In 2012, the Education Hall at Rowan University was named Dr. Herman D James Hall in his honor.

Educational offices
| Preceded by Mark Chamberlain | President of Glassboro State College; 1984 - 1992 | Succeeded by Himself; President of Rowan College of New Jersey |
| Preceded by Himself; President of Glassboro State College | President of Rowan College of New Jersey; 1992 - 1997 | Succeeded by Himself; President of Rowan University |
| Preceded by Himself; President of Rowan College of New Jersey | President of Rowan University; 1997 - 1998 | Succeeded by Donald J. Farish |
