= Runnells Specialized Hospital =

- Center Management Group, LLC

Geography
- Location: Berkeley Heights, New Jersey, New Jersey, United States
- Coordinates: 40.665155°N 74.421772°W

Organization
- Type: Specialist

Services
- Speciality: Psychiatric hospital

History
- Founded: 1912

Links
- Website: www.runnellscenter.com
- Lists: Hospitals in New Jersey

Runnells Specialized Hospital is a hospital in Berkeley Heights, New Jersey. Runnells Specialized Hospital of Union County owns and operates nursing care facilities and hospitals in the state of New Jersey. It is a subsidiary of Center Management Group, LLC. Runnells Center for Rehabilitation and Healthcare-Berkeley Heights has 344 beds and operates in Berkeley Heights.

== History ==
Originally called Bonnie Burn Sanatorium for Tuberculous Diseases, John E. Runnells Hospital in Berkeley Heights, New Jersey came into service in 1912.

The hospital was opened to isolate those suffering with Tuberculosis. Founded by John Runnells, it originally had 64 beds and grew to 300 beds by 1960. When it opened, there was no treatment for TB; however with the discovery of Streptomycin the disease became curable in many cases.

As of 1955, the Runnells Buildings were used for occupational therapy, and there were also facilities for entertainment and recreation. In the 1980s, the John E. Runnells Hospital for Chest Diseases closed. In 1990, the new facility on 45 acres of property adjoining the old location was opened as the Runnells Specialized Hospital.

In 2012, 150 were facing layoffs at the hospital, and 80 layoffs followed. Some of the layoffs were held off as a buyer was sought to privatize certain departments. Afterwards, plans to privatize and sell the hospital met with controversy. It installed a solar panel system in 2013.

In May 2014, Union County approved the sale of the hospital for $26 million to a private management group. It had 300 beds for long-term care, and 44 beds for adult psychiatric care. Center Management Group of Flushing, New York took over the hospital on December 15, 2014. The county that had previously operated the hospital continued to operate a county psychiatric hospital attached to the Runnells building. It was the hospital's first ownership change. 209 of the 391 employees who worked at the hospital for the county were rehired by Center Management or transferred to other county jobs, while 63 employees retired.
