= Bill Lubenow =

American historian (1939–2026)

William Cornelius Lubenow FRHistS (July 28, 1939 – August 19, 2026) was an American academic and professor of History at Stockton University, New Jersey, between 1971 and 2022.

Lubenow served as President of the North American Conference on British Studies, and Chairman of the American Associates Committee of Parliament History. Lubenow was also a member of the Reform Club. His many academic distinctions included: Visiting Fellow of Wolfson College, Cambridge and Fellow of the Royal Historical Society.

Lubenow died on August 19, 2026, at the age of 87.

== Bibliography ==
(selected)

=== Books ===
- Politics of Government Growth: Early Victorian Attitudes Towards State Intervention (David & Charles, Newton Abbot, 1971).
- Parliamentary Politics and the Home Rule Crisis: British House of Commons in 1886 (Clarendon Press, Oxford, 1988).
- The Cambridge Apostles, 1820-1914: Liberalism, Imagination, and Friendship in British Intellectual and Professional Life (Cambridge University Press, Cambridge, 1998)
- Liberal Intellectuals and Public Culture in Modern Britain, 1815-1914: Making Words Flesh (Boydell Press, Suffolk, 2010).
- Only Connect: Learned Societies in Nineteenth-Century Britain (Boydell Press, Suffolk, 2015).
- Learned Lives in England, 1900-1950: Institutions, Ideas and Intellectual Experience (Boydell Press, Suffolk, 2020).
- Secular Foundations of the Liberal State in Victorian Britain (Boydell Press, Suffolk, 2024).

=== Articles ===
- The Organization of Knowledge in Victorian Britain (London and Oxford: Oxford University Press for the British Academy, 2005): 357-370
- Religion in the University: Authority, Faith, and Learning [review essay], Minerva, 42, 3 (September 2004): 269-283
- Authority, Honour, and the Strachey Family (1817-1974), Historical Research, 76, no. 194 (November 2003): 512-534
