= Richard E. Bjork =

American academic administrator

- Born: 1930
- Died: 1984 (aged 53–54)
- Occupation: Academic administrator
- Known for: President of Richard Stockton State College

Richard Emil Bjork (1930–1984) was an American academic administrator who served as vice chancellor of the New Jersey Department of Higher Education from 1968 to 1970, concurrently serving as acting president of Glassboro State College. In 1969, he was selected as the founding president of Stockton State College, where he oversaw the development of the new college, including faculty recruitment, curriculum development, and construction of its campus in Galloway Township, New Jersey. He served as president until 1978, when he became chancellor of the Vermont State Colleges, a position he held until his death in 1984. In 2012, Stockton named its library in his memory.

Educational offices
Preceded by Thomas E. Robinson	Acting President of Glassboro State College; 1968 - 1969	Succeeded by Mark Chamberlain
Preceded by None; Inaugural Holder	President of Stockton State College; 1969 - 1978	Succeeded by Peter M. Mitchell
Preceded by None; Inaugural Holder	Chancellor of the Vermont State College System; 1978 - 1984	Succeeded by Charles I. Bunting
