= Mark Chamberlain (educator) =

American educator

Mark M. Chamberlain (1931–2014) was an American educator and the fourth president of Glassboro State College (now known as Rowan University) from 1969 to 1984.

== Life ==
Chamberlain was born in Pawtucket, Rhode Island and raised in Pittsburgh, Pennsylvania. After graduating from Pittsburgh's South Hills High School in 1949, he received a bachelor's degree in chemistry from Franklin and Marshall College in Lancaster, Pennsylvania, and subsequently attended the University of Illinois where he earned a Doctor of Philosophy (Ph.D.) in inorganic chemistry.

Chamberlain had three sons (David, Mark, and Matthew) with his first wife, Miriam Chamberlain (née Ewing.)

Chamberlain taught chemistry at Western Reserve University, now Case Western Reserve in Cleveland, Ohio for 13 years, also serving as assistant chair of the chemistry department and vice provost for student services. He was appointed as the fourth president of Glassboro State College in 1968 after being selected by the students and faculty of the college. Previous presidents at Glassboro had been appointed by the sitting New Jersey governor. During his tenure as president, Glassboro transitioned from a small teachers college in Southern New Jersey to a multipurpose institution, creating three new academic divisions and expanding the school's enrollment from 3,500 to 8,800 students by 1984. After leaving the college presidency, Chamberlain taught as a chemistry professor until his retirement in 2000.

Chamberlain died on March 29, 2014, at age 82.

Rowan University's student center, completed in 1974, was renamed named in honour of Chamberlain in 2006.

Educational offices
Preceded by Richard E. Bjork; Acting	President of Glassboro State College; 1969 - 1984	Succeeded by Herman James
