= AtlantiCare =

Coordinates: 39.35817°N 74.43471°W

AtlantiCare Regional Medical Center Atlantic City Campus
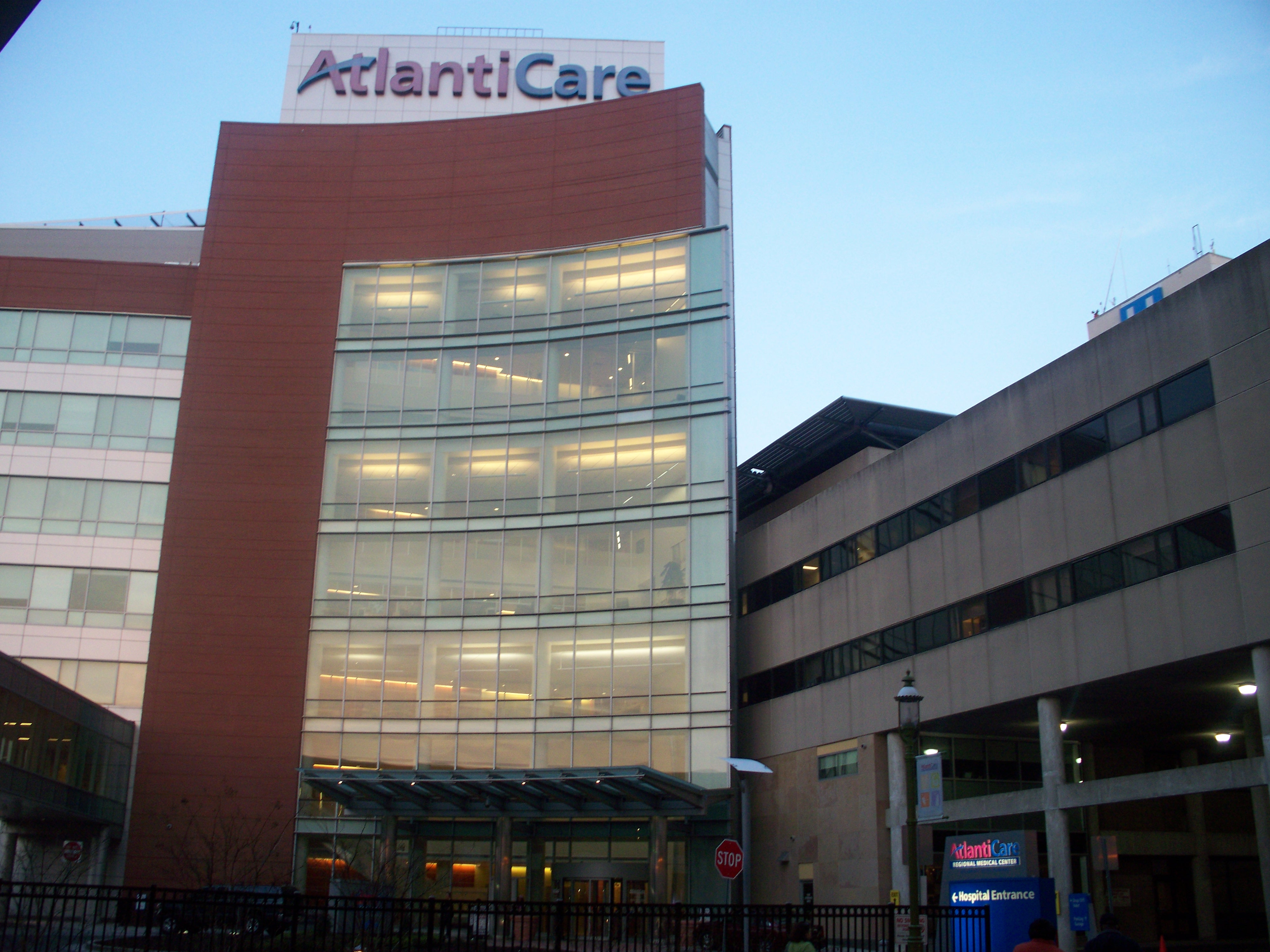
- AtlantiCare Regional Medical Center, Atlantic City, NJ

Geography
- Location: Atlantic County, New Jersey, United States

Services
- Emergency department: Level II trauma center
- Beds: 267

Helipads
- Helipad: FAA LID: 0NJ0

History
- Founded: 1898

Links
- Website: www.atlanticare.org
- Lists: Hospitals in New Jersey

AtlantiCare is a non-profit health system based in Atlantic County, serving southeastern New Jersey. An integrated health system, it operates AtlantiCare Regional Medical Center, a two-campus hospital system with locations in Atlantic City and Galloway Township, as well as a network of primary, specialty, urgent, surgical, and ambulatory services at more than 110 locations across Atlantic, Burlington, Camden, Cape May, and Ocean counties.

The corporate headquarters of the organization is in Egg Harbor Township, New Jersey. The AtlantiCare Foundation is in Atlantic City. Its city campus is in Atlantic City, while its mainland campus is in Galloway Township, near Pomona.

The organization traces its origins to Atlantic City Hospital, which opened in 1898. AtlantiCare was established as an integrated health system in 1993.

== Organization & Expansion ==
AtlantiCare employs more than 6,700 staff members and over 1,660 medical staff across 100 locations.

The AtlantiCare Regional Medical Center consists of two hospitals:

- AtlantiCare Regional Medical Center, Atlantic City Campus in Atlantic City, NJ
- AtlantiCare Regional Medical Center Mainland Division in Pomona, NJ

AtlantiCare traces its origins to November 30, 1898, when Atlantic City Hospital opened in a converted farmhouse at 26 South Ohio Avenue in Atlantic City with 10 beds. The hospital expanded to support the seaside community, opening a nursing school in 1901 and a new 100-bed hospital in 1907. It was renamed Atlantic City Medical Center in 1973, and in 1975 opened its Mainland Campus in Galloway Township. In 1993, the medical center's Board of Governors established AtlantiCare as an integrated healthcare system.

The Mainland Campus, located on West Jimmie Leeds Road, opened in 1975. In 2005, AtlantiCare started a $35 million expansion project that included a new emergency department and the Roger B. Hansen Center for Childbirth. In 2009, the Mainland campus opened a $20 million Cardiac Catheterization & Rhythm Center. Recognizing that it serves as a resource of critical community infrastructure, when AtlantiCare expanded the hospital in 2007, it took protective measures by building Harmony Pavilion to withstand a category 3 hurricane.

In 2009, AtlantiCare received the distinguished Malcolm Baldrige National Quality Award in the healthcare category. Presented by the U.S. Department of Commerce, the Baldrige Award is the nation's highest presidential honor for performance excellence and innovation. AtlantiCare was one of five organizations, and one of two healthcare organizations honored that year. Recipients were evaluated in areas including leadership, strategic planning, customer focus, workforce, process management and organizational results.

In 2014, The Children's Hospital of Philadelphia (CHOP) and AtlantiCare announced a partnership. CHOP Newborn & Pediatric Care at AtlantiCare delivers tertiary pediatric and subspecialist support to southeastern New Jersey. CHOP pediatric hospitalists are at the Stanley M. Grossman Pediatric Center at AtlantiCare Regional Medical Center Atlantic City Campus. CHOP neonatologists are at the Neonatal Intensive Care Unit at the Roger B. Hansen Center for Childbirth at AtlantiCare Regional Medical Center Mainland Campus. CHOP clinicians also consult with emergency teams at both AtlantiCare hospitals.

In 2015, AtlantiCare completed a $62.5 million expansion of the Mainland Campus, which included a new main entrance and updates to the hospital.

In 2021, AtlantiCare broke ground on a new Medical Arts Pavilion on Ohio Avenue in Atlantic City, on the same block where Atlantic City Hospital was founded in 1898. The three-story, 69,700-square-foot facility opened in 2022 at a cost of $38.3 million. The pavilion expanded services including maternal-fetal medicine, family planning, pediatrics and family medicine, while also becoming the home of AtlantiCare's Medical Education Program and a clinical simulation center.

AtlantiCare marked its 125th anniversary in 2023. That year, Michael J. Charlton became president and chief executive officer, initially serving in an interim capacity beginning June 1 before being appointed permanently in October. Charlton had previously served on AtlantiCare's Board of Directors for more than 14 years, including six years as board chair.

In 2024, under Charlton's leadership, AtlantiCare launched Vision 2030, a six-year strategic plan focused on healthcare transformation, community health, workforce development and growth. The strategy has included expansion of hospital and ambulatory facilities, new clinical and academic partnerships, investment in medical education and a systemwide technology transformation.

As part of the strategy, AtlantiCare Cancer Institute became affiliated with Cleveland Clinic Cancer Institute in 2024. The affiliation provides AtlantiCare patients access to Cleveland Clinic specialists, clinical trials, research and advances in cancer treatment. AtlantiCare also established a clinical partnership with Global Neurosciences Institute to expand neurological and neurosurgical services in southern New Jersey.

A major component of Vision 2030 is "AtlantiCare Powered by Oracle," a multi-year technology transformation with Oracle Health. The initiative encompasses clinical and administrative systems and calls for implementation of approximately 20 Oracle solutions and more than 60 capabilities across the organization. The phased program includes electronic health record enhancements, clinical workflows, artificial intelligence-assisted documentation, revenue cycle and patient registration systems, and Oracle Fusion applications supporting human resources, finance and supply chain operations.

AtlantiCare was also an early implementation site for Oracle Health's Clinical AI Agent, which uses generative artificial intelligence to assist clinicians with documentation. Becker's Hospital Review reported in 2024 that, based on an analysis of more than 6,000 patient visits, participating providers reduced documentation time by 42 percent, with an average of 66 minutes saved per provider per day. By December 2025, Becker's reported that AtlantiCare's broader Oracle implementation was approximately halfway complete following its third major systemwide deployment.

Expansion of the Mainland Campus was completed in 2025 of a $75 million project that added two floors to the Meadows Pavilion, including 50 private medical-surgical patient rooms, and included renovation of existing space for an expanded intensive care unit and other hospital services.

AtlantiCare also partnered with Select Medical to develop a new inpatient rehabilitation hospital in Galloway Township and operate outpatient physical therapy services throughout southeastern New Jersey. The joint venture, announced in 2023, included plans for a new rehabilitation hospital to replace the former Bacharach Institute for Rehabilitation. The AtlantiCare Rehab Hospital in partnership with Select Medical celebrated their ribbon cutting in August 2026.

Medical education and workforce development continue to be significant part of AtlantiCare's organizational strategy. In April 2026, Temple University's Lewis Katz School of Medicine and AtlantiCare formalized an agreement to establish a four-year regional medical school campus in Atlantic City. The AtlantiCare Campus is expected to enroll approximately 40 students per class, accommodate third- and fourth-year students completing clinical rotations and welcome its first class in August 2029. It will be the medical school's first regional campus in southern New Jersey.

In May 2026, AtlantiCare and Stockton University announced the creation of the Stockton-AtlantiCare College of Community Health in Atlantic City. The partnership is intended to expand healthcare education and workforce development in the region, including programs in nursing, health sciences, social work and public health, as well as new undergraduate and graduate programs aligned with regional healthcare workforce needs.

== COVID-19 Response ==
During the COVID-19 pandemic, AtlantiCare played a regional role in New Jersey's vaccination effort. In December 2020, the New Jersey Department of Health selected the Atlantic City Convention Center as one of six COVID-19 vaccination megasites established throughout the state. AtlantiCare served as the clinical lead for the Atlantic City Convention Center vaccination megasite, working in partnership with the State of New Jersey, Atlantic County and the New Jersey National Guard. AtlantiCare provided pharmacy, nursing, paramedic, information technology and other clinical and operational resources. Nursing students from Atlantic Cape Community College and Stockton University also participated as vaccinators and in other roles.

The Atlantic City site began vaccinating eligible recipients on January 22, 2021. Initially designed to administer more than 2,000 vaccinations per day, the operation later developed capacity to provide as many as 6,000 doses daily. The site administered its 100,000th dose on March 19 and had administered more than 233,000 doses by late April, serving residents from all 21 New Jersey counties. The Convention Center operation concluded on June 19, 2021. By its closure, the site had administered 272,585 COVID-19 vaccine doses.

== Leadership ==
In 2007, David P. Tilton was named president and CEO, succeeding longtime CEO George Lynn. In 2016, Lori Herndon replaced David Tilton as president and CEO. Upon her retirement, Michael J. Charlton, was appointed to the role of president and CEO in 2023.

== Awards and accreditations ==
- Malcolm Baldrige National Quality Award, 2009
- Magnet hospital status, designated 2004, re-designated 2008
- Residency program accredited by Accreditation Council for Graduate Medical Education
- Residency program accredited by American Osteopathic Association

== Gallery ==
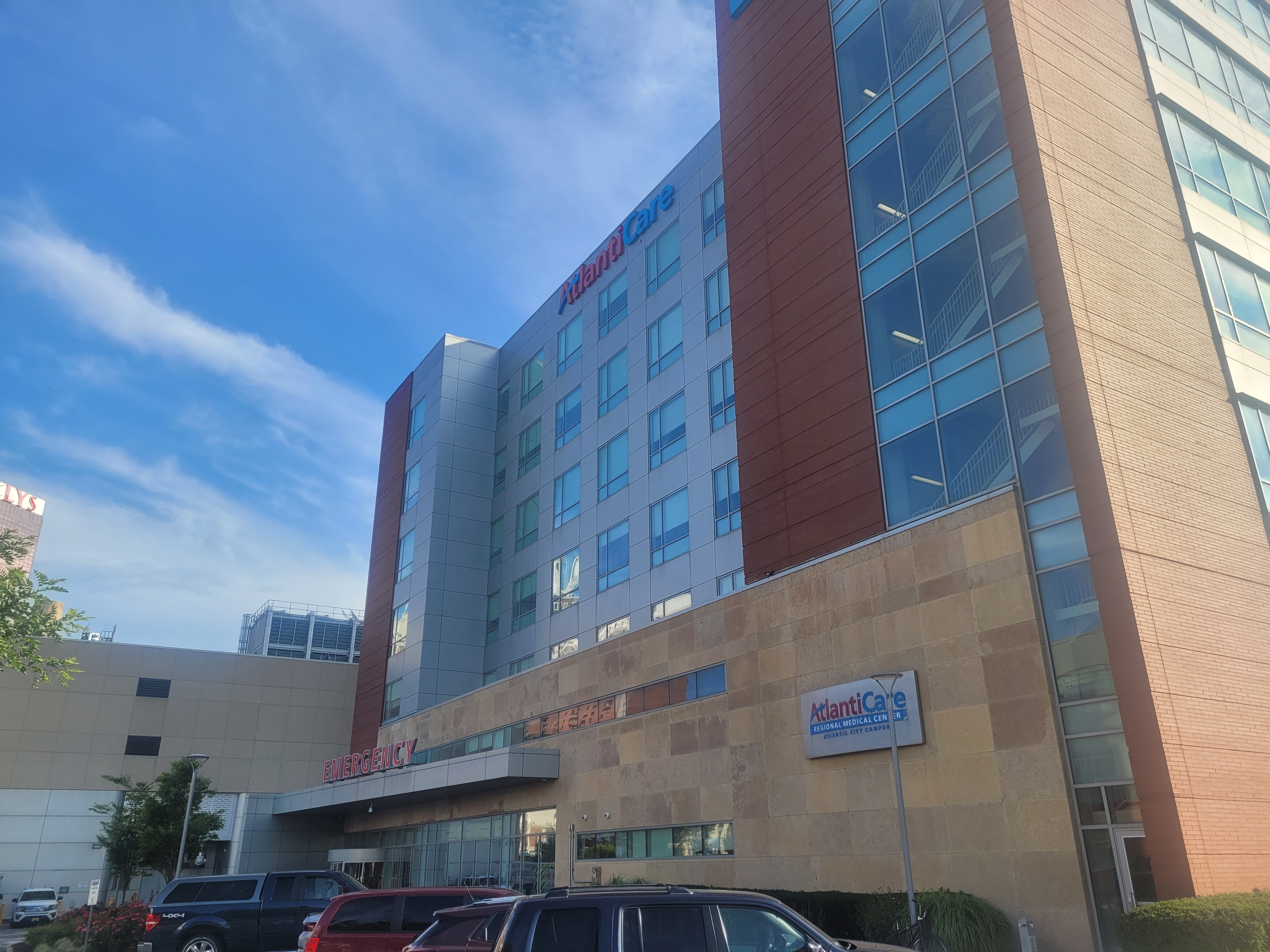
Atlantic City Campus, July 2024

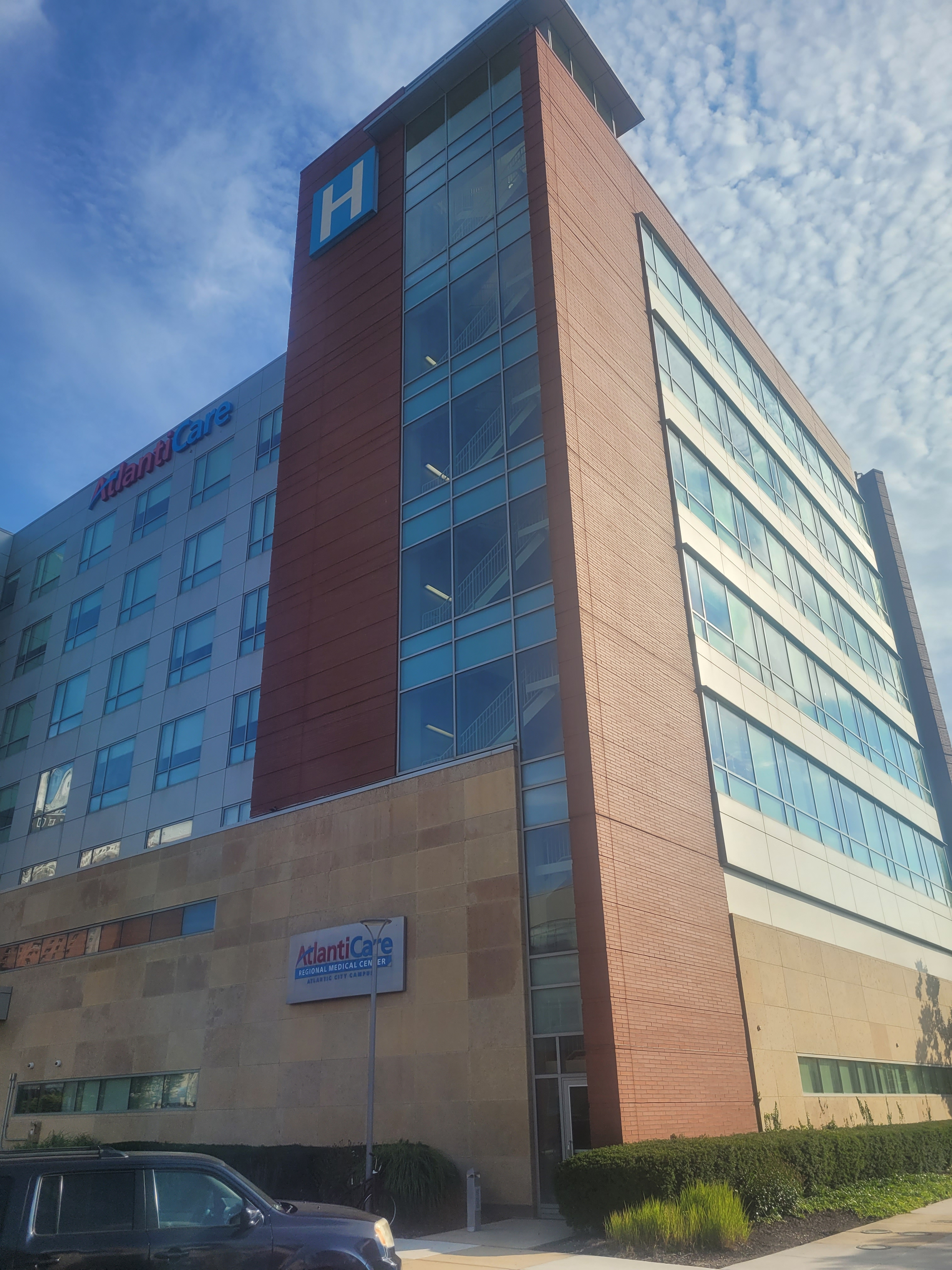
Atlantic City Campus, July 2024

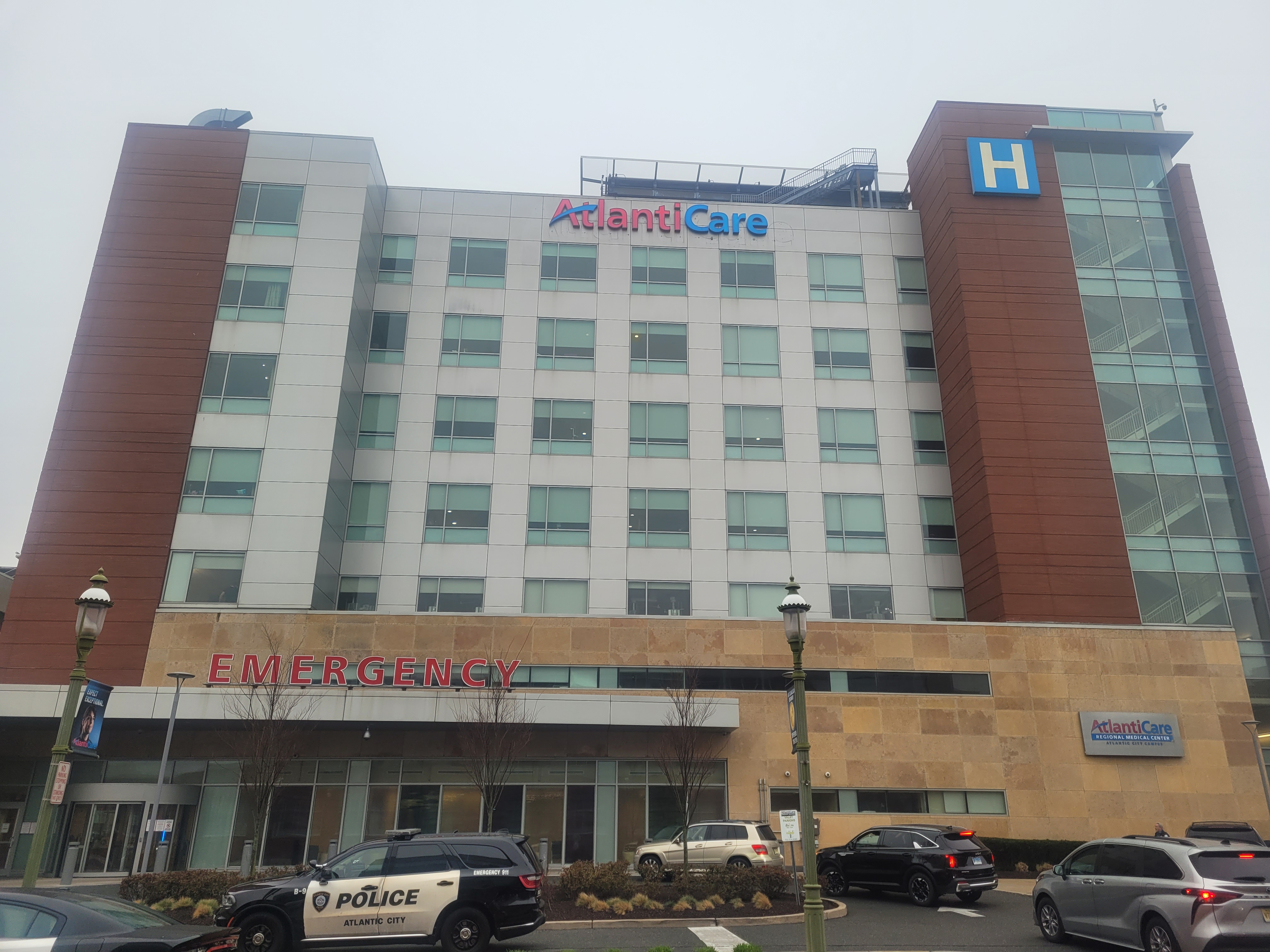
Atlantic City Campus, April 2025

== See also ==
- List of hospitals in New Jersey
