= Ed Kasky =

American football tackle

- Kasky in 1941

No. 73, 19, 52
- Position: Tackle

Personal information
- Born: June 22, 1919; Brooklyn, New York, U.S.
- Died: December 27, 1997 (aged 78); Brigantine, New Jersey, U.S.

Career information
- High school: Glen Cove
- College: Villanova (1938–1941)

Career history
- Philadelphia Eagles (1943); Long Island Indians (1946–1947); Richmond Rebels (1947)

Edward Thomas Kasky (June 22, 1919 – December 27, 1997) was an American professional football tackle. He played for the Philadelphia Eagles of the National Football League (NFL). He also played for the Long Island Indians and the Richmond Rebels of the American Football League (AFL).

== Life and career ==
Kasky was born in Brooklyn, New York. He played high school football at Glen Cove High School, and was captain of the football team in 1937. He then enrolled at Villanova University to play college football for the Villanova Wildcats. He played on the team from 1938 to 1941, and was a three-year varsity letterman.

In 1942, Kasky joined the Philadelphia Eagles of the National Football League (NFL). He started three games for the team, and played in ten games during the 1942 NFL season. In August 1943, he became a free agent, and he served in the United States Marine Corps during World War II. In 1946, he joined the Long Island Indians of the American Football League. He started ten games for the team, and played in ten games during the 1946 AFL season. In July 1947, he rejoined the Indians. He started three games for the team, and played in three games during the 1947 AFL season, and on October 8, 1947, he again became a free agent. On October 22, 1947, he joined the Richmond Rebels. He started one game, and played in seven games. After his football ended, he worked as a adjunct professor at Stockton State College and Atlantic Community College.

== Death ==
Kasky died on December 27, 1997, at his home in Brigantine, New Jersey, at the age of 78.
