= Harvey Kesselman =

5th President Stockton University
- Incumbent
- Assumed office September 23, 2016
- Preceded by: Herman Saatkamp

Personal details
- Born: June 18, 1951 (age 74)
- Spouse: Lynne Kesselman
- Education: Stockton University (BA); Rowan University (MS); Widener University (PhD)
- Website: Office of the President

Harvey Kesselman (born June 18, 1951) is an American academic administrator who served as the fifth president of Stockton University in Galloway Township, New Jersey. He is the first Stockton alumnus to become president and was a member of the first class at Stockton.

== Education ==
Kesselman received a Bachelor of Arts degree in political science from Stockton University, a Master of Science in student personnel services and counseling from Rowan University, and his doctorate in higher education administration from Widener University.

== Career ==
Kesselman was appointed by the American Council on Education (ACE) to serve as a member of the Commission on Internationalization and Global Engagement (CIGE), through June 2019. He serves on the Board of Directors of the World Trade Center of Greater Philadelphia.

=== Stockton University ===
While at Stockton University, Kesselman served in senior leadership roles including as provost and executive vice president, dean of the School of Education, interim vice president for administration and finance, CEO of the Southern Regional Institute (SRI) and Educational Technology Training Center (ETTC), and vice president for student affairs. Kesselman also is a tenured professor in Stockton's School of Education.

He was set to become president of the University of Southern Maine in the summer of 2015 but chose to remain at Stockton at the request of the Board of Trustees, following the resignation of the immediate past president Herman Saatkamp.

Kesselman was inaugurated as the fifth president of Stockton University on September 23, 2016. During his tenure, he oversaw a $33.2 million expansion of Stockton's science facilities and a $15.2 million classroom building. This expansion includes the creation of an Academic Quad that changed the main entrance to the university.

Kesselman also oversaw the expansion of the university's Galloway campus to a campus in Atlantic City, which opened in fall 2018. The campus in Atlantic City houses 533 residential students and includes an Academic Center that will accommodate up to 2,000 students. The campus is part of the Atlantic City Gateway Project, a public-private partnership with Atlantic City Development Corp., or AC Devco, which also includes a parking garage and new headquarters for South Jersey Gas.

In July 2022, Kesselman announced that he would retire as president, effective June 2023.

=== Other roles ===
Kesselman served on the Executive Committee of the Higher Education Student Assistance Authority (HESAA), which oversees New Jersey's $1 billion student financial aid program. Kesselman serves as a reviewer for the Middle States Commission on Higher Education (MSCHE).

Kesselman served on the Governor's Task Force to improve the NJ STARS program; participated on the New Jersey College and Career Readiness Task Force; advised the New Jersey State College and University Presidents' Council regarding accountability and assessment; represented the senior public colleges and universities in the NJ Committee of Experts on Campus Sexual Assault Issues; served as one of six representatives appointed by the Chancellor of Higher Education to author and develop the NJ Student Unit Record Enrollment (SURE) statewide data and monitoring system; founded and chaired the SRI & ETTC Consortium, which includes more than 90 school districts throughout New Jersey; and serves as a reviewer for the Middle States Association Commission on Higher Education. He also serves as the senior public college representative on the New Jersey Higher Education Leadership Team (HELT), which considers policy questions and recommends strategies regarding the implementation of the Partnership for Assessment of Readiness for College and Careers (PARCC).

He served as chair of the New Jersey Presidents’ Council (NJPC) from 2020 to 2022. He served as co-chair of the student success working group for the N.J. State Plan for Higher Education. He also sits on Governor Murphy's Executive Council for Atlantic City Shared Prosperity.

== Personal life ==
Kesselman is married to Lynne Kesselman, who received both her bachelor's degree in Business in 1982, and Master of Arts Degree in Instructional Technology in 2005, from Stockton. She taught at Egg Harbor Township High School for 13 years and was chosen by the U.S. Department of Education to receive the American Star of Teaching Award for New Jersey. Kesselman is Jewish.

In 2009, Kesselman was elected as a Democrat to serve on the Hamilton Township, Atlantic County, New Jersey Township Committee and has served on the Board of Education of the Hamilton Township Schools.
