= Marian Sigman =

American developmental and child psychologist

- Born: June 17, 1941
- Died: April 30, 2012 (aged 70)
- Occupations: Professor Emeritus of Psychiatry and Biobehavioral Sciences and Psychology
- Spouse: David Stephen Sigman
- Awards: INSAR Lifetime Achievement Award (2009)

Academic background
- Education: Boston University (PhD)

Academic work
- Discipline: Psychologist
- Sub-discipline: Developmental psychology
- Institutions: University of California, Los Angeles
- Main interests: Autism spectrum disorder

Marian Diamond Sigman (1941–2012) was a developmental and child clinical psychologist known for her research on autism spectrum disorder (ASD). At the time of her death, she was Professor Emeritus of Psychiatry and Biobehavioral Sciences and Psychology at the University of California, Los Angeles (UCLA).

Sigman co-founded with Daniel Geschwind the UCLA Center for Autism Research and Treatment (CART) and served as its director for much of her career. She was named Outstanding Research Mentor at the Department of Psychiatry of UCLA in 2000 in recognition of her positive impact on the lives and careers of her graduate students.

Sigman was past-president of the International Society for Autism Research (INSAR) and a Charter Fellow of the Society. In 2009, she was honored by INSAR with a Lifetime Achievement Award for her research on joint attention in autism.

Sigman was co-author with Lisa Capps of the 1997 book Children with Autism: A Developmental Perspective. The book emphasized the importance of a developmental perspective for understanding autism, and contrasted behaviors of children with and without autism across different developmental stages.

== Biography ==
Sigman attended graduate school at Boston University where she obtained her PhD in Clinical Psychology. As a graduate student, she was supported by a fellowship from the Radcliffe Institute, which was the first of its kind to assist women with children who were attending school. After graduating, Sigman moved with her two children, Hillary and Daniel, and husband, David Stephen Sigman to Los Angeles. David Sigman was hired as faculty member in Biological Chemistry at UCLA and Marian Sigman secured a postdoctoral research position. Sigman became a member of the faculty in Psychiatry and Biobehavioral Sciences in 1977 and remained at UCLA until her retirement in 2009.

Over her career, Sigman obtained more than 30 million dollars in grant monies including prestigious program project and center grants from the National Institutes of Health Collaborative Program of Excellence in Autism (CPEA; 1997-2007) and Studies to Advance Autism Research and Treatment (STAART; 2003-2008).

== Research ==
Sigman's research focused on biological and environmental contributors to social communicative deficits and skills in autism. One of her inspirations for this field of study was her cousin Stella Chess, a renowned child psychiatrist whose epidemiological research helped establish autism as a neurological disorder. With her colleagues at CART, Sigman advanced efforts to discover the neural and genetic markers of autism as well as the behavioral markers for autism risk in infancy. One of Sigman's innovative research designs involved the longitudinal study of infant siblings of children with autism. Infants siblings are at heightened risk for developing autism and therefore provide clues to its earliest signs. Today there are infant sibling studies of autism being conducted around the world.

Sigman created one of the first well-articulated developmental programs of autism research that uncovered characteristics now considered to be core deficits of autism, including difficulties in social orienting, social communication, and joint attention. One of her best known studies compared the sensorimotor skills and play behaviors of autistic children with children who had intellectual disability. The study, one of several conducted in collaboration with Judy Ungerer, aimed to identify deficits specific to autism. The researchers observed autistic children to be impaired in their imitation of gestures and vocalizations and to show less diverse functional and symbolic play.

Another important line of research focused on autistic children's social interactions with their caregivers as well as with unfamiliar adults. This work, in collaboration Peter C. Mundy, Connie Kasari and others, contrasted social responsiveness and communicative behaviors of children with autism, children with intellectual disability, and neurotypical children. Their findings indicated that children with autism do in fact initiate social interactions with both familiar and unfamiliar people, but have deficits in communicative and pragmatic skills.

== Representative publications ==
- Sigman, M. D., Kasari, C., Kwon, J. H., & Yirmiya, N. (1992). Responses to the negative emotions of others by autistic, mentally retarded, and normal children. Child Development, 63(4), 796-807.
- Sigman, M., Mundy, P., Sherman, T., & Ungerer, J. (1986). Social interactions of autistic, mentally retarded and normal children and their caregivers. Journal of Child Psychology and Psychiatry, 27(5), 647-656.
- Sigman, M., Ruskin, E., Arbelle, S., Corona, R., Dissanayake, C., Espinosa, M., ... & Robinson, B. F. (1999). Continuity and change in the social competence of children with autism, Down syndrome, and developmental delays. Monographs of the Society for Research in Child Development, 64(1), Serial number 256, i-139.
- Sigman, M., & Ungerer, J. A. (1984). Cognitive and language skills in autistic, mentally retarded, and normal children. Developmental Psychology, 20(2), 293-302.
- Whaley, S. E., Pinto, A., & Sigman, M. (1999). Characterizing interactions between anxious mothers and their children. Journal of Consulting and Clinical Psychology, 67(6), 826-836.
