= Herman Saatkamp =

Herman J. Saatkamp Jr.

President of Stockton University
- In office June 2003 – April 2015
- Preceded by: Vera King Farris
- Succeeded by: Harvey Kesselman

Personal details
- Born: September 29, 1942 (age 84) Knoxville, TN
- Spouse: Dorothy Saatkamp
- Education: Carson–Newman College; Southern Theological Seminary; Vanderbilt University
- Profession: President of Stockton University, tenured professor of Philosophy
- Website: Office of the President

Herman Saatkamp was the fourth president of Stockton University (formerly Stockton College) in Galloway Township, New Jersey. He succeeded Vera King Farris in June 2003. Prior to his appointment at Stockton, Saatkamp fulfilled numerous roles at other universities. On April 22, 2015, Saatkamp submitted his resignation as president, to be effective by August 31. However, on April 28, he initiated a medical leave of absence, citing "past and present health considerations". His departure occurred amidst controversy surrounding Stockton's purchase of the shuttered Showboat casino, which Saatkamp intended to repurpose as an "island campus" of Stockton.

Saatkamp is an authority on philosopher George Santayana.

== Early life and career ==
Saatkamp received his B.A. from Carson-Newman College, his M.Div. from Southern Theological Seminary, and his M.A. and Ph.D. from Vanderbilt University. Prior to his presidency at Stockton, he was the dean of the School of Liberal Arts at Indiana University-Purdue University Indianapolis, the head of the Department of Humanities in Medicine at the College of Medicine at Texas A&M University, and the head of the Department of Philosophy and Humanities at the College of Liberal Arts at Texas A&M University.

== Stockton ==
Stockton has been ranked in the top tier of the Best Regional Colleges and Universities of the North by U.S. News & World Report in its annual "America's Best Colleges" for the last seven years (as of September 2014). It has also been ranked by U.S. News & World Report in its Top 15 Schools in the North. Stockton ranked in the fourth tier when Saatkamp became president in 2003 and in the third tier in 2005. The Princeton Review also named Stockton one of the "Best in the Northeast" in August 2014.

Saatkamp's achievements at Stockton include the building and opening of the Unified Science Center in September 2013, the completion of the Stockton Campus Center in May 2011, and the acquisition of Seaview, a golf club and hotel that offers additional student housing and has benefitted the school's Hospitality and Tourism Management Studies Program. The Stockton Foundation's assets have grown from $2.4 million to nearly $29 million (as of April 2015) under Saatkamp's leadership.

== Santayana scholarship ==
A scholar on philosopher George Santayana, Saatkamp is senior and founding editor of the Santayana Edition. The Santayana Edition produces The Works of George Santayana, a critical edition of Santayana's published and unpublished writings. Saatkamp was the general editor and director of the Santayana Edition for over twenty-five years. He was also the co-founder and co-editor of Overheard in Seville: The Bulletin of the Santayana Society. In May 1992, Saatkamp organized the first International Conference on George Santayana in Avila, Spain, and delivered a paper titled "Santayana: The Popular Stranger." He also delivered a major address to the International Congress for George Santayana in Italy in 2012. Saatkamp's works on Santayana include five volumes (in twelve books) of The Works of George Santayana, which he co-edited as the general editor of the Santayana Edition.

== Personal life ==
Saatkamp is married to Dorothy Saatkamp, who worked in special education, focusing on learning disabilities. The couple has two children, three granddaughters and one grandson. In 2015, Saatkamp's son Joseph married former child actress Lauren King who played Kathy in the first 3 seasons of the popular children's television series, Barney & Friends.

== List of selected works ==
- Burch, Robert W., and Herman J. Saatkamp, Jr. Frontiers in American Philosophy, Volume I. College Station, TX: Texas A&M University Press, 1992.
- Burch, Robert W., and Herman J. Saatkamp, Jr. Frontiers in American Philosophy, Volume II. College Station, TX: Texas A&M University Press, 1996.
- Jones, John and Herman J. Saatkamp, Jr. George Santayana: A Bibliographic Checklist, 1880-1980. Bowling Green, OH: Philosophy Documentation Center, 1982.
- Saatkamp Jr., Herman J. "Animal Faith." Southern Journal of Philosophy: Special Issue on Santayana (Summer 1972): 167-171.
- Saatkamp Jr., Herman J. "‘Festive Celebration of Life as One of Santayana's Prime Values. A Comment on M. Grossman's Presentation of Santayana's Ultimate'." Ultimate Reality and Meaning 16 (1993): 134–37.
- Saatkamp Jr., Herman J. "‘Final Intentions, Social Context, and Santayana's Autobiography'." In Text: Transactions of the Society for Textual Scholarship, edited by D.C. Greetham and W. Speed Hill, 93–108. New York: AMS Press, 1988.
- Saatkamp Jr., Herman J. "Genetics and Pragmatism." In Pragmatic Bioethics, edited by Glenn McGee, 163-179. Cambridge, Massachusetts: MIT Press, 2003.
- Saatkamp Jr., Herman J. "George Santayana." In Stanford Encyclopedia of Philosophy, edited by Ed Zalta. Stanford University, 2001. http://plato.stanford.edu/entries/santayana/
- Saatkamp Jr., Herman J. "‘George Santayana, 1863−1952'." In The Blackwell Guide to American Philosophy, edited by Armen T. Marsoobian and John Ryder, 135–54. Malden, MA: Blackwell Publishing Ltd., 2004.
- Saatkamp Jr., Herman J. "George Santayana: Ciudadano del Mundo." Translated by Daniel Moreno Moreno. Revista de Occidente, no. 346 (2010): 5–29.
- Saatkamp Jr., Herman J. Introduction to The Birth of Reason and Other Essays by George Santayana, edited by Daniel Cory, xiii-xxxii. New York: Columbia University Press, 1995.
- Saatkamp Jr., Herman J., ed. Rorty and Pragmatism: the Philosopher Responds to His Critics. Nashville: Vanderbilt University Press, 1995.
- Saatkamp Jr., Herman J. "‘Santayana: Hispanic-American Philosopher'." Transactions of the Charles S. Peirce Society: A Quarterly Journal in American Philosophy 34 (Winter 1998): 51–68.
- Santayana, George. The Letters of George Santayana: Book One, [1868]-1909. Edited by William G. Holzberger and Herman J. Saatkamp Jr. Vol. 5. 20 vols. Santayana Edition. The Works of George Santayana. Cambridge, Massachusetts: MIT Press, 2001.
- Santayana, George. The Letters of George Santayana: Book Two, 1910-1920. Edited by William G. Holzberger and Herman J. Saatkamp Jr. Vol. 5. 20 vols. Santayana Edition. The Works of George Santayana. Cambridge, Massachusetts: MIT Press, 2002.
- Santayana, George. The Letters of George Santayana: Book Three, 1921-1927. Edited by William G. Holzberger and Herman J. Saatkamp Jr. Vol. 5. 20 vols. Santayana Edition. The Works of George Santayana. Cambridge, Massachusetts: MIT Press, 2002.
- Santayana, George. The Letters of George Santayana: Book Four, 1928-1932. Edited by William G. Holzberger and Herman J. Saatkamp Jr. Vol. 5. 20 vols. Santayana Edition. The Works of George Santayana. Cambridge, Massachusetts: MIT Press, 2003.
- Santayana, George. The Letters of George Santayana: Book Five, 1933-1936. Edited by William G. Holzberger and Herman J. Saatkamp Jr. Vol. 5. 20 vols. Santayana Edition. The Works of George Santayana. Cambridge, Massachusetts: MIT Press, 2003.
- Santayana, George. The Letters of George Santayana: Book Six, 1937-1940. Edited by William G. Holzberger, Herman J. Saatkamp Jr., and Marianne Wokeck. Vol. 5. 20 vols. Santayana Edition. Cambridge, Massachusetts: MIT Press, 2004.
- Santayana, George. The Letters of George Santayana: Book Seven, 1941-1947. Edited by William G. Holzberger, Herman J. Saatkamp Jr., and Marianne Wokeck. Vol. 5. 20 vols. Santayana Edition. Cambridge, Massachusetts: MIT Press, 2006.
- Santayana, George. The Letters of George Santayana: Book Eight, 1948-1952. Edited by William G. Holzberger, Herman J. Saatkamp Jr., and Marianne Wokeck. Vol. 5. 20 vols. Santayana Edition. Cambridge, Massachusetts: MIT Press, 2008.
- Santayana, George. The Sense of Beauty: Being the Outlines of Aesthetic Theory. Edited by William G. Holzberger and Herman J. Saatkamp Jr. Vol. 2. Santayana Edition. Cambridge, Massachusetts: MIT Press, 1988.
- Santayana, George, William G. Holzberger, Herman J. Saatkamp Jr., and Richard C. Lyon. The Works of George Santayana: Persons and Places: Fragments of Autobiography. Vol. 1. 20 vols. Santayana Edition. Cambridge, Massachusetts: MIT Press, 1987.
- Santayana, George, and Richard C. Lyon. Persons and Places: Fragments of Autobiography. Edited by William G. Holzberger and Herman J. Saatkamp Jr. Vol. 1. 20 vols. Cambridge, Massachusetts: The MIT press, 1986.
- Santayana, George, and Joel Porte. The Works of George Santayana: Interpretations of Poetry and Religion. Edited by William G. Holzberger and Herman J. Saatkamp Jr. Vol. 3. 20 vols. Santayana Edition. Cambridge, Mass.: MIT Press, 1990.
- Santayana, George, and Irving Singer. The Works of George Santayana: The Last Puritan: A Memoir in the Form of a Novel. Edited by Herman J. Saatkamp Jr. and William G. Holzberger. Vol. 4. 20 vols. Santayana Edition. The Works of George Santayana. Cambridge, Massachusetts: MIT Press, 1994.
