= Connie Kasari =

American autism researcher

- Occupations: Professor of Professor of Psychological Studies in Education and Psychiatry

Academic background
- Education: University of North Carolina, Chapel Hill Peabody College Oregon State University

Connie Kasari is an expert on autism spectrum disorder and a founding member of the Center for Autism Research and Treatment (CART) at the University of California, Los Angeles (UCLA). Kasari is Professor of Psychological Studies in Education at UCLA and Professor of Psychiatry at the David Geffen School of Medicine at UCLA. She is the leader of the Autism Intervention Research Network for Behavioral Health, a nine-institution research consortium.

Kasari received the Harold A. and Lois Haytin Award in 2017 in recognition of her community partnered participatory research in South Los Angeles and at the UCLA Lab School. Kasari's work with various organizations in South Los Angeles has focused on increasing awareness and knowledge about autism; her work at the UCLA Lab School aims to improve instructional methods for "complex learners" who benefit from curricular modifications.

== Biography ==
Kasari completed a Bachelor of Science degree at Oregon State University. After completing a Masters of Arts at Peabody College, she went on to obtain a PhD in psychiatry at the University of North Carolina at Chapel Hill in 1985. Her dissertation titled Mother-handicapped infant interactions: A comparison of caregiver and infant characteristics and other early research, conducted in collaboration with John Filler, focused on young children with severe disabilities that impacted their motor functioning and interactions with caregivers.

Kasari was an NIMH postdoctoral fellow at the Neuropsychiatric Institute at UCLA prior to joining UCLA faculty in 1990. As a post doctoral fellow, she began a long-standing collaborative program of research with Marian Sigman, Peter C. Mundy, and Nurit Yirmiya, focusing on social interaction, joint attention, and affect expression in children with autism, Down syndrome, and other development disabilities.

Kasari has served as the Principal Investigator of several Autism Center of Excellence Grants from the National Institutes of Health awarded to UCLA. The grants have supported multi-site randomized controlled trials to support communicative development in minimally verbal autistic children.

== Research ==
Kasari's research focuses on targeted interventions for early social communication development in at-risk infants, toddlers, and preschoolers with autism, and peer relationships for school-aged children with autism. Kasari has led several randomized controlled trials of therapeutic interventions for children with autism. Her team developed Joint Attention Symbolic Play Engagement and Regulation (JASPER) therapy as an evidence-based treatment for autistic children. JASPER aims to improve joint engagement, social communication, and emotion regulation, and decrease child negativity, while improving parental co-regulation strategies. More recent work tested a parental responsiveness intervention for toddlers at high risk for autism using a randomized control design. This study aimed to determine the effectiveness of a parent-mediated intervention to increase parental responsiveness and the impact of the intervention on the children's cognitive and language skills. Although the intervention was effective in increasing parental responsiveness to their children, it did not lead to improvements in the children's joint attention and communication skills after one year, relative to the control group.

== Representative Publications ==
- Kasari, C., Freeman, S. F., & Paparella, T. (2006). Joint attention and symbolic play in young children with autism: A randomized controlled intervention study. Journal of Child Psychology and Psychiatry, 47, 611–620.
- Kasari, C., & Lawton, K. (2010). New directions in behavioral treatment of autism spectrum disorders. Current Opinion in Neurology, 23(2), 137–143.
- Kasari, C., Paparella, T., Freeman, S. F., & Jahromi, L. B. (2008). Language outcome in autism: Randomized comparison of joint attention and play interventions. Journal of Consulting and Clinical Psychology, 76, 125–137.
- Kasari, C., Sigman, M., Mundy, P., & Yirmiya, N. (1988). Caregiver interactions with autistic children. Journal of Abnormal Child Psychology, 16, 45–56.
- Kasari, C., Sigman, M., Mundy, P., & Yirmiya, N. (1990). Affective sharing in the context of attention interaction of normal, autistic, and mentally retarded children. Journal of Autism and Developmental Disorders, 20, 87–100.
