= Stockton University =

Public university in Galloway Township, New Jersey, US

- Former names: Stockton State College (1968–1993); Richard Stockton College of New Jersey (1993–2015)
- Type: Public university
- Established: 1969; 57 years ago
- Accreditation: MSCHE
- Academic affiliations: Sea-grant, Space-grant
- President: Joe Bertolino
- Faculty: 342 full-time (fall 2023)
- Undergraduates: 7,583 (fall 2025)
- Postgraduates: 1,043 (fall 2025)
- Location: Galloway, New Jersey, U.S.
- Campus: 1,600 acres (650 ha); Suburban
- Colors: Black, white, & Columbia blue
- Nickname: Ospreys
- Sporting affiliations: NCAA Division III-NJAC
- Mascot: Talon the Osprey
- Website: stockton.edu
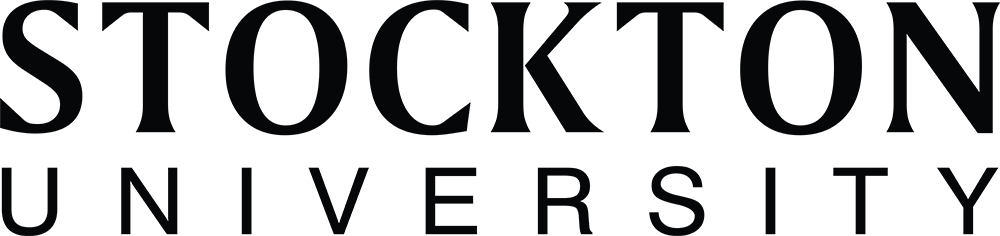

Stockton University is a public university in Galloway Township, New Jersey, United States. It is a part of New Jersey's public system of higher education. It is named after Richard Stockton, one of the New Jersey signers of the U.S. Declaration of Independence. Founded in 1969, Stockton enrolled its first class in 1971. Stockton is accredited by the Middle States Commission on Higher Education. The university has a second campus located in Atlantic City.

== History ==
In November 1968, New Jersey approved a $202.5 million (equivalent to $1874.82 million in 2025) capital construction bond issue with an earmarked $15 million (equivalent to $138.88 million in 2025) designated for the construction of a new state college in Southern New Jersey. In 1969, a 1,600-acre (650-hectare) tract was selected for the campus in the heart of the New Jersey Pine Barrens in Galloway Township. The school's trustees narrowed down final name options as either "Southern Jersey State College", "South Jersey State College", "Atlantic State College", and "Jersey Shore State College" before settling on "South Jersey State College." However, the school quickly sought another name, due to confusion between the new College and Rutgers College of South Jersey. The trustees considered naming the college after one of New Jersey's five Signatories of the Declaration of Independence; Richard Stockton, John Witherspoon, Francis Hopkinson, John Hart, and Abraham Clark, before settling on Stockton. The reason why Stockton was chosen was never disclosed, nor properly recorded, with the school launching an investigation as to why in 2017.

In 1970, as construction began to run behind schedule, the trustees realized they needed an alternative location for the first class in 1971. They selected the historic Mayflower Hotel in Atlantic City as the temporary campus. Accreditation of Stockton State College by the Middle States Association of Colleges and Schools was first granted in December 1975.

In 1993, the college's name was changed to the Richard Stockton College of New Jersey. After the New Jersey Secretary of Higher Education approved Stockton's petition, the college was awarded university status and was officially renamed Stockton University on February 18, 2015.

Shortly after the toppling of the Robert E. Lee Monument in Charlottesville, Virginia, and the deadly aftermath of the Unite the Right rally, the school dismantled a bust of Richard Stockton on campus on August 25, 2017, partly due to Stockton's ownership of slaves, and partly because of a widespread flyer-spreading incident in favor of Unite the Right on campus at the same time. University leaders then announced they would make a special "contextual history exhibit" as the bust's new home with the school vowing to have an honest investigation into the prospect of a name change. Ultimately this was never done, and the bust was simply returned to its previous location by 2023. The university's president also announced that the university had already looked into changing its name for its 40th anniversary in 2009, but ultimately decided against it but that they were willing to have an "honest discussion" about a new name for its 50th anniversary in 2019.

In June 2020, the board of trustees passed a resolution on "Commitment to Diversity, Equity, Inclusion, and Social Justice at Stockton" asking the president to create a committee to discuss changing the name. The president declined to create such a committee but the Faculty Senate created a 30-person task force to do just that and look into more practical issues of a name change such as the university's built up cultural identity, reception, and cost. The task force found that the student and faculty bodies were evenly split on the issue, as Stockton also suffered the "contentious accusation of being a traitor" due to the way he was released from British Custody during the American Revolution by Swearing an Oath to King George III vowing to forego politics during the war and resigning from Congress. In their final report, the task force found that Stockton University had no legal means of changing its name, and urged for the creation of such bylaws and for the President to at least consider a name change. On April 7, 2023, university president Harvey Kesselman went on an interview with WPGG, unequivocally stating that there would be no name change and Stockton was the only signer imprisoned and starved by the British. Ultimately, the school never did find why Stockton's name was chosen from among the New Jersey signatories.

Following a complaint from John F. Scarpa, a cable and cellular phone executive who donated millions of dollars to the college, in 2026 Stockton removed a statement from Professor Raz Segal about "Israel’s ongoing genocide in Gaza" from the webpage of the Stockton master’s program in Holocaust and Genocide Studies.

In the fall of 2017, Stockton University began constructing a new facility in the Chelsea neighborhood of Atlantic City. The addition was met with applause from local residents and community leaders, who hailed it as a redevelopment of the long-declining neighborhoods in Ward 5 of Atlantic City. The $220-million-campus opened in September 2018 and included a three-story academic center and apartment-style complex for student living called Kesselman Hall.

Stockton announced in May 2026 it was partnering with AtlantiCare to establish the Stockton-AtlantiCare College of Community Health in Atlantic City. This initiative is planned to expand healthcare education, career pathways and community health in South Jersey. AtlantiCare committed an initial amount of $15 million to Stockton to support the development of academic programming and other efforts related to the alliance. The College of Community Health will allow Stockton to expand its existing programs in nursing, health sciences and public health to meet demand, and create new undergraduate and graduate programs.

Like many colleges and universities in the United States in the period, Stockton was beset by financial difficulties in the 2020s, and began running an annual deficit. There has been a general decline in college enrollment as well as the size of the college-age cohort, and the second Trump administration took measures that reduced the number of international students, who are a valuable revenue source. Additionally, Stockton has complained that the State of New Jersey has not honored promises and financial inducements made to encourage the building of the Atlantic City campus. As of October 2026, Stockton is exploring laying off up to 22 faculty and staff positions in an attempt to tighten its finances. The autumn 2026 enrolment figure stood at 8,101, marking a decline of around 10.8% since 2022.

=== Presidents ===
- Richard E. Bjork
- Peter M. Mitchell
- Vera King Farris
- Herman Saatkamp
- Harvey Kesselman
- Joe Bertolino

== Academics ==
Stockton University's academic programmes are devided into seven schools, covering the following fields: arts and humanities, business, education, general studies, health sciences, natural sciences and mathematics, and social and behavioural sciences. Both bachelor's and master's degrees are offered, as well as doctorates in nursing and physical therapy.

In 2024, the university added a new a Bachelor of Science programme to it's portfolio. The Hemp and Cannabis Business Management degree was developed from the cannabis studies minor, which was initially established in 2018. It combines business education with cannabis-specific subjects, such as cultivation and social justice.

== Campus ==
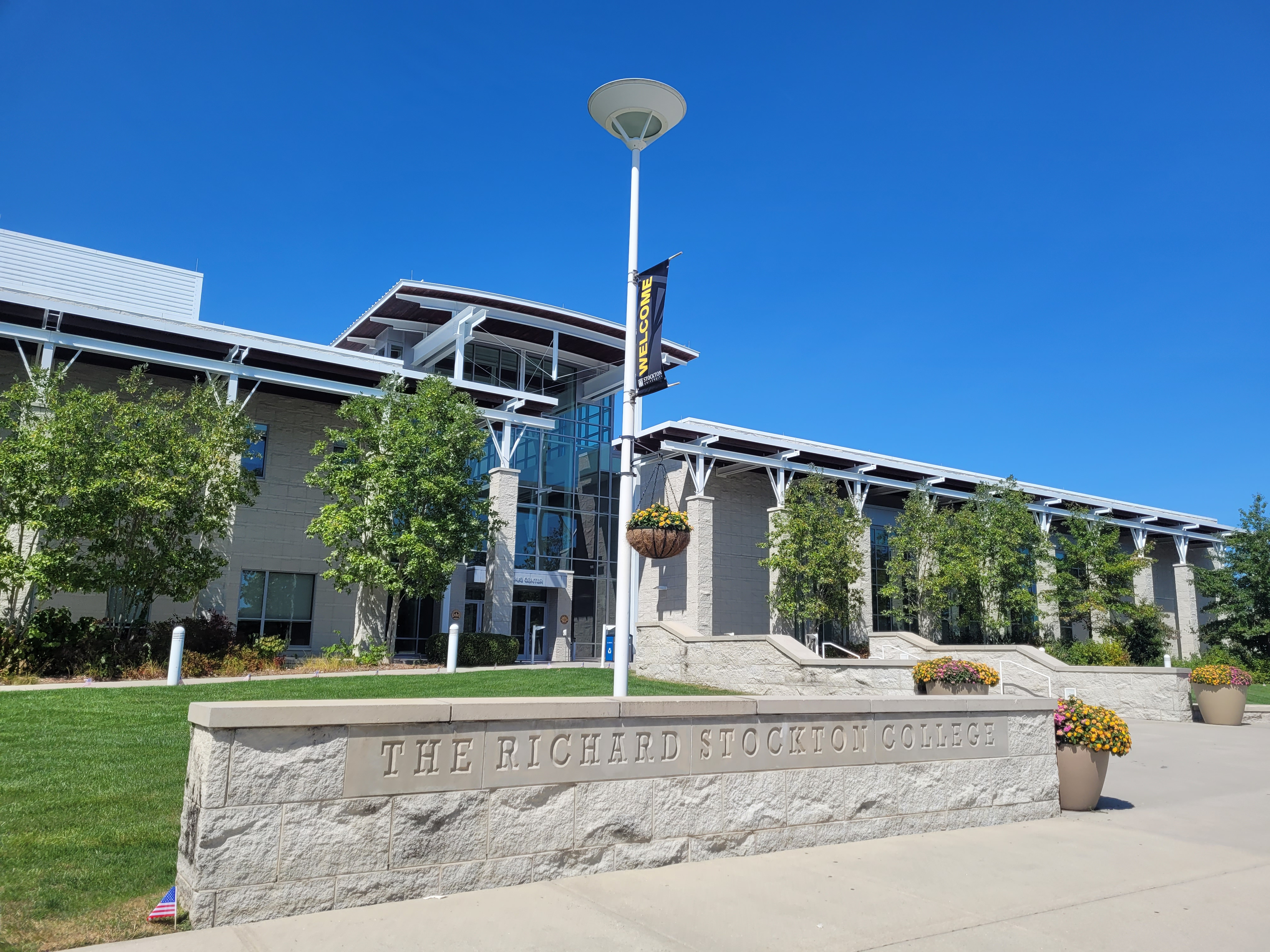
Stockton University Campus Center, September 2024

In the 2010s, the university completed several major building projects and other initiatives. The new Campus Center opened its doors with a ribbon-cutting ceremony on May 7, 2011. The 154,000-square-foot (14,300-square-metre) building was designed as a green, sustainable building which would be an inviting, inclusive, and exciting gathering place for the entire community.

Stockton opened a new $39.5-million Unified Science Center with state-of-the-art equipment in September 2013. The 66,350-square-foot (6,164-square-metre), three-story facility expands Stockton's School of Natural Sciences and Mathematics (NAMS).

After undergoing a $24 million renovation, the Richard E. Bjork Library and Learning Commons reopened in September 2026. The project involved expanding the library's study facilities and introducing spaces equipped for digital media production. Several academic spaces were also centralised, with the writing, mathematics and chemistry centres, as well as a tutoring centre, being relocated within the library.

=== Seaview Resort ===
In September 2010, as part of its expansion of its tourism and hotel management program in the School of Business, Stockton purchased the nearby Seaview Resort & Golf Course for $20 million. In 2010, Stockton established the Lloyd D. Levenson Institute of Gaming, Hospitality and Tourism (LIGHT), part of the Stockton School of Business in Atlantic City at Stockton's Carnegie Center. The institute conducts research into the gaming and hospitality industries in New Jersey's Government. It produces economic analyses and publications on topics such as casino revenues, tourism and regional competition. Furthermore, the institude also plans conferences and public discussions on issues affecting these sectors.

Stockton University officially completed the sale of the Stockton Seaview Hotel & Golf Club on July 31, 2018, to KDG Capital LLC of Florida for $21,070,000.

=== Atlantic City campus ===
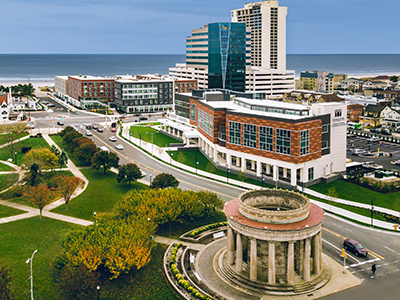
The Stockton Atlantic City campus opened in fall 2018

The university has built an Atlantic City campus at the Boardwalk and Albany Ave, with student residences overlooking the beach and Boardwalk. Stockton University Atlantic City opened fall 2018 with more than 500 residential students and more than 1,800 students taking courses in the new Academic Center, built on the former site of Atlantic City High School. The project is a public-private partnership with Atlantic City Development Corp., or AC Devco, a non-profit modeled on New Brunswick Development Corp, which expanded Rutgers' New Brunswick campus. The project includes a parking garage topped by new offices for South Jersey Gas, with 879 parking spaces for use by the university, South Jersey Gas and the public; and an academic building that can accommodate up to 1,800 students. The university also owns and operates the nearby Rothenberg Building.

Funding sources for the Atlantic City campus include $50.4 million in bonds from the Atlantic County Improvement Authority from proceeds of almost $70 million in tax credits issued by the New Jersey Economic Development Authority.

In 2023, Stockton opened Parkview Hall, a second Atlantic City residential complex for students. The 133,055-square-foot residential complex combines six stories of student housing and amenities, including 107 apartments capable of housing 416 students.

In December 2014, Stockton had purchased the shuttered Showboat Atlantic City hotel and casino for $18 million, with plans to develop a full-service residential campus awarding undergraduate and graduate degrees and other professional training programs. The former resort, dubbed the "Island Campus", would have been converted casino and employee spaces into classrooms, cafeteria space and offices for faculty and staff. Several floors of hotel rooms would be renovated into student housing, while the remaining rooms would be operated as a hotel. The House of Blues would be modified to house the school's performing arts programs.

Soon after, it was publicly disclosed that Trump Entertainment Resorts held a covenant to the property, preventing the site from being used as anything other than a casino. It was through this covenant that Trump Entertainment Resorts prevented Stockton's plans to open an Atlantic City campus on the Showboat property. President Saatkamp came under fire for making the purchase despite knowing about the covenant. The university reached a deal to lease the property from investor Glenn Straub, who planned to purchase the Showboat. Straub later sued the university to prevent Stockton from backing out of the deal. Stockton sold the Showboat property to Bart Blatstein in January 2016.

== Student life ==
Undergraduate demographics as of Fall 2025
Race and ethnicity	Total
White	55%
Hispanic	21%
Black	11%
Asian	7%
Two or more races	4%
International student	1%
Unknown	1%
Economic diversity
Low-income (Note: The percentage of students who received an income-based federal Pell grant intended for low-income students.)	48%
Affluent (Note: The percentage of students who are a part of the American middle class at the bare minimum.)	51%

Stockton's Division of Student Affairs is organized to provide comprehensive programs and services to more than 8,800 students, including more than 3,000 students who reside in university facilities. These programs and services are intended to enhance campus life and enrich the academic programs of Stockton.

Stockton University is home to more than 200 official student clubs and organizations including a Student Senate. The Office of Student Development oversees all student clubs and organizations.

There are student media organizations, including the Argo, a student-produced newspaper. WLFR 91.7 (Lake Fred Radio) is the student-run FM radio station licensed to Stockton in 1984. Stockpot Literary Magazine is an annual literary publication featuring art, poetry and writing of Stockton students and alumni. The Stockton yearbook (The Path) is an historical record of the academic year.

== Housing ==
Stockton has six housing units on campus. Housing II and III are complexes of traditional three-story residence halls, while Housing I, IV and V are all apartment-style complexes of varying architectural character.

- Founder's Hall (Housing II and III): Housing II is an 11-building, suite-style complex, housing around 520 students, with 17 residents per floor and 51 per three-story building. Housing III is a five-building complex, housing approximately 300 students with 20 students per floor and 60 per building. The residential halls offer a more traditional university lifestyle for the first-year experience. Originally, all students who choose to live on campus in their first year were required to live in either Housing II or Housing III; however, due to exceptionally large freshmen classes in recent years, some freshmen are assigned to Housing 1 as well.
- The Apartments (Housing I, IV, and V) consist of three multi-building complexes. Housing I is a 255-unit, 1,012-bed, garden apartment complex, which allows four students to live in proximity while being part of a larger court community of 128.
- Housing IV consists of eight buildings, each with eight two-bedroom apartments, with a total 246 beds. Each apartment holds four residents. Every four apartments are separated by an indoor foyer that leads out to the Housing IV recreational university green.
- Housing V, completed in 2008 as part of the capital program, consists of a complex of six buildings with a total of 384 beds. The Housing V suites house four students, with four key-entry bedrooms. These students share a kitchen and living area with their roommates and have access to a larger community recreation room.
- In fall 2018 Stockton opened its Atlantic City Campus. The Atlantic City Campus Residential Complex can accommodate some 530 students. The room styles are one-person studio, two-person private, four-person shared and private, and six-person private; all are apartment style living, with full kitchens. The number of rooms was increased for the 2020–2021 school year to comply with regulations relating to the COVID-19 pandemic in New Jersey.

== Ranking and special recognition ==
In 2025, Stockton was ranked No. 84 by U.S. News & World Report among public colleges and universities in the nation and No. 158 on the Best National Universities list. Stockton was also recognized as one of the top 40 national universities for social mobility, which is based on enrolling and graduating low-income students.

=== Architecture ===
- The original linear campus was cited as one of New Jersey's ten "architectural treasures" by New Jersey Monthly (April 1999) for its International modernist style, designed in the late 1960s by Robert Geddes of Geddes Brecher Qualls Cunningham Architects. Generous use of glass opens views to the Pinelands setting. The noted architect Michael Graves designed the Arts and Sciences Building (1991–1996) in a Post-Modernist style, with organic colors.
- After the F-Wing renovation in 2006, Stockton received LEED certification from the U.S. Green Building Council.
- In 2008, Stockton received the "Green Project of Distinction" award from Education Design Showcase for Housing V (six residence halls).
- The Campus Center was awarded LEED Gold certification established by the U.S. Green Building Council. Leadership in Energy and Environmental Design (LEED) is the nation's preeminent program for the design, construction and operation of high performance green buildings.
- The Unified Science Center, a 66,350-square-foot facility that opened in 2013, includes energy-efficient features and three striking artworks tied to the building's environmental and scientific purpose: a Water Molecule sculpture by artist Larry Kirkland; The Wave, a hanging colored-glass installation by artist Ray King; and Sun Sails, a second colored-glass installation by King.
- Ground was broken in 2014 for a 54,000-square-foot expansion, The Unified Science Center 2 and a Health Sciences Center, which opened in 2018.

=== Green initiatives ===
Stockton is an environmentally friendly campus featuring a geothermal heat pump, fuel cells, and photovoltaic panels. In 2002, Stockton installed a 200 kW fuel cell, which provides just under 10% of the total energy for the campus; Stockton has the lowest energy cost per student among universities in New Jersey. Stockton achieved national LEED certification for its new sustainable design.

Stockton's commitment to environmentally responsible design has resulted in "green" initiatives that have both saved energy and decreased greenhouse gas emissions. These include the development on campus of one of the largest geothermal heating and cooling systems in the world. The geothermal systems incorporate seasonal thermal energy storage so that waste heat or winter cold can be collected when seasonally available and stored for use in the opposing seasons. A borehole thermal energy storage system (BTES) was installed in 1994 and is used for heating the older half of campus, with waste heat collected from air conditioning equipment there. In 1995 a fuel cell and photovoltaic panels were installed buildings to generate energy.

An aquifer thermal energy storage system (ATES), the first of its kind in the United States, began operation in 2008. The ATES system reduces the amount of energy used to cool Stockton's newer buildings by storing the chill of winter air in the water and rock of an underground aquifer, and withdrawing it in the summer for cooling. In 2008, Stockton approved an agreement with Marina Energy LLC for the installation of solar panels on The Big Blue athletic center roof to generate electricity.

As part of the capital plan, Housing V was built in 2009 to accommodate the rising demand for student housing. It incorporates geothermal heating and cooling using closed-loop technology, for a total of 450 tons cooling capacity. To eliminate the possibility of groundwater contamination in the event of a leak, freeze protection is provided in the circulating fluid. The design accommodates future solar thermal heating systems. Sustainable design includes landscaping: upper-story deciduous trees were planted along the south-facing facades of the residence halls to provide shade during the summer months, but allow the warmth of the sun to reach the buildings during the winter. This design received the "Green Project of Distinction" award from Education Design Showcase.

Stockton's next green project was the largest single building project in its history. Designed and built according to the U.S. Green Building Council's LEED Gold Standard in sustainable design, the new Campus Center, completed in 2011, provides 153,000 square feet (14,200 m^{2}) of space for dining, bookstore, pool, theater, lounges and offices. It will use 25% less energy than standard construction, and 40% less water. Other features include low-emitting adhesives, sealants, paints and coatings. Additional "green" features of the building include a storm water-collection system to irrigate an on-site "rain garden" landscaped with indigenous and adapted plant species. It also has a sophisticated energy management system for heating, cooling, ventilation and lighting.

In 2013, Stockton received approval from the New Jersey Pinelands Commission to administer the state's first comprehensive forest management plan on public land. Stockton actively manages more than 1,500 acres of forest on its campus, benefiting the local wildlife populations, protecting the campus against fire and pathogens and providing recreation such as hiking and wildlife viewing.

== Athletics ==
Stockton Ospreys wordmark

Stockton athletics teams are nicknamed the Ospreys.

- Intercollegiate Sports Include: Men's and Women's Cross Country, Field Hockey, Men's and Women's Soccer, Women's Tennis, Women's Volleyball, Men's and Women's Basketball, Men's and Women's Indoor Track & Field, Baseball, Men's and Women's Lacrosse, Women's Rowing, Softball, Women's Golf, and Men's and Women's Outdoor Track & Field.
- The team is part of the NJAC in the majority of sports. In men's lacrosse they compete in the Coastal Lacrosse Conference.
- Intramural Sports Include: Flag Football, Indoor Soccer, Volleyball, Dodgeball, Basketball, Street Hockey, and Softball.
- Club sports include: Bowling, Ice Hockey, Jiu Jitsu, Judo, Table Tennis, Fishing, Men's Rowing, Ultimate Frisbee, Fencing, Men's Volleyball, Co-Ed Weight Training, Quidditch, Golf, Scuba Diving, Co-Ed Tennis, and Esports.
- Stockton also offers a cheerleading squad open to both male and female students. The squad traditionally performs at all home men's and women's basketball games.

=== Honors ===
- Paul Lewis was the NCAA Division III 400-Meter Dash Champion in 1981
- 2001, NCAA Division III Men's Soccer Champions. Coach Jeff Haines was named NCAA Division III "Coach of the Year."
- 2003, Stockton student Kim Marino was NCAA Division III Indoor and Outdoor Track and Field Women's Pole Vault Champion and record holder.
- Nine NCAA individual national champions in track & field
- Men's basketball coach Gerry Matthews is the winningest college basketball coach in New Jersey history. Matthews retired from Stockton University before the start of the 2016–2017 season. The basketball court was named "Gerry Matthews Court" in his honor.
- Two Olympic medalists held the position of athletic director at Stockton: Don Bragg (1960 pole vault gold) and G. Larry James (1968 4x400 relay gold and 400-meters silver).
- Paul Klemic was the NCAA Division III Men's Long Jump Champion in 2005 and 2006.
- Tiffany Masuhr was the NCAA Division III Women's Javelin Champion in 2005.
- Men's Basketball advanced to the NCAA Final Four in 1987 and 2009.
- Women's Soccer advanced to and hosted the NCAA Final Four in 1995.
- Men's Soccer advanced to the NCAA Final Four in 1999 and the Elite Eight in 2004.
- Jared Lewis was the NCAA Division III Triple Jump Champion in 2017 and 2018.

== Arts ==
The Stockton Performing Arts Center offers musical and theater performances for the community, serves as a venue for student productions and performances through the School of Arts and Humanities, and hosts other campus events.

Stockton has had a campus Art Gallery since 1973. Initially located in a classroom-sized space and relocated in 1979 to a former dance studio, the Art Gallery opened in a dedicated exhibition space in January 2012. The Art Gallery exhibits the work of graduating art majors every year in addition to art by local, regional, and nationally known artists.

In 2010, Stockton College entered a partnership with the South Jersey fine arts center Noyes Museum wherein Stockton would supply funds for needed repairs, and Noyes would provide access to their collections to Stockton. The partnership grew, and eventually the Noyes Foundation which ran the museum entirely ceded its assets and control of the museum to Stockton from 2016–2017. The original Absecon site was sold and the museum currently has exhibits at Stockton's Kramer Hall in Hammonton, as well as the Noyes Arts Garage in Atlantic City.

== Census-designated place ==
Stockton University CDP
- Census-designated place
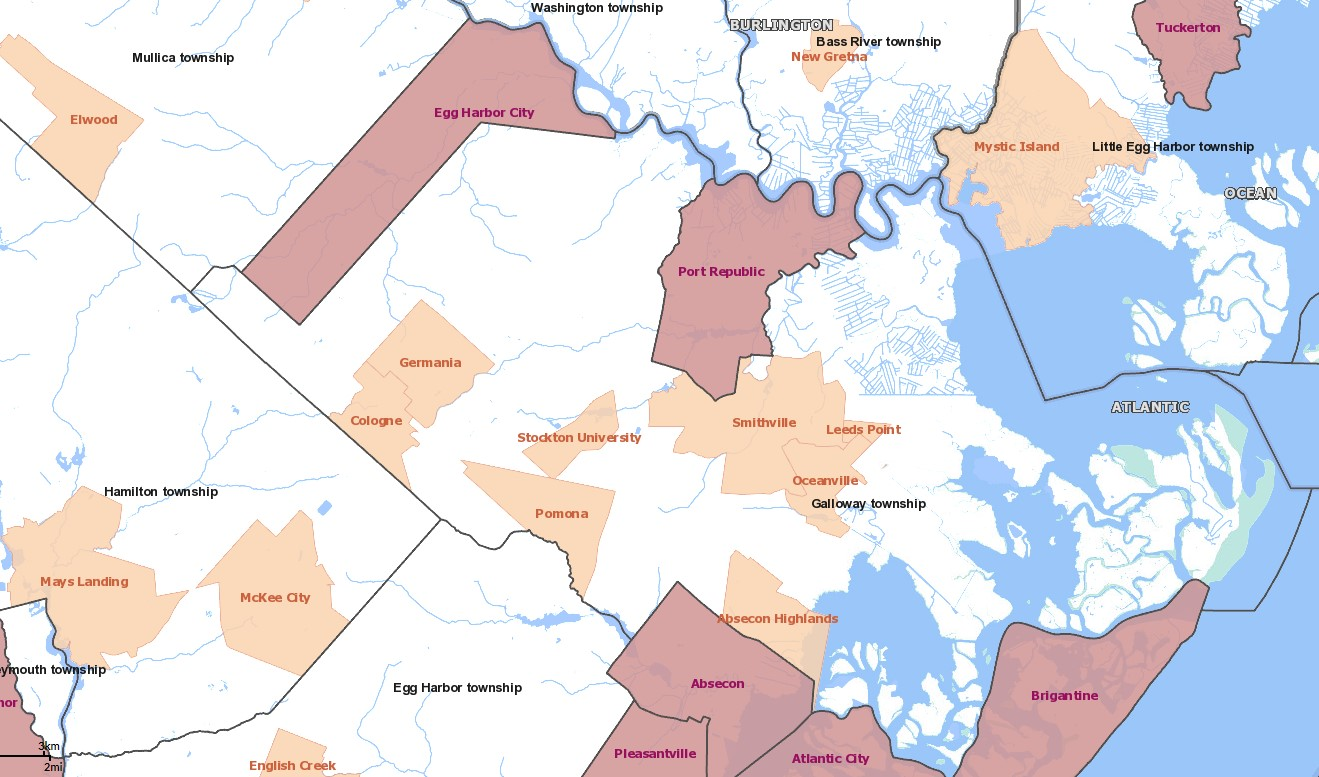

- Location in Atlantic County Location in New Jersey Location in the United States
- Coordinates: +39.4888723°N 74.5416539°W
- Country: United States
- State: New Jersey
- County: Atlantic

Area
  - Total: 1.18 sq mi (3.05 km^{2})
  - Land: 1.10 sq mi (2.85 km^{2})
  - Water: 0.077 sq mi (0.20 km^{2})
- Elevation: 43 ft (13 m)

Population (2020)
  - Total: 2,428
  - Density: 2,205/sq mi (851.2/km^{2})
- Time zone: UTC−05:00 (Eastern (EST))
  - Summer (DST): UTC−04:00 (Eastern (EDT))
- FIPS code: 34-70984
- GNIS feature ID: 2806191

Stockton University CDP is a census-designated place (CDP) covering the residential population of the Stockton University campus in Atlantic County, New Jersey United States.

It first appeared as a census designated place in the 2020 U.S. census with a population of 2,428.

=== Demographics ===
Historical population
Census	Pop.	Note	%±
2020	2,428		—
U.S. Decennial Census; 2020

==== 2020 census ====
Stockton University CDP, New Jersey – Racial and ethnic composition Note: the US Census treats Hispanic/Latino as an ethnic category. This table excludes Latinos from the racial categories and assigns them to a separate category. Hispanics/Latinos may be of any race.
Race / Ethnicity (NH = Non-Hispanic)	Pop 2020	% 2020
White alone (NH)	1,627	67.01%
Black or African American alone (NH)	264	10.87%
Native American or Alaska Native alone (NH)	8	0.03%
Asian alone (NH)	104	4.28%
Native Hawaiian or Pacific Islander alone (NH)	0	0.00%
Other race alone (NH)	0	0.00%
Mixed race or Multiracial (NH)	78	3.21%
Hispanic or Latino (any race)	347	14.29%
Total	2,428	100.00%

== Notable people ==
=== Faculty and staff ===
- Stephen Dunn, Distinguished Professor Emeritus of Creative Writing, received the 2001 Pulitzer Prize for Poetry for his collection of poems, Different Hours.
- University President Vera King Farris spoke at the Stockholm International Forum on the Holocaust in 1999, hosted by the Prime Minister of Sweden and attended by 44 national heads of state.
- Larry James (1947–2008), gold medalist at the 1968 Summer Olympics, was athletic director at Stockton for 28 years. In 2007, Stockton's track and soccer facility was named "G. Larry James Stadium" in his honor.
- Ed Kasky, NFL player
- Bill Lubenow, a Fellow of the Royal Historical Society, author and historian, serves as president of the North American Conference on British Studies. Among his many published works are: The Cambridge Apostles, 1820–1914: Liberalism, Imagination, and Friendship in British Intellectual and Professional Life. Cambridge University Press, 1998
- Carol Rittner, Sisters of Mercy RSM, a Distinguished Professor of Holocaust & Genocide Studies, and considered one of the 50 greatest scholars on the Holocaust. She co-produced the Academy Award-nominated film The Courage to Care based on her book of the same name, and has authored or edited over 15 books. Dr. Rittner spoke at the United Nations twice in 2014, on issues involving genocide in Rwanda and the Holocaust.
- David Lester, a Distinguished Professor of Psychology, is one of the world's leading suicidologists. He is a scholar and author adept in many academic disciplines, with over 2,300 publications worldwide.

=== Alumni ===
- Aimee Belgard, lawyer, politician, and judge
- Christopher J. Connors, member of the New Jersey Senate
- Bob Crawford, musician and author
- Sean Curran, 28th director of the United States Secret Service
- Matthew Pratt Guterl, historian and author
- Laurel Hester, police officer whose story was documented in Freeheld (2007), the winner of the Academy Award for Best Short Documentary and the feature film of the same name (2015)
- Harvey Kesselman, fifth president of Stockton University
- Bruce Larkin, children's book author
- Katrina Law, actress(class of 1999)
- Tim Lenahan, college soccer coach
- Marcus Major, author
- Peter Clive Mundy, developmental psychologist
- Santiago Solari, professional soccer player
- Elissa Tenny, President Emerita of the School of the Art Institute of Chicago and Interim President of Bennington College
