= Pomona, New Jersey =

Populated place in Atlantic County, New Jersey, US

- Census-designated place
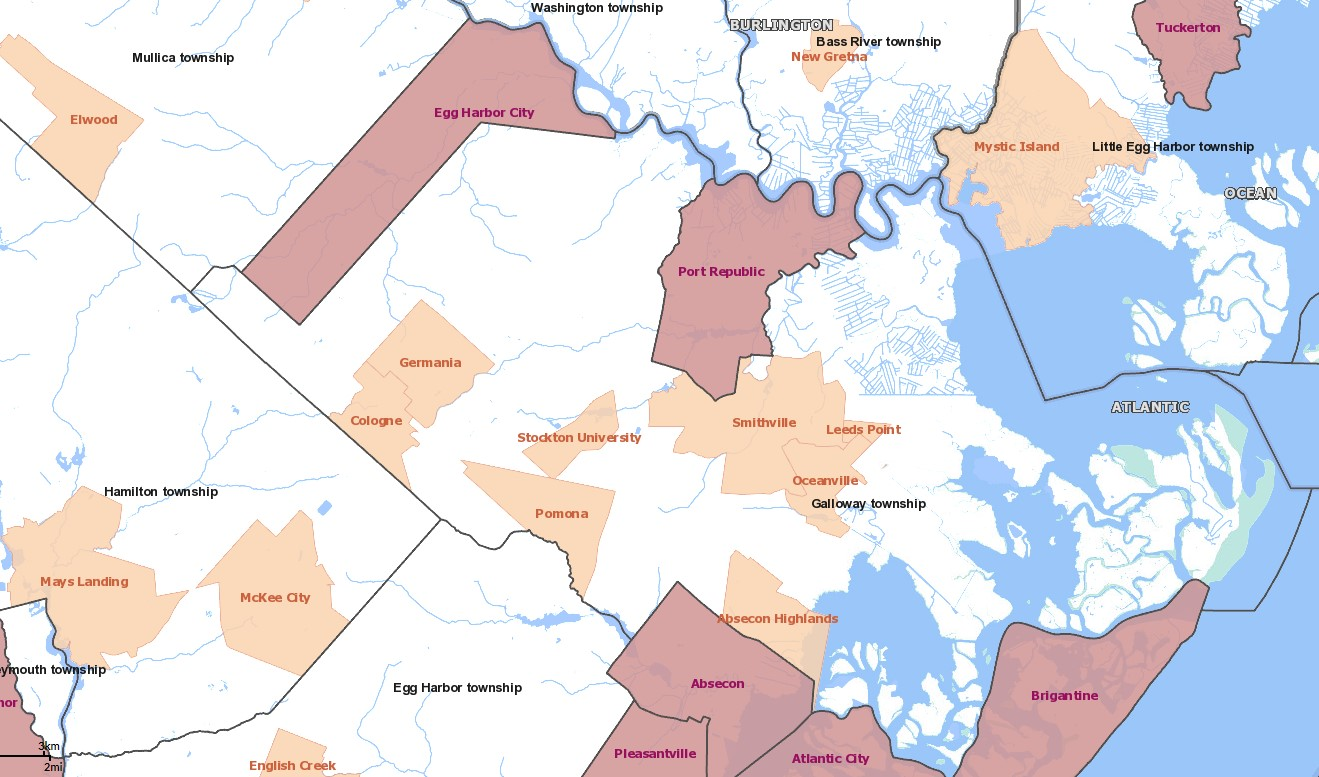
- Neighboring communities

- Left: Map highlighting Pomona within Atlantic County: Right: location of Atlantic County in New Jersey.

- Location in Atlantic County Location in New Jersey Location in the United States
- Coordinates: 39.468722°N 74.550112°W
- Country: United States
- State: New Jersey
- County: Atlantic
- Township: Galloway

Area
  - Total: 2.78 sq mi (7.21 km^{2})
  - Land: 2.78 sq mi (7.21 km^{2})
  - Water: 0 sq mi (0.00 km^{2}) 0.00%
- Elevation: 56 ft (17 m)

Population (2020)
  - Total: 7,416
  - Density: 2,662.8/sq mi (1,028.1/km^{2})
- Time zone: UTC−05:00 (Eastern (EST))
  - Summer (DST): UTC−04:00 (EDT)
- ZIP Code: 08240
- Area code: 609
- FIPS code: 34-60030
- GNIS feature ID: 02389693

Pomona is an unincorporated community and census-designated place (CDP) located within Galloway Township, in Atlantic County, in the U.S. state of New Jersey. As of the 2020 census, Pomona had a population of 7,416. The area is served as United States Postal Service ZIP Code 08240.

Locally, the name "Pomona" is loosely used also to refer to areas adjacent to Pomona proper, including adjoining portions of Hamilton Township and Egg Harbor Township in the vicinity of the Atlantic City International Airport.

Pomona was often described as the home to Stockton University, since the mailing address for the college was a post-office box located in the Pomona Post Office. In 2011, the university changed its mailing address to its main campus (using the street Vera King Farris Drive, Galloway Township, New Jersey).

== Geography ==
According to the U.S. Census Bureau, the Pomona CDP had a total area of 2.797 square miles (7.24 km^{2}), all of which was land.

== Demographics ==
Historical population
Census	Pop.	Note	%±
1980	2,358		—
1990	2,624		11.3%
2000	4,019		53.2%
2010	7,124		77.3%
2020	7,416		4.1%
Population sources 1950 1960 1970; 1980 1990 2000; 2010 2020

Pomona first appeared as a census designated place in the 1980 U.S. census.

=== Racial and ethnic composition ===
Pomona CDP, New Jersey – Racial and ethnic composition Note: the US Census treats Hispanic/Latino as an ethnic category. This table excludes Latinos from the racial categories and assigns them to a separate category. Hispanics/Latinos may be of any race.
Race / Ethnicity (NH = Non-Hispanic)	Pop 2000	Pop 2010	Pop 2020	% 2000	% 2010	% 2020
White alone (NH)	2,842	3,672	3,287	70.71%	51.54%	44.32%
Black or African American alone (NH)	319	708	858	7.94%	9.94%	11.57%
Native American or Alaska Native alone (NH)	9	26	3	0.22%	0.36%	0.04%
Asian alone (NH)	480	1,569	1,783	11.94%	22.02%	24.04%
Native Hawaiian or Pacific Islander alone (NH)	1	0	1	0.02%	0.00%	0.01%
Other race alone (NH)	7	35	50	0.17%	0.49%	0.67%
Mixed race or Multiracial (NH)	60	172	245	1.49%	2.41%	3.30%
Hispanic or Latino (any race)	301	942	1,189	7.49%	13.22%	16.03%
Total	4,019	7,124	7,416	100.00%	100.00%	100.00%

=== 2020 census ===
As of the 2020 census, Pomona had a population of 7,416. The median age was 41.0 years. 22.7% of residents were under the age of 18 and 16.8% were 65 years of age or older. For every 100 females there were 91.9 males, and for every 100 females age 18 and over there were 89.4 males age 18 and over.

100.0% of residents lived in urban areas, while 0.0% lived in rural areas.

There were 2,257 households in Pomona, of which 39.5% had children under the age of 18 living in them. Of all households, 55.1% were married-couple households, 14.3% were households with a male householder and no spouse or partner present, and 23.7% were households with a female householder and no spouse or partner present. About 19.1% of all households were made up of individuals, and 9.5% had someone living alone who was 65 years of age or older.

There were 2,415 housing units, of which 6.5% were vacant. The homeowner vacancy rate was 1.6% and the rental vacancy rate was 17.7%.

Pomona has substantial South Asian, Italian, Egyptian, Albanian, Irish, and African communities. Approximately 31.5% of residents are foreign-born.

=== 2010 census ===
The 2010 United States census counted 7,124 people, 2,107 households, and 1,601 families in the CDP. The population density was 2,547.0 people per square mile (983.4 people/km^{2}). There were 2,202 housing units at an average density of 787.3 units per square mile (304.0 units/km^{2}). The racial makeup was 57.99% (4,131) White, 10.64% (758) Black or African American, 0.44% (31) Native American, 22.11% (1,575) Asian, 0.00% (0) Pacific Islander, 5.22% (372) from other races, and 3.61% (257) from two or more races. Hispanic or Latino of any race were 13.22% (942) of the population.

Of the 2,107 households, 43.4% had children under the age of 18; 58.4% were married couples living together; 12.0% had a female householder with no husband present and 24.0% were non-families. Of all households, 19.7% were made up of individuals and 12.2% had someone living alone who was 65 years of age or older. The average household size was 3.19 and the average family size was 3.68.

26.6% of the population were under the age of 18, 8.9% from 18 to 24, 25.7% from 25 to 44, 24.5% from 45 to 64, and 14.3% who were 65 years of age or older. The median age was 37.4 years. For every 100 females, the population had 86.6 males. For every 100 females ages 18 and older there were 82.3 males.

=== 2000 Census ===
At the 2000 census, there were 4,019 people, 1,297 households and 1,002 families living in the CDP. The population density was 554.2 people/km^{2} (1,435 people/mi^{2}). There were 1,357 housing units at an average density of 187.1 units/km^{2} (485 units/mi^{2}). The racial makeup of the CDP was 74.15% White, 8.04% African American, 0.35% Native American, 11.99% Asian, 0.02% Pacific Islander, 3.56% from other races, and 1.89% from two or more races. Hispanic or Latino of any race were 7.49% of the population.

There were 1,297 households, of which 45.7% had children under the age of 18 living with them, 61.0% were married couples living together, 10.9% had a female householder with no husband present, and 22.7% were non-families. 18.0% of all households were made up of individuals, and 8.8% had someone living alone who was 65 years of age or older. The average household size was 3.05 and the average family size was 3.47.

30.4% of the population were under the age of 18, 7.3% from 18 to 24, 34.9% from 25 to 44, 18.9% from 45 to 64, and 8.5% who were 65 years of age or older. The median age was 34 years. For every 100 females, there were 95.4 males. For every 100 females age 18 and over, there were 88.4 males.

The median household income was $52,796, and the median family income was $56,846. Males had a median income of $35,554 versus $29,453 for females. The per capita income for the CDP was $18,182. About 2.3% of families and 4.6% of the population were below the poverty line, including 3.3% of those under age 18 and 15.9% of those age 65 or over.

== Education ==
Galloway Township Public Schools operates schools for grades K-8 while the Greater Egg Harbor Regional High School District operates area high schools.

Galloway Township residents, including those of Pomona, are zoned to Absegami High School.

Assumption Regional Catholic School, under the Roman Catholic Diocese of Camden, was previously in Pomona, but in September 2007 moved to another campus elsewhere in the township.

== Notable people ==
- Anne Grunow (born c. 1959), senior research scientist at Ohio State University in the Byrd Polar Research Center.
- Samuel Ojserkis (born 1990), rower who competed in the men's eight event at the 2016 Summer Olympics.
