= Dallas Derby Devils =

Roller derby league

- Metro area: Dallas, Texas
- Country: United States
- Founded: November 2004
- Teams: Army of Darkness (A team); Battalion of Doom (B team); Death Row Rumblers; High Seas Hotties; The Slaughterers; Suicide Shifters; Wrecking Crew; Rolling Rebellion (Juniors); Hellraisers (Open Gender)
- Track type(s): Flat
- Venue: NYTEX Sports Centre
- Affiliations: WFTDA; JRDA; USARS
- Org. type: 501(c)3 Domestic Non-Profit
- Website: derbydevils.com

The Dallas Derby Devils (DDD) is a flat track roller derby league in Dallas, Texas and surrounding area of Ft. Worth, Texas. Founded in November 2004, the Dallas Derby Devils is the original North Texas roller derby league with a current roster of over one hundred active skaters, making DDD one of the largest flat track derby leagues in the southern United States. The Dallas Derby Devils are an original member of the Women's Flat Track Derby Association (WFTDA).

The Dallas Derby Devils have completed sell-out home seasons since 2006 featuring the five home teams that comprise the league; The Death Row Rumblers, The High Seas Hotties, The Slaughterers, The Suicide Shifters, and The Wrecking Crew. Skaters of these five teams make up an All-Star Travel Team for the Dallas Derby Devils called the Army of Darkness, that compete in interleague play against other WFTDA member leagues.

Since 2008, league games are held at the NYTEX Sports Centre in North Richland Hills, Texas.

The Dallas Derby Devils is a skater-owned and skater-operated 501(c)3 Domestic Non-Profit organization.

== Teams ==
The Dallas Derby Devils has 7 teams: an all-star travel team known as the Army of Darkness an all-star b-team the Battalion of Doom, and five home teams, the Death Row Rumblers, the High Seas Hotties, the Slaughters, the Suicide Shifters and the Wrecking Crew.

In 2018, the league integrated the Rolling Rebellion, a junior roller derby team competing in JRDA tournaments. This expanded Dallas' program to include youth ages 7-17 years of age.

Upon the return to gameplay from COVID-19 restrictions in 2021, the Dallas Derby Devils developed the Hellraisers. This open-gender team competes under the WFTDA and USA Roller Sports (USARS) rulesets. The Hellraisers is a reboot of the beloved original Dallas Derby Devils travel team, the Hell Razors.

=== Dallas Derby Devils Home Team Champions ===
Dallas Derby Devils logo pre-2017

Season	First Place
2006	The High Seas Hotties
2007	The Slaughterers
2008	The Slaughterers
2009	The Slaughterers
2010	The High Seas Hotties
2011	The Slaughterers
2012	The Suicide Shifters
2013	The Wrecking Crew
2014	The Death Row Rumblers
2015	The Death Row Rumblers
2016	Wrecking Crew
2017	Slaughterers
2018	Death Row Rumblers
2019	Death Row Rumblers
2020	No Home Games (COVID-19)
2021	No Home Games (COVID-19)
2022	Wrecking Crew

== WFTDA competition ==
The Dallas Derby Devils' all-star travel team is called the Army of Darkness, and is composed of 20 members from all five of the Dallas Derby Devils home teams. Army of Darkness competes in interleague game play with other WFTDA member leagues. Dallas also fields an all-star b-team called the Battalion of Doom.

Dallas has made various appearances at WFTDA Playoffs over the years. In 2013, Dallas competed at the first Division 2 Playoff, held in Des Moines, Iowa. Dallas entered the tournament as the ninth seed, and finished the weekend in fifth place. In 2015, Dallas hosted a Division 1 Playoff tournament, for which they themselves also qualified. They entered the weekend as the sixth seed, and finished in fifth place. In 2016, Dallas returned to Division 1 Playoffs in Montreal, entering as the fifth seed and finishing in the same position. In 2017, Dallas again hosted a Division 1 playoff, at which they won their opening game in the final jam, 170-162 over Santa Cruz Derby Girls. Dallas then lost their quarterfinal to Texas Rollergirls 248-89, and finished their weekend with a consolation round win over Arizona Roller Derby of 183-153.

In 2018, Dallas was eligible for Playoffs with a ranking of 27 overall in the June 30 rankings update, but declined their invitation to Playoffs.

Dallas was not eligible for Playoffs in the June 2019 rankings update.

There was no competitive WFTDA roller derby from 2020 through 2022 due to restrictions put in place as a result of COVID-19. Competitive ranked gameplay returns in 2023.

=== Rankings ===
Season	Final ranking	Playoffs	Championship
2006	19	—	14
2007	23	R1 W	DNQ
2008	N/A	12 W	DNQ
2009	4 SC	4 SC	DNQ
2010	8 SC	8 SC	DNQ
2011	14 SC	DNQ	DNQ
2012	14 SC	DNQ	DNQ
2013	60 WFTDA	5 D2	DNQ
2014	60 WFTDA	DNQ	DNQ
2015	19 WFTDA	5 D1	DNQ
2016	12 WFTDA	5 D1	DNQ
2017	27 WFTDA	CR D1	DNQ
2018	29 WFTDA	DNP	DNQ
2019	39 WFTDA	DNQ	DNQ
2020	COVID-19		
2021	COVID-19		
2022	COVID-19		
2023			

- CR = consolation round
- DNP = did not play
- COVID-19 = as a result of restrictions, no WFTDA derby was played

Partial travel team bouting history as of May 2012 - Bolded results indicate Dallas victories
Date	Opponent	Score	Location	Tournament
May 12, 2012	Green Country Roller Girls	**173–115**	Tulsa, OK
October 22, 2011	Green Country Roller Girls	117–150	Tulsa, OK
July 16, 2011	Big Easy Rollergirls	**179–23**	Home
June 26, 2011	Dutchland Derby Rollers	78–162	Feasterville, PA	East Coast Derby Extravaganza
June 25, 2011	Steel City Derby Demons	40–215	Feasterville, PA	East Coast Derby Extravaganza
June 18, 2011	Pueblo Derby Devil Dollz	**253–68**	Home
June 4, 2011	Gold Coast Derby Grrls	116–124	Miami, FL
April 23, 2011	Assassination City Roller Derby	**107–92**	Home
April 2, 2011	West Texas Roller Dollz	**185–112**	North Richland Hills, TX	Clover Cup
April 2, 2011	Houston Roller Derby	59–223	North Richland Hills, TX	Clover Cup
April 2, 2011	Duke City Derby	102–134	North Richland Hills, TX	Clover Cup
February 13, 2011	Big Easy Rollergirls	**145–77**	Beaumont, TX	2011 Governors Cup Tournament
February 13, 2011	Houston Roller Derby	104–153	Beaumont, TX	2011 Governors Cup Tournament
February 12, 2011	Alamo City Rollergirls	**197–51**	Beaumont, TX	2011 Governors Cup Tournament
February 12, 2011	Houston Roller Derby	87–124	Beaumont, TX	2011 Governors Cup Tournament
February 12, 2011	Assassination City Roller Derby	**134–39**	Beaumont, TX	2011 Governors Cup Tournament
February 21, 2010	Texas Rollergirls	24–156	Austin, Texas	2010 Governors Cup Tournament
February 21, 2010	Houston Roller Derby	**163–91**	Austin, Texas	2010 Governors Cup Tournament
February 20, 2010	Houston Roller Derby	**174–64**	Austin, Texas	2010 Governors Cup Tournament
February 20, 2010	Texas Rollergirls	35–166	Austin, Texas	2010 Governors Cup Tournament
June 6, 2009	Duke City Derby	86–137	Rio Rancho, NM
May 31, 2009	Green Country Roller Girls	**139–48**	Tulsa, OK
April 25, 2009	Tampa Bay Derby Darlins	**165–82**	Tampa, FL
March 28, 2009	No Coast Derby Girls	**133–52**	Lincoln, NE
March 7, 2009	Assassination City Roller Derby	**228–60**	Home
February 8, 2009	Atlanta Rollergirls	**115–108**	Home
October 4, 2008	Houston Roller Derby	65–90	Houston, TX	2008 WFTDA Western Regional Tournament
October 3, 2008	Denver Roller Dolls	61–118	Houston, TX	2008 WFTDA Western Regional Tournament
October 3, 2008	Tucson Roller Derby	52–112	Houston, TX	2008 WFTDA Western Regional Tournament
September 21, 2008	West Texas Roller Dollz	**186–58**	Home	2008 Governors Cup Tournament
August 9, 2008	Boston Derby Dames	46–113	Boston, MA
June 29, 2008	Angel City Derby Girls	**162–66**	Home
May 31, 2008	Duke City Derby	62–63	Home
April 19, 2008	Pikes Peak Derby Dames	58–89	Colorado Springs, CO
February 9, 2008	Northwest Arkansas Rollergirls	**104–29**	Home
January 20, 2008	Charm City Roller Girls	89–117	Baltimore, MD
November 17, 2007	Rocky Mountain Rollergirls	73–89	Home
September 16, 2007	Houston Roller Derby	90–114	Houston, TX
February 16, 2007	Kansas City Roller Warriors	61–140	Tucson, AZ	Dust Devil
January 20, 2007	Pikes Peak Derby Dames	**117–53**	Home
