= Memphis Roller Derby =

Roller derby league

- Metro area: Memphis, Tennessee
- Country: United States
- Founded: 2006
- Teams: Memphis A-tracks (A Team); Memphis B-sides (B team)
- Track type(s): Flat
- Venue: Pipkin Building at MidSouth Fairgrounds, Memphis
- Affiliations: WFTDA
- Website: http://www.memphisrollerderby.com

Memphis Roller Derby, or MRD, is a women's flat-track roller derby league based in Memphis, Tennessee. Founded in 2006, Memphis Roller Derby is a member of the Women's Flat Track Derby Association (WFTDA).

== History ==
In January 2006 Sam Red discovered modern roller derby via the A&E reality TV show Rollergirls. Red enlisted friends Jen Hughes and Vicki Lassiter (known as "Elle Tempered", "Snark Attack" and "Victator", respectively), and the three women promoted the concept with flyers and also online. The first practice was scheduled for February 12 at Skateland on Summer, but after a fire there was held instead at Skateland Raleigh, and the result was the formation of four home teams: the Legion of Zoom, Angels of Death, Prisskilla Presleys, and Women of Mass Destruction.

The Hustlin' Rollers travel team played and won their first game in 2007, 83−58 over New Orleans's Big Easy Rollergirls.

Memphis Roller Derby was accepted as a member of the Women's Flat Track Derby Association in late 2008. They went undefeated 13−0 this year.

In 2011, The Hustlin' Rollers traveled to Tulsa, OK, Huntsville, AL, and Knoxville, TN for their away games and tournaments, including the Honky Tonk Stomp, Tennessee's statewide roller derby tournament.

The Hustlin' Rollers took some early hard losses in 2012, against the Oklahoma Victory Dolls and St. Louis' Arch Rival Roller Girls. Later in the season, the Hustlin' Rollers were victorious at Honky Tonk Stomp and were again Tennessee State Champions.

After a measurable dip in proficiency in the past 2 years, The Hustlin' Rollers were out of the gate strong in 2013 with an early win against Magnolia Roller Vixens but had a lackluster mid-season drop after losing to Gold Coast Derby Grrls, Duke City Roller Derby, and Dallas Derby Devils in the annual Clover Cup tournament. Memphis went on to defeat Springfield Roller Girls later in the season and secured a repeat tournament win at the annual Honky Tonk Stomp. Keeping momentum, a late season re-match with Dallas resulted in a nail-biting loss for Memphis by only 2 points.

The league home teams competed for a league championship every season starting in 2007, with the Angels of Death defeating the Women of Mass Destruction in the first three finals. The Women of Mass Destruction then won the next four league titles, beating the Angels of Death in 2010, and then the Prisskilla Prezleys the following three seasons. As of 2017, Memphis Roller Derby operates two travel teams that play teams from other leagues, and the home teams are currently dormant.

== WFTDA competition ==
2009 was the first year that Memphis qualified for WFTDA Playoffs, competing at the WFTDA South Central Regional Tournament in Atlanta. They went in as the tenth seed, and after losses to Tampa Bay Derby Darlins and Atlanta Rollergirls defeated West Texas Roller Dollz 134-82 to finish in ninth place.

In 2010, with turnover on the Memphis Hustlin' Rollers roster, they competed at the South Central Regional Tournament in Lincoln, Nebraska as the tenth seed, but lost their games against Houston Roller Derby, Dallas Derby Devils and Hard Knox Roller Girls and finished in tenth place.

=== Rankings ===
Season	Final ranking	Playoffs	Championship
2009	9 SC	10 SC	DNQ
2010	16 SC	9 SC	DNQ
2011	16 SC	DNQ	DNQ
2012	16 SC	DNQ	DNQ
2013	93 WFTDA	DNQ	DNQ
2014	132 WFTDA	DNQ	DNQ
2015	100 WFTDA	DNQ	DNQ
2016	117 WFTDA	DNQ	DNQ
2017	310 WFTDA	DNQ	DNQ
