= Houston Roller Derby =

Roller derby league

- Metro area: Houston, Texas
- Country: United States
- Founded: 2004
- Teams: All Stars (A and B team); The Bayou City Bosses; The Brawlers; The Psych Ward Sirens; The Valkyries; Machete Betties (rec team)
- Track type: Flat
- Venue: Bayou Music Center
- Affiliations: WFTDA
- Org. type: 501(c) (3)
- Website: houstonrollerderby.com

Houston Roller Derby (HRD) is a women's flat track roller derby league based in Houston, Texas. HRD was founded in early 2004, and is a founding member league of the Women's Flat Track Derby Association (WFTDA).

== History ==
Originally formed in early 2004 as the Space City Rollergirls, Houston Roller Derby split from their founding group in the pursuit of an all-skater owned league, after the founding members of Space City attempted to fire the league's coed training team. The new league focused on democratic leadership, with decisions made by committees with elected leaders. HRD's first bout took place in October 2005 at the Pasadena Convention Center, and by this time the league had about 60 members and consisted of four teams: The Bayou City Bosses, The Burlesque Brawlers, The Machete Betties and The Psych Ward Sirens. 2006 bouts took place at the Arabia Shrine Temple. The 2007 and 2008 season bouts took place at the Verizon Wireless Theater, with additional games held at Jopa Sports in Shenandoah. The 2009 and 2010 bouts took place at Kick's Indoor, and the 2011 bouts took place at Houston Indoor Sports. Houston Roller Derby filed as a public charity (Houston Rollergirls Inc. dba Houston Roller Derby) and received its tax-deductible 501(c)(3) non-profit status effective March 11, 2011. HRD's season bouts from the 2012 season forward take place in downtown Houston at Bayou Music Center (formerly the Verizon Wireless Theater).

== Teams ==
Houston Roller Derby consists of four home teams that play within the league as well as against visiting teams from other WFTDA leagues. Houston Roller Derby also has an all-star travel team, formerly called HaRD Knocks but now referred to as the all-stars, which was formed in 2006 to play against other WFTDA leagues across the U.S. and in WFTDA tournaments and competitions. The HRD all-stars were one of twelve WFTDA teams who qualified to compete in the WFTDA Championships in Philadelphia, Pennsylvania, in 2009. League skater Windigo played for Team Canada at the 2011 Roller Derby World Cup.

Houston Roller Derby formed the travel team in 2006 to play against other WFTDA leagues across the country and in tournaments and competitions. The team's first interleague competition was the Dust Devil National Flat Track Derby Tournament held in February 2006. The Texas Rollergirls from Austin won the 20-team tournament held in Tucson, Arizona; HRD placed 13th.

== WFTDA competition ==
Houston Roller Derby competed at the first WFTDA Championships, the "Dust Devil" tournament, in 2006, where they finished in 13th place. Houston next competed at WFTDA Playoffs in 2008 as the 11th seed at that year's WFTDA Western Regional Tournament and finished in ninth place. Ahead of the 2009 season, the WFTDA adjusted its structure, and Houston was placed in the South Central Region. At that year's WFTDA South Central Regional Tournament, Houston was the third seed and finished in third place with a 113–101 victory over the Dallas Derby Devils to qualify for Championships. At Championships, Houston was eliminated by a 239–46 loss to Rocky Mountain Rollergirls in the opening round. In 2010, Houston was the seventh seed at the South Central Regional, and finished in seventh place by defeating Dallas 150–69. As the fifth seed at the 2011 South Central Playoff, Houston again finished in the seeded position at fifth, with a 173–157 victory over No Coast Derby Girls. At the final South Central Regional in 2012, Houston was the third seed but went 1-2 and finished in ninth place by beating Jacksonville RollerGirls 255–155.

In 2013 the WFTDA restructured playoffs again, and under the new divisional model Houston qualified as a Division 1 team as the seventh seed for the tournament in Asheville, North Carolina, and finished in sixth place after a 202–185 loss to Steel City Derby Demons. Houston was the ninth seed at the 2014 Evansville Division 1 tournament, but lost their three games to finish in tenth. In 2015, Houston competed as the third seed at the Division 2 Playoff in Cleveland, and finished in fourth place, losing their final game to Santa Cruz Derby Girls 154–141. Houston returned to Division 2 in 2016 at Wichita as the second seed, but ultimately finished in sixth place, ending their weekend with a 184–181 loss to the Boulder County Bombers. In 2017 Houston returned to Division 1 Playoffs as the eleventh seed in Dallas, but lost to Queen City Roller Girls 195-104 and to Atlanta Rollergirls 323–143 to finish out of the medal round. In 2018 Houston received an invitation to a WFTDA Continental Cup, but declined their invitation.

WFTDA competition, including championships, went on hiatus following the 2019 competition. The COVID-19 pandemic caused significant disruption to the sport, leading to the cancellation of the 2020 Championships and subsequent years. In 2023, the WFTDA announced a significant restructuring of its competitive play system, with a return to playoffs and championships in a new regional format for 2024.

=== Rankings ===
Season	Final ranking	Playoffs	Championship
2006	20 WFTDA	—	13
2007	21 WFTDA	DNQ	DNQ
2008	2 SC	9 W	DNQ
2009	3 SC	3 SC	R1
2010	7 SC	7 SC	DNQ
2011	5 SC	5 SC	DNQ
2012	7 SC	9 SC	DNQ
2013	26 WFTDA	6 D1	DNQ
2014	45 WFTDA	10 D1	DNQ
2015	49 WFTDA	4 D2	DNQ
2016	52 WFTDA	6 D2	DNQ
2017	33 WFTDA	CR D1	DNQ
2018	31 WFTDA	DNP CC NA West	DNQ
2019	31 WFTDA	DNQ	DNQ

- CR = consolation round
- DNP = did not play

=== Partial WFTDA sanctioned results ===
Partial travel team bouting history as of November 2011
Date	Opponent	Score	Location
10/02/11	No Coast Derby Girls	173 HRD; 157 NCDG	Kansas City, Missouri, Show Me Der-B-Q - 2011 WFTDA South Central Regional Tournament
10/01/11	Omaha Rollergirls	170 HRD; 103 OR	Kansas City, Missouri, Show Me Der-B-Q - 2011 WFTDA South Central Regional Tournament
10/01/11	Gold Coast Derby Grrls	138 HRD; 106 HRD	Kansas City, Missouri, Show Me Der-B-Q - 2011 WFTDA South Central Regional Tournament
09/30/11	Atlanta Rollergirls	133 AR; 117 HRD	Kansas City, Missouri, Show Me Der-B-Q - 2011 WFTDA South Central Regional Tournament
09/10/11	Assassination City Roller Derby	182 HRD; 75 ACRD	Ft. Worth, Texas
07/30/11	Montreal Roller Derby	126 MRD; 121 HRD	Houston, Texas
07/10/11	Windy City Rollers	171 WCR; 74 HRD	Chicago, Illinois
07/08/11	Boston Derby Dames	102 BDD; 96 HRD	Boston, Massachusetts
05/28/11	Harrisburg Area Roller Derby	303 HRD; 59 HARD	Houston, Texas, 2011 Comicpalooza Convention
05/14/11	Green Country Roller Girls	166 HRD; 55 GCRG	Huntsville, Alabama, 2011 Rocket City Rumble Tournament
05/14/11	Atlanta Rollergirls	107 AR; 73 HRD	Huntsville, Alabama, 2011 Rocket City Rumble Tournament
04/03/11	Green Country Roller Girls	255 HRD; 53 GCRG	Dallas, Texas, 2011 Clover Cup Tournament
04/03/11	Texas Rollergirls	119 TXRG; 69 HRD	Dallas, Texas, 2011 Clover Cup Tournament
04/02/11	Dallas Derby Devils	223 HRD; 59 DDD	Dallas, Texas, 2011 Clover Cup Tournament
04/02/11	Texas Rollergirls	144 TXRG; 90 HRD	Dallas, Texas, 2011 Clover Cup Tournament
03/06/11	Ohio Rollergirls	193 HRD; 60 OR	Tampa Bay, Florida, 2011 Franky Panky Tournament
03/06/11	Gold Coast Derby Grrls	214 HRD; 38 GCDG	Tampa Bay, Florida, 2011 Franky Panky Tournament
03/05/11	Tampa Bay Derby Darlins	107 HRD; 55 TBDD	Tampa Bay, Florida, 2011 Franky Panky Tournament
02/13/11	Texas Rollergirls	197 TXRG; 71 HRD	Beaumont, Texas, 2011 Governor's Cup Tournament
02/13/11	Dallas Derby Devils	153 HRD; 104 DDD	Beaumont, Texas, 2011 Governor's Cup Tournament
02/13/11	Texas Rollergirls	158 TXRG; 40 HRD	Beaumont, Texas, 2011 Governor's Cup Tournament
02/12/11	Spindletop Roller Girls	208 HRD; 45 SRG	Beaumont, Texas, 2011 Governor's Cup Tournament
02/12/11	Dallas Derby Devils	124 HRD; 87 DDD	Beaumont, Texas, 2011 Governor's Cup Tournament
10/10/10	Dallas Derby Devils	150 HRD; 69 DDD	Lincoln, Nebraska, Amber Waves of Pain - 2010 WFTDA South Central Regional Tournament
10/09/10	Tampa Bay Derby Darlins	144 TBDD; 129 HRD	Lincoln, Nebraska, Amber Waves of Pain - 2010 WFTDA South Central Regional Tournament
10/08/10	Memphis Roller Derby	237 HRD; 61 MRD	Lincoln, Nebraska, Amber Waves of Pain - 2010 WFTDA South Central Regional Tournament
10/08/10	Atlanta Rollergirls	153 AR; 92 HRD	Lincoln, Nebraska, Amber Waves of Pain - 2010 WFTDA South Central Regional Tournament
08/28/10	Assassination City Roller Derby	276 HRD; 40 ACRD	Fort Worth, Texas, 2010 Clover Cup Tournament
07/25/10	Brewcity Bruisers	120 BB; 102 HRD	Milwaukee, Wisconsin
07/24/10	Mad Rollin' Dolls Roller Derby	180 MRDRD; 80 HRD	Madison, Wisconsin
06/05/10	Steel City Derby Demons	218 SCDD; 67 HRD	Houston
05/01/10	Dixie Derby Girls	188 HRD; 33 DDD	Houston Texas
03/07/10	Tampa Bay Derby Darlins	150 TBDD; 143 HRD	Fort Worth, Texas, 2010 Clover Cup Tournament
03/06/10	Dallas Derby Devils	141 DDD; 54 HRD	Fort Worth, Texas, 2010 Clover Cup Tournament
02/21/10	Dallas Derby Devils	163 DDD; 91 HRD	Austin, Texas, 2010 Governors Cup Tournament
02/20/10	Dallas Derby Devils	174 DDD; 64 HRD	Austin, Texas, 2010 Governors Cup Tournament
02/20/10	Assassination City Roller Derby	168 HRD; 60 ACRD	Austin, Texas, 2010 Governors Cup Tournament
11/13/09	Rocky Mountain Rollergirls	239 RMRG; 46 HRD	Philadelphia, Pennsylvania, Declaration of Derby - 2009 WFTDA National Championship
05/02/09	Dirty South Derby Girls	127 HRD; 181 DSDG	Houston, Texas
10/04/08	Dallas Derby Devils	90 HRD; 65 DDD	Houston, Texas, BattleRoyale - 2008 WFTDA Western Regional Tournament
02/09/08	Pikes Peak Derby Dames	117 PPDD; 97 HRD	Colorado Springs, Colorado
01/06/08	Memphis Roller Derby	126 HRD; 58 MRD	Memphis, Tennessee
09/16/07	Dallas Derby Devils	114 HRD; 90 DDD	Houston, Texas

== In media ==
In 2009, members of Houston Roller Derby were featured in Hard Knocks: Rolling with the Derby Girls, a photo collection book by Houston photographer Shelley Canton.
