= Hard Knox Roller Girls =

Roller derby league

- Metro area: Knoxville, Tennessee
- Country: United States
- Founded: February 2006
- Teams: HKRG Allstars (A team); HKRG Brawlers (B team)
- Track type: Flat
- Venue: Cooper Athletic Center at Maryville College
- Affiliations: WFTDA
- Website: http://www.hardknoxrollergirls.com/

Hard Knox Roller Girls (HKRG) is a women's flat-track roller derby league based in Knoxville, Tennessee. Founded in 2006, HKRG is a member of the Women's Flat Track Derby Association (WFTDA).

== History and structure ==
After forming in 2006, Hard Knox played in multiple venues before moving to the Knoxville Civic Coliseum. In 2016, HKRG relocated to the Cooper Athletic Center at Maryville College and celebrated their tenth anniversary season. HKRG is a 501(c)3 non-profit organization that is skater owned and operated, and a portion of all proceeds from each bout is donated to charity. Hard Knox became a member of the WFTDA in early 2009.

The HKRG league comprises two teams: Hard Knox Roller Girls Allstars (WFTDA A team) and Brawlers (B team).

== WFTDA competition ==
In 2010, Hard Knox qualified for WFTDA Playoffs for the first time, as the ninth seed at the WFTDA South Central Regional Tournament in Lincoln. Nebraska. Knoxville lost their first two games to No Coast Derby Girls (Lincoln) and Tampa Bay Derby Darlins, but then won their final game against Memphis Roller Derby 165–124 to claim ninth place.

=== Rankings ===
Season	Final ranking	Playoffs	Championship
2009	13 SC	DNQ	DNQ
2010	9 SC	9 SC	DNQ
2011	12 SC	DNQ	DNQ
2012	22 SC	DNQ	DNQ
2013	109 WFTDA	DNQ	DNQ
2014	127 WFTDA	DNQ	DNQ
2015	115 WFTDA	DNQ	DNQ
2016	247 WFTDA	DNQ	DNQ
