= West Texas Roller Derby =

Roller derby league

- Metro area: Lubbock, Texas
- Country: United States
- Founded: 2007
- Track type(s): Flat
- Venue: Lubbock Civic Center
- Affiliations: WFTDA
- Website: westtexasrollerderby.com

West Texas Roller Derby is a women's flat track roller derby league based in Lubbock, Texas. Founded in 2007, the league currently consists of a single team, which competes against teams from other leagues. West Texas is a member of the Women's Flat Track Derby Association (WFTDA).

== History ==
West Texas was founded as the West Texas Roller Dollz in September 2007. The league's first bout was held in May 2008, attracting 2,000 fans, and it was accepted as a member of the Women's Flat Track Derby Association (WFTDA) in August 2008.

== WFTDA competition ==
West Texas was the eighth seed for the 2009 WFTDA South Central Regional Tournament. West Texas lost their three games, 109–79 to No Coast Derby Girls, 212–49 to Nashville Rollergirls and 134–82 to Memphis Roller Derby and finished the weekend in tenth place.

=== Rankings ===
Season	Final ranking	Playoffs	Championship
2008	4 SC	N/A	N/A
2009	11 SC	10 SC	DNQ
2010	15 SC	DNQ	DNQ
2011	24 SC	DNQ	DNQ
2012	34 SC	DNQ	DNQ
2013	164 WFTDA	DNQ	DNQ
2014	200 WFTDA	DNQ	DNQ
2015	234 WFTDA	DNQ	DNQ
2016	273 WFTDA	DNQ	DNQ
2017	210 WFTDA	DNQ	DNQ
2018	215 WFTDA	DNQ	DNQ
2019	234 WFTDA	DNQ	DNQ
2020-2023	N/A Covid	N/A	N/A
2024			
