= South Central Region (WFTDA) =

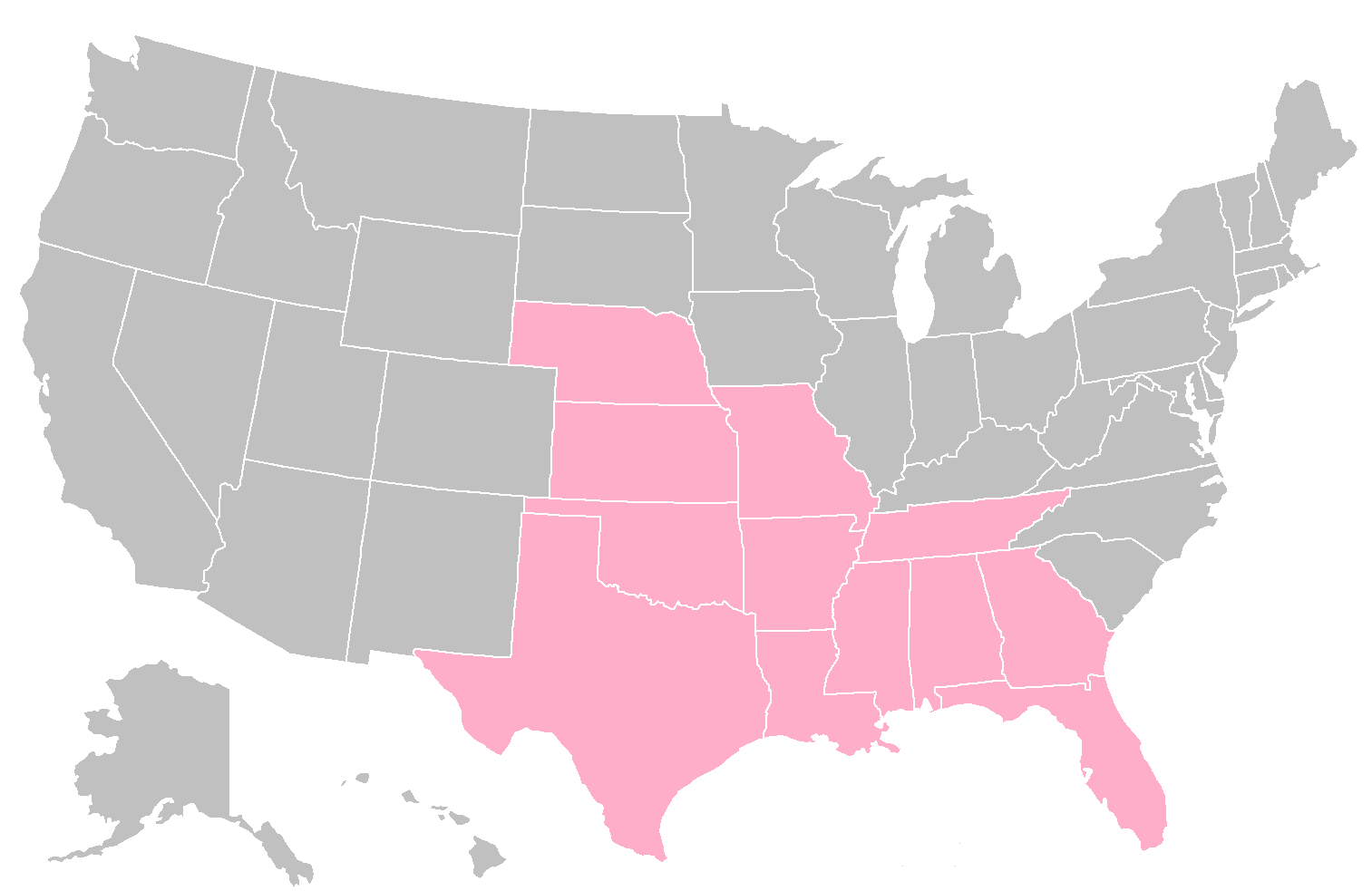
WFTDA South Central Region

The Women's Flat Track Derby Association's South Central Region was formed in 2008 when WFTDA changed from having just two regional tournaments (East and West) to five—consisting of teams from four regions: East, North Central, South Central and West.

For 2011, the region was expanded, taking in leagues from Nebraska and New Mexico.

WFTDA has now moved away from the Big 5 WFTDA Championships qualification tournament structure, which was last competed in 2012. Starting with the 2013 WFTDA season, the regions were discontinued in favour of an overall-rankings based system, and a new playoff format was created.

== Current lineup ==
| League | Metro area | Admitted | Notes |
|---|---|---|---|
| Alamo City Rollergirls | San Antonio, TX | 1 January 2009 | Transferred from West Region |
| Assassination City Roller Derby | Dallas, TX | 1 January 2009 | Transferred from West Region |
| Atlanta Rollergirls | Atlanta, GA | 1 January 2009 | Transferred from East Region |
| Big Easy Rollergirls | New Orleans, LA | 1 January 2009 | Transferred from East Region |
| Blue Ridge Rollergirls | Asheville, NC | 1 March 2012 | |
| Cajun Rollergirls | Houma, LA | 7 March 2013 | |
| Chattanooga Roller Girls | Chattanooga, TN | 7 September 2012 | |
| Classic City Rollergirls | Athens, GA | 1 March 2012 | |
| Dallas Derby Devils | Dallas, TX | 1 January 2009 | Transferred from West Region |
| Des Moines Derby Dames | Des Moines, IA | 1 September 2010 | |
| Dixie Derby Girls | Huntsville, AL | 1 January 2009 | Transferred from East Region |
| Duke City Derby | Albuquerque, NM | 1 January 2011 | Transferred from West Region |
| Gainesville Roller Rebels | Gainesville, FL | 3 December 2012 | |
| Gold Coast Derby Grrls | Fort Lauderdale, FL | 1 March 2011 | |
| Green Country Roller Girls | Tulsa, OK | 1 January 2009 | Transferred from West Region |
| Hard Knox Roller Girls | Knoxville, TN | March 2009 | |
| Houston Roller Derby | Houston, TX | 1 January 2009 | Transferred from West Region |
| Hub City Derby Dames | Hattiesburg, MS | 7 March 2013 | |
| ICT Rollergirls | Wichita, KS | 17 June 2010 | |
| Jacksonville RollerGirls | Jacksonville, FL | 1 December 2010 | |
| Kansas City Roller Warriors | Kansas City, MO | 1 January 2009 | Transferred from West Region |
| Little City Roller Girls | Johnson City, TN | 1 September 2011 | |
| Magnolia Roller Vixens | Jackson, MS | 3 December 2012 | |
| Memphis Roller Derby | Memphis, TN | 1 January 2009 | Transferred |
| Mid Iowa Rollers | Des Moines, IA | 1 December 2011 | |
| Mississippi Rollergirls | Ocean Springs, MS | 3 December 2012 | |
| Nashville Rollergirls | Nashville, TN | 1 January 2009 | Transferred from East Region |
| No Coast Derby Girls | Lincoln, NE | 1 January 2009 | Transferred from West Region |
| Northwest Arkansas Rollergirls | Fayetteville, AR | 1 January 2009 | Transferred from West Region |
| Oklahoma City Roller Derby | Oklahoma City, OK | 1 March 2011 | |
| Oklahoma Victory Dolls | Oklahoma City, OK | 1 January 2009 | Transferred from West Region |
| Omaha Rollergirls | Omaha, NE | 1 January 2011 | Transferred from North Central Region |
| Red Stick Roller Derby | Baton Rouge, LA | 1 December 2011 | |
| Sioux City Roller Dames | Sioux City, IA | 1 March 2012 | |
| Spindletop Roller Girls | Beaumont, TX | 1 December 2010 | |
| Soul City Sirens | Augusta, GA | 7 March 2013 | |
| Springfield Rollergirls | Springfield, MO | 1 June 2011 | |
| Tallahassee RollerGirls | Tallahassee, FL | 31 March 2009 | |
| Tampa Bay Derby Darlins | Tampa, FL | 1 January 2009 | Transferred |
| Texas Rollergirls | Austin, TX | 1 January 2009 | Transferred from West Region |
| Tragic City Rollers | Birmingham, AL | 1 March 2012 | |
| West Texas Roller Dollz | Lubbock, TX | 1 January 2009 | Transferred from West Region |

== Former members ==
| League | Metro area | Admitted | Left | Notes |
|---|---|---|---|---|
| East Texas Bombers | Tyler, TX | 1 January 2009 | 2009 | Transferred from West Region; disbanded but later reformed. |

== Rankings ==
Current Official WFTDA Regional Rankings as of January 29, 2013

| Region | South Central |
| 1 | Texas Rollergirls |
| 2 | Atlanta Rollergirls |
| 3 | Kansas City Roller Warriors |
| 4 | Tampa Bay Derby Darlins |
| 5 | No Coast Derby Girls |
| 6 | Nashville Rollergirls |
| 7 | Houston Rollergirls |
| 8 | Omaha Rollergirls |
| 9 | Jacksonville Rollergirls |
| 10 | Tallahassee Rollergirls |
| 11 | Mid Iowa Rollers |
| 12 | Blue Ridge Rollergirls |
| 13 | Duke City Derby |
| 14 | Dallas Derby Devils |
| 15 | Oklahoma Victory Dolls |
| 16 | Memphis Roller Derby |
| 17 | Gold Coast Derby Grrls |
| 18 | Sioux City Roller Dames |
| 19 | Springfield Rollergirls |
| 20 | Alamo City Rollergirls |
| 21 | Des Moines Derby Dames |
| 22 | Hard Knox Rollergirls |
| 23 | ICT Rollergirls |
| 24 | Big Easy Rollergirls |
| 25 | Assassination City Roller Derby |
| 26 | Dixie Derby Girls |
| 27 | Northwest Arkansas Roller Derby |
| 28 | Oklahoma City Roller Derby |
| 29 | Tragic City Rollers |
| 30 | Little City Roller Girls |
| 31 | Spindletop Roller Girls |
| 32 | Chattanooga Roller Girls |
| 33 | Red Stick Roller Derby |
| 34 | West Texas Roller Dollz |

Member teams unranked at this time:

- Classic City Rollergirls
- Gainesville Roller Rebels
- Magnolia Roller Vixens
- Mississippi Rollergirls

== Region Champions ==
- 2009 - Texas Rollergirls
- 2010 - Kansas City Roller Warriors
- 2011 - Texas Rollergirls
- 2012 - Texas Rollergirls

== Hydra Trophy winners produced ==
- 2006 - Texas Rollergirls
- 2007 - Kansas City Roller Warriors

== South Central Region titles won by league ==
| League | Number of Championships Won | Last Year Won |
|---|---|---|
| Kansas City Roller Warriors | 1 | 2010 |
| Texas Rollergirls | 3 | 2012 |

== See also ==
- East Region
- West Region
- North Central Region
