= Tragic City Rollers =

Roller derby league

- Metro area: Birmingham, AL
- Country: United States
- Founded: 2005
- Track type: Flat
- Venue: Zamora Shrine Temple
- Affiliations: WFTDA
- Website: tragiccityrollers.com

The Tragic City Rollers is a women's flat track roller derby league based in Birmingham, Alabama. Founded in 2005, Tragic City is a member of the Women's Flat Track Derby Association (WFTDA).

== History ==
The league was founded in December 2005 by Dixie Thrash, after hearing about the Texas Rollergirls, and training with the Dixie Derby Girls for two months. The league's first bout was also against Dixie, in April 2006.

Tragic City was accepted into the WFTDA Apprentice Program in October 2010, and became a full member of the WFTDA in March 2012.

== WFTDA rankings ==
Season	Final ranking	Playoffs	Championship
2012	29 SC	DNQ	DNQ
2013	170 WFTDA	DNQ	DNQ
2014	149 WFTDA	DNQ	DNQ
2015	134 WFTDA	DNQ	DNQ
2016	209 WFTDA	DNQ	DNQ
2017	268 WFTDA	DNQ	DNQ
2018	166 WFTDA	DNQ	DNQ
2019	123 WFTDA	DNQ	DNQ
2023	13 WFTDA NA South Region	DNQ	DNQ
2024	24 WFTDA NA South Region	DNQ	DNQ
2025	36 WFTDA NA South Region	DNQ	DNQ
