= Tallahassee RollerGirls =

Roller derby league

- Metro area: Tallahassee, FL
- Country: United States
- Founded: 2006
- Teams: Capital Punishment (A team); Jailbreak Betties (B team); Legiskators; Sinators
- Track type: Flat
- Venue: Hansel Tookes Center at Florida A&M University
- Affiliations: WFTDA
- Org. type: LLC
- Website: http://tallahasseerollergirls.com/

Tallahassee RollerGirls is a women's flat-track roller derby league based in Tallahassee, Florida. Founded in 2006, Tallahassee is a member of the Women's Flat Track Derby Association (WFTDA).

== History and organization ==
The league was founded in 2006, and joined the Women's Flat Track Derby Association (WFTDA) in 2009 as a South Central Region league. Florida State University student Adrianne Chaplin posted a flyer about roller derby and Melissa Smith responded, who organized the first meeting of 12 women in January 2006. The league practiced at a skating rink in Georgia prior to relocating to the Tallahassee Skate Inn. In 2012, the league moved to their current venue, the Hansel Tookes Center at Florida A&M University. Capital Punishment played their first game against Panama City March 24, 2007 and went on to win 6 out of 7 of their first season games, losing only to the Tampa Bay Derby Darlins. Their second season consisted of 7 wins and 1 loss to a home team of founding WFTDA member, Texas Rollergirls. In their third season (2009) the Jailbreak Betties, Tallahassee's second team, lost in their inaugural bout against Burn City Rollers from Auburn, Alabama. The league increased the number of bouts to 17 in 2010, and 23 in 2011 between the two teams.

Tallahassee Rollergirls has two travel teams, Capital Punishment and the Jailbreak Betties. Capital Punishment competes in interleague games which count towards WFTDA national rankings and the Jailbreak Betties function as a training league. Tallahassee also has two home teams, the Legiskators and the Sinators.

As of 2023, the Tallahassee Rollergirls continue to be a prominent roller derby league, playing a significant role in both local and national flat-track roller derby competitions. The league has maintained its commitment to promoting the sport of roller derby in the Tallahassee area, while fostering a strong, inclusive community of skaters.

== WFTDA competition ==
Capital Punishment began their 2012 season with a win against the Green Country Roller Girls who were ranked seventh in the South Central Region at the time. 2012 also marked the first time the league qualified as the ninth seed at the final WFTDA South Central Regional Tournament and finished in eighth place. In 2013, Tallahassee qualified for the newly created Division 2 Playoffs in Des Moines, Iowa, but finished in tenth place, ending their weekend with a 345–135 loss to DC Rollergirls.

=== Rankings ===
Season	Final ranking	Playoffs	Championship
2009	14 SC	DNQ	DNQ
2010	13 SC	DNQ	DNQ
2011	15 SC	DNQ	DNQ
2012	10 SC	8 SC	DNQ
2013	83 WFTDA	10 D2	DNQ
2014	143 WFTDA	DNQ	DNQ
2015	194 WFTDA	DNQ	DNQ
2016	156 WFTDA	DNQ	DNQ
2017	187 WFTDA	DNQ	DNQ

== Community involvement ==
Tallahassee RollerGirls have donated proceeds to local and national charities in the past including Refuge House, National Public Radio, American Cancer Society, American Heart Association, and are founding members of the Oasis Center for Women & Girls. In addition to raising money for charities, some members founded Spread the Love Charity.

=== Spread the Love charity ===
Spread the Love charity was organized in November 2009 by teammates and friends of Stephanie "Danger S" Little shortly after she was diagnosed with cervical cancer. Danger S joined the Tallahassee RollerGirls earlier that year and was elected assistant coach before being diagnosed. She died in February 2010, but the Spread the Love Charity created to assist her now continues to fund exams for women in need and raise awareness of cervical cancer. The team uniform includes a patch in her memory that reads "Danger S. Ones".
