= LCRG =

LCRG may refer to:

- Lilac City Roller Girls, from Spokane, Washington
- Little City Roller Girls, from Johnson City, Tennessee
