= Green Country Roller Girls =

Roller derby league

- Metro area: Tulsa, OK
- Country: United States
- Founded: 2006
- Dissolved: 2012
- Teams: All Stars (A team); Thunder Dolls (B team)
- Track type(s): Flat
- Venue: Tulsa Convention Center
- Affiliations: WFTDA
- Website: www.greencountryrollergirls.com

The Green Country Roller Girls was a women's flat track roller derby league based in Tulsa, Oklahoma. Founded in 2006, the league consisted of two teams which competed in interleague games.

Green Country began bouting soon after forming, and played its first home bout against the Big Easy Rollergirls in May 2007. Green Country Roller Girls was a member of the Women's Flat Track Derby Association (WFTDA) and their All Stars team played in WFTDA sanctioned games that counted towards national rankings.

In 2011, Tulsa qualified for the WFTDA South Central Regional Tournament for the only time. Seeded eighth, they finished in seventh place with a 144-97 victory over the Gold Coast Derby Grrls.

The league announced that it would disband in June 2012. The WFTDA announced in July that it was suspending the league's membership, pending a decision on whether skaters in Tulsa were transferring membership to a new organization, or forming a group which would not be affiliated with the association. In 2013, a new organization called Roughneck Roller Derby, featuring former members of Green Country, was granted membership in the WFTDA.

Season	Final ranking	Playoffs	Championship
2008	8 SC	DNQ	DNQ
2009	12 SC	DNQ	DNQ
2010	11 SC	DNQ	DNQ
2011	7 SC	7 SC	DNQ
