= Tropic Terrors Derby League =

Puerto Rican roller derby league

- Metro area: Carolina, Puerto Rico
- Country: United States
- Founded: 2011
- Teams: Reckless Bandidas
- Track type: Flat
- Venue: Cancha Comunal, St Just
- Affiliations: WFTDA
- Website: www.tropicterrors.com

The Tropic Terrors Derby League (TTDL) is a roller derby league based in Carolina, Puerto Rico. Founded in 2011, the league consists of a single team, which competes against teams from other leagues.

The league was founded in January 2011 by Nidzy Moringlane de Rivera, who had become interested in the sport while in Canada, although she had not previously played. An initial meeting to establish the level of interest in forming a team attracted 33 women.

Several other leagues developed from the Tropic Terrors. Wicked Island Roller Derby League split from the Tropic Terrors in April, while the West Side Rollers, representing the west coast of the island, left later in the year, in order that it and the Tropic Terrors could each focus solely on a more coherent area.

League members played their first official bout in October 2011 alongside members of Enchanted Island Roller Derby League on an All Star Team created to compete against the Dixie Derby Girls. By early 2012, the league was practicing four times a week. In July 2012, it was accepted as a member of the Women's Flat Track Derby Association Apprentice Programme.
