= NWA Roller Derby =

Roller derby league

- Metro area: Fayetteville, Arkansas
- Country: United States
- Founded: 2006
- Dissolved: 2019
- Teams: NWA Roller Derby
- Track type(s): Flat
- Venue: Starlight Skatium
- Affiliations: WFTDA
- Org. type: 501(c)3

NWA Roller Derby (Northwest Arkansas Roller Derby) was a flat track roller derby league based in Fayetteville, Arkansas, (USA). Founded in early 2006, NWA Roller Derby was the first flat track league in Arkansas to play a version of roller derby using new standardized rules and a track design that was based on the dimensions of the old banked tracks, made popular by the founders of modern roller derby, the Texas Rollergirls. NWA Roller Derby also became the first member league out of Arkansas of the national organization, the Women's Flat Track Derby Association, announced by the WFTDA in December 2007.

In July, 2018 NWA Roller Derby were accepted by the I.R.S. as a 501(c)3 charitable organization. In late 2019, NWA Roller Derby merged with Benton County Roller Derby (est. 2010), forming what was announced as Natural State Roller Derby (NSRD) in early 2020. Due to the COVID-19 pandemic that year, NSRD paused practice and games until late 2021. NSRD resumed practice and game play in the 2022 season.

The league has been featured in reports on KNWA-TV, and the Arkansas Democrat-Gazette. By late 2010, NWA was one of three flat-track derby leagues in Arkansas.

== History ==
The early beginnings of NWA Roller Derby consisted of two home teams, the Twisted Sisters and the Hardwood Harlots. Their first public bout, "Fright Night Fight", was held on October 18, 2006. A game in January 2007 drew over 1000 fans. Over the course of 2007 NWA Roller Derby held home bouts between the two teams for the general public while also premiering their newly created all-star team, the Arkansas Killbillies, a combination of top players from both home teams. At the end of 2007 NWA Roller Derby dissolved their home teams in favor of a league format consisting of two travel teams, the Arkansas Killbillies (all-star team) and the Backwoods Betties.

NWA Roller Derby merged with Benton County Roller Derby (est. 2010) in late 2019. By early 2020, the new merged league was announced as Natural State Roller Derby (NSRD). Due to the COVID-19 pandemic that year, NSRD paused practice and games until late 2021. NSRD resumed practice and game play in the 2022 season. They practice at the Starlight Stadium in Fayetteville, Arkansas with home games hosted at The Jones Center in Springdale, Arkansas. WFTDA sanctioned games restarted in 2023 after a hiatus taking in response to the COVID-19 pandemic.

== WFTDA competition ==
NWA Roller Derby consisted of the All Star Team and a B Team; the All Star team competed for WFTDA Rankings.

=== Rankings ===
Season	Final ranking	Playoffs	Championship
2008	6 SC	DNQ	DNQ
2009	10 SC	DNQ	DNQ
2010	12 SC	DNQ	DNQ
2011	20 SC	DNQ	DNQ
2012	27 SC	DNQ	DNQ
2013	89 WFTDA	DNQ	DNQ
2014	71 WFTDA	DNQ	DNQ
2015	93 WFTDA	DNQ	DNQ
2016	91 WFTDA	DNQ	DNQ
2017	154 WFTDA	DNQ	DNQ
2018	282 WFTDA	DNQ	DNQ
