= Nashville Roller Derby =

Roller derby league

- Metro area: Nashville, Tennessee
- Country: United States
- Founded: 2006
- Teams: Music City All Stars (A team); Music City Brawl Stars (B team)
- Track type(s): Flat
- Venue: Nashville Municipal Auditorium
- Affiliations: WFTDA
- Website: www.nashvillerollerderby.com

Nashville Roller Derby is a women's flat-track roller derby league based in Nashville, Tennessee. Founded as Nashville Rollergirls, the league is a member of the Women's Flat Track Derby Association (WFTDA).

== History and structure ==
The league was founded in 2006 as Nashville Rollergirls and became a member of the WFTDA in 2008. In the league's early years games were held at the Tennessee State Fairground Sports Arena, where by 2010 they were averaging 1,200 fans at games, before moving to the Nashville Municipal Auditorium. In 2022 and 2023, most games were held at the Wilson County Expo Center in Lebanon, Tennessee, with the final game of the 2023 season moving back to the Nashville fairgrounds.

In early 2019, the league announced it had rebranded as Nashville Roller Derby.

Nashville Roller Derby has two travel teams. The Music City All Stars are the premier travel team featuring the top skaters of the league. The Music City Brawl Stars are the B-team showcasing up-and-coming skaters.

== WFTDA competition ==
Former Nashville logo

Nashville first qualified for WFTDA Playoffs in 2009, entering the WFTDA South Central Regional Tournament as the sixth seed and finishing in sixth place with a 126–66 loss to the Atlanta Rollergirls. In 2010, Nashville was the fifth seed at the South Central Regional, and came up against Atlanta again, this time in the third-place game, and won 132–73 to qualify for WFTDA Championships for the first time. At Championships in Chicago in November, Nashville lost to the Oly Rollers 214–53 in the opening round and was eliminated. At the 2011 South Central Regional, with a score of 213-38 Nashville again defeated Atlanta to finish in third place and qualify for Championships. At Championships, Nashville did not make it past the first round again, this time eliminated by Rocky Mountain Rollergirls by a score of 198–58. In 2012, Nashville was the fourth seed at the South Central Regional Playoff, but fell to a sixth-place finish after losing the fifth place game to No Coast Derby Girls 152–126.

In 2013, the WFTDA moved to a top-40 Division system for Playoffs, and Nashville qualified at the Division 1 level for the tournament in Asheville, North Carolina where they entered as the eighth seed and finished in eighth place after a 200–131 loss to Oklahoma Victory Dolls. At the 2014 Division 1 Playoff in Evansville, Indiana, Nashville was the eighth seed but moved up to a sixth-place finish, culminating with a narrow 183–180 loss to Arizona Roller Derby. In 2015, Nashville dropped into Division 2 Playoffs at Detroit as the top seed and won the tournament with a 194–189 victory over Sacred City Derby Girls, and also qualified for the Division 2 Championship in St. Paul, Minnesota. At Championships, Nashville rematched with Sacred City and fell 211-163 to finish in second place. Nashville returned to Division 2 Playoffs in 2016 at Wichita as the third seed, and finished in fourth place with a 132–118 loss to Jet City Rollergirls.

=== Rankings ===
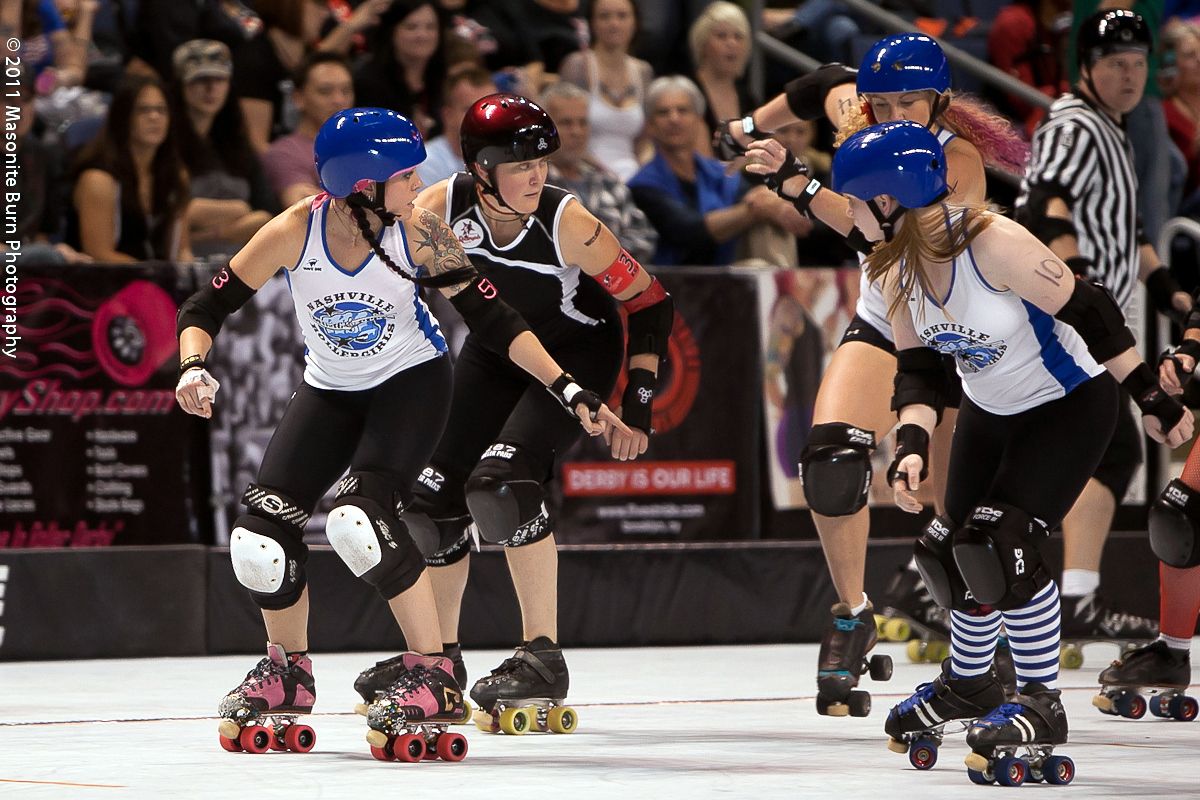
Nashville at the 2011 WFTDA Championships

Season	Final ranking	Playoffs	Championship
2008	11 SC	DNQ	DNQ
2009	6 SC	6 SC	DNQ
2010	3 SC	3 SC	R1
2011	3 SC	3 SC	R1
2012	6 SC	6 SC	DNQ
2013	39 WFTDA	8 D1	DNQ
2014	31 WFTDA	6 D1	DNQ
2015	39 WFTDA	1 D2	2 D2
2016	55 WFTDA	4 D2	DNQ
2017	159 WFTDA	DNQ	DNQ
2018	120 WFTDA	DNQ	DNQ
2023	31 WFTDA	DNQ	DNQ
