= Red Stick Roller Derby =

Roller derby league

- Metro area: Baton Rouge, LA
- Country: United States
- Founded: 2007
- Teams: All Stars (Sometimes known as "Diables Rouges") (A team), Capital Defenders (B team), Red Stick Rascals (Juniors)
- Track type(s): Flat
- Venue: Baton Rouge River Center
- Affiliations: WFTDA
- Website: redstickrollerderby.com

Red Stick Roller Derby (RSRD) is a women's flat track roller derby league based in Baton Rouge, Louisiana. Founded in 2007, the league currently consists of two teams which compete against teams from other leagues. Red Stick is a member of the Women's Flat Track Derby Association (WFTDA).

== History ==
The league was founded in July 2007, the second roller derby league in Louisiana after the Big Easy Rollergirls, and played its first bout in October 2008. Soon, the league was competing with teams from across the south.

Red Stick was accepted into the Women's Flat Track Derby Association Apprentice Program in July 2010, and became a full WFTDA member in December 2011.

RSRD is associated with a junior roller derby program, Red Stick Roller Derby Juniors. Their Red Stick Roller Derby Juniors "The Feral" compete in JRDA competitions.

== WFTDA rankings ==
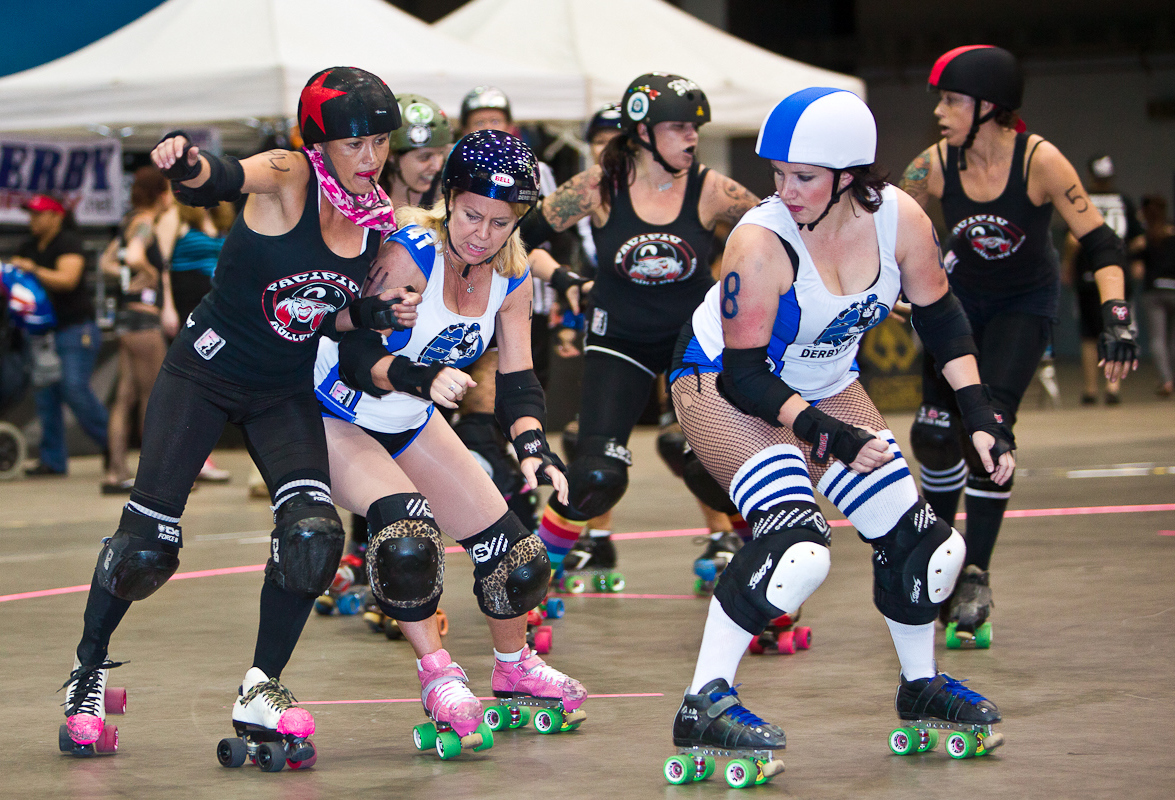
Pacific Roller Derby (in black) take on FoCo Girls Gone Derby at the 2011 Dust Devil tournament

Season	Final ranking	Playoffs	Championship
2012	33 SC	DNQ	DNQ
2013	117 WFTDA	DNQ	DNQ
2014	122 WFTDA	DNQ	DNQ
2015	112 WFTDA	DNQ	DNQ
2016	143 WFTDA	DNQ	DNQ
2017	109 WFTDA	DNQ	DNQ
