= Kansas City Roller Warriors =

Roller derby league

- Metro area: Kansas City, Kansas
- Country: United States
- Founded: 2004
- Teams: KCRW All-Stars (A team), Plan B (B team), Midtown Misfits, Strawberry Hellions, 18th and Vines, Kansas City Junior Roller Warriors, Black-Eye Susans (former home team), Dreadnought Dorothys (former home team), Knockouts (former home team), Victory Vixens (former home team)
- Track type: Flat
- Venue: Memorial Hall
- Affiliations: WFTDA, JRDA
- Org. type: LLC
- Website: http://kcrollerwarriors.com

The Kansas City Roller Warriors (KCRW) is a women's flat track roller derby league based in Kansas City, Kansas that was founded in 2004. The members of the league are split into four home teams that play within the league and two travel teams that represent KCRW in competition with other leagues. KCRW is a founding member of the Women's Flat Track Derby Association (WFTDA), and the Kansas City Roller Warriors All Star travel team was the winner of the 2007 WFTDA Championships, the "Texas Shootout", which took place in Austin, Texas.

== History ==
KCRW was founded in 2004 by Brooke Leavitt and Mandy Durham, who worked together as librarians. Inspired by the Texas Rollergirls, the KCRW LLC was solidified by June 2004. That summer, the two and a group of other women began practicing in a parking lot, forming the first practice of the Kansas City Roller Warriors. John Hernandez, a friend of the founders from college, became the team's first coach and the small contingent of team members distributed hand fliers to promote women to try out for the team. By the fall of 2004 the team was practicing at a local community center, on a basketball court.

Since its formation, the group consists of more than 80 players and three at-home teams: the Midtown Misfits, the Strawberry Hellions, and the 18th and Vines. KCRW originally held their bouts at the Winnwood Skate Center and Hale Arena in Kansas City before moving to the Kansas City Municipal Auditorium, where they skated through 2015. KCRW now plays home games and practices at Memorial Hall (Kansas City, Kansas) in Kansas City, Kansas. Approximately 30 people provide volunteer assistance for each at-home event, including referees, announcers, score keepers and other support staff.

== Teams ==
The league has three home teams: the Midtown Misfits, the Strawberry Hellions, and the 18th and Vines. The three home teams were introduced for KCRW's 2022-2023 mini home team season. KCRW's original home teams, the Black Eye Susans, the Dreadnought Dorothys, the Knockouts and the Victory Vixens, were retired following the COVID-19 pandemic.

The new home town teams reflect KCRW's commitment to creating an inclusive roller derby environment for all athletes. The teams' names also tie in KCRW's hometown pride as Kansas City's premier flat track roller derby league. The teams are named after Kansas City's Midtown and Strawberry Hill neighborhoods and historic jazz district, 18th & Vine.

The Roller Warriors held their first official season from January through June 2005 at Winnwood Skate Center. The founding season for KCRW drew 800 attendees. Through 2016, average bout attendance has been 2,000.

== Travel teams ==
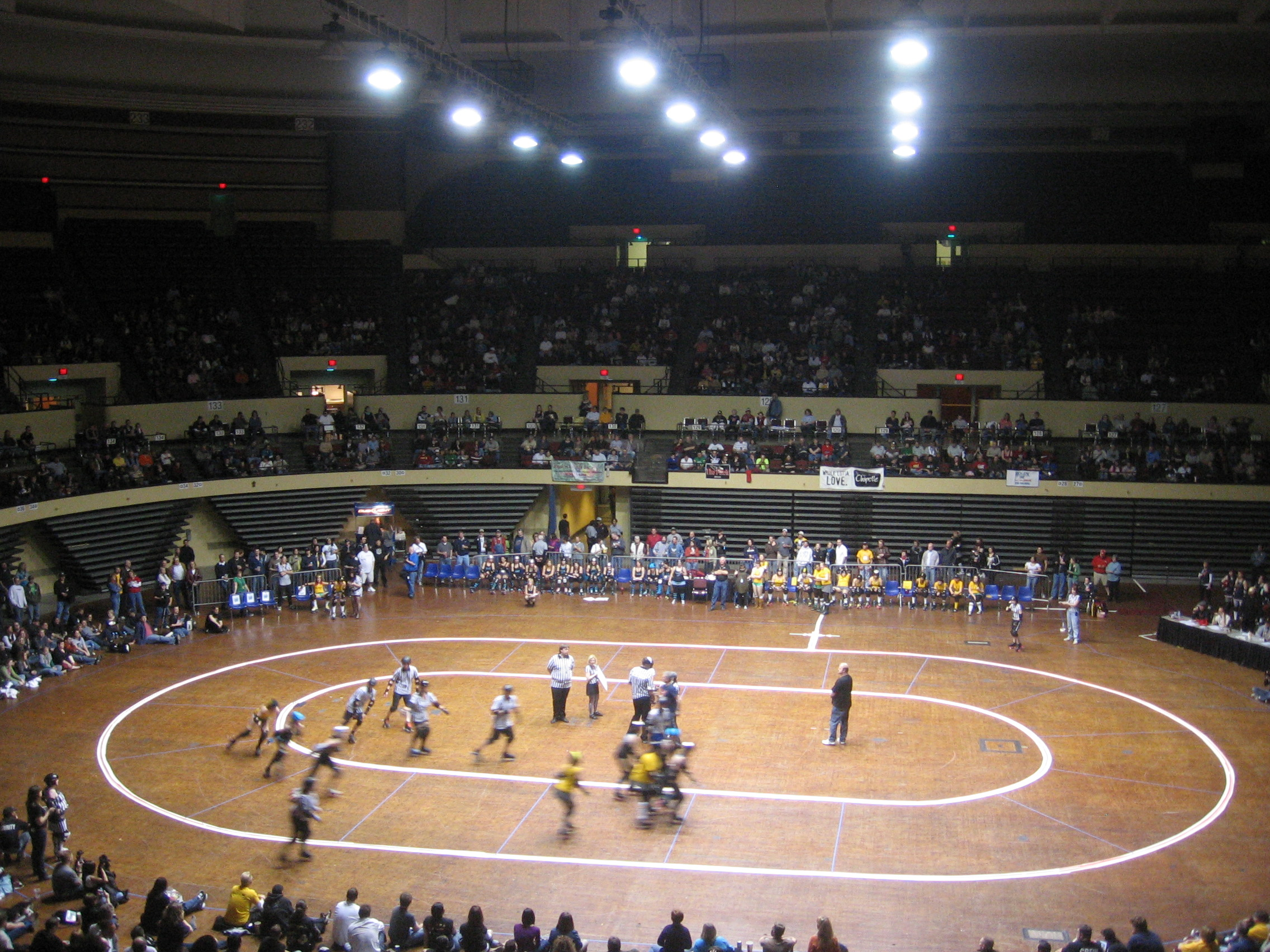
A Kansas City Roller Warriors bout in 2009.

The All Star team, founded in 2005, is composed of members of the four home teams of the Kansas City Roller Warriors. They compete at a national and international level. In 2007, the KCRW All Stars won the Women's Flat Track Derby Association Championships against the Rat City Rollergirls. The All Stars won the 2010 WFTDA South Central Regional Tournament and the league hosted the WFTDA 2011 South Central Regional Tournament. The All Stars placed first in the 2015 WFTDA International Division 2 Tournament held in Cleveland, Ohio.

Plan B is KCRW's second travel team, with members from all home teams who travel regionally. The team made its debut in 2011.

== Junior derby ==
In 2010, Ami Geddon and Bomb Pop, both Kansas City Roller Warrior's, worked to grow a junior roller derby league in Kansas City. They recruited other skaters with experience in coaching and teaching children. Along with Ami Geddon and Bomb Pop, Connie Magic, Jade Lightning, PDQ, Maiden Hell, Damsel of D'tension and Murphy's Law were the team's first coaches. After the first year Ami Geddon left the league and Bomb pop took over until 2014. They had two older teams and two younger teams, plus a travel team. The two teams names were Rolling Thunder (purple) and Starry Fright (green), The travel team was red.

Madam McBomb took on the head coach role in 2014, at the time there were 16 active skaters. The following year the number of skaters grew to 34 and by 2017 the league had 50 Junior skaters. In 2014, McBomb transitioned the Juniors program from a summer program to a year-round program. About 10 percent of the youth skaters go on to play for the adult league after turning 18. The league is open to youth skaters ages 8 –17.

== WFTDA competition ==
KCRW logo pre-2017

In February 2006, KCRW sent their All Star travel team to play in the first National WFTDA Championships in Tucson, Arizona. KCRW placed sixth in the nation out of twenty participating leagues. In 2007, Kansas City finished in fourth place at the first WFTDA Western Regional Tournament after a 111-62 loss to Texas Rollergirls. The KCRW All Stars returned to Championships, that year known as the "Texas Shootout", and defeated the Rat City Rollergirls for the title by a score of 89 to 85. All Star Xcelerator was awarded MVP for the tournament. In 2008, Kansas City was the top seed at the Western Regional but was upset in their opening game by Duke City Roller Derby, and ultimately finished in fifth place by defeating Pikes Peak Derby Dames 159-71.

Ahead of the 2009 season, the WFTDA adjusted its structure, and Kansas City was placed in the South Central Region. At that year's WFTDA South Central Regional Tournament, the KCRW All Stars finished in second place after a 150-73 loss to Texas. At that year's Championships, Kansas City lost their opening round match to Denver 175-89 and was eliminated. Kansas City took first place at the 2010 South Central Regional, defeating Texas 157-127. At the 2010 Championships, Kansas City lost in the quarterfinals 147-126 to Philly Roller Girls. At the 2011 South Central Regional, Kansas City finished in second place, losing the title game 132-92 to Texas. At Championships, Kansas City finished fourth, matching up again against Texas and losing the third-place game 136-122. Kansas City skater Kelley Young was named MVP for the tournament. In 2012, Kansas City took third place at the final South Central Regional with a 209-169 victory over Tampa Roller Derby. At Championships that year, Kansas City was eliminated in the opening round by Minnesota Rollergirls 244-168.

In 2013, the Women's Flat Track Derby Association replaced the geography-based regions with three competitive divisions. With their ranking at 21 on June 30, the KCRW All Star team qualified for the Division 1 playoffs, and competed in the tournament held in Richmond, Virginia, where they placed fifth by defeating Jacksonville RollerGirls 199-171. Kansas City finished in eighth place at the 2014 Sacramento Division 1 tournament, losing to Santa Cruz Derby Girls 171-122. The All Stars placed first at the 2015 WFTDA International Division 2 Playoff Tournament held in Cleveland, defeating Demolition City Roller Derby 171-142. Kansas City skater Bruz-Her was named MVP for the tournament. At the Division 2 Championships in St. Paul that year, Kansas City finished in fourth place, losing their rematch to Demolition City 149-139. At the 2016 Wichita Division 2 Playoff, Kansas City finished in eighth place after a 223-119 loss to Tucson Roller Derby.

=== Rankings ===
Season	Final ranking	Playoffs	Championship
2006	8 WFTDA	—	6
2007	1 WFTDA	4 W	1
2008	NR	5 W	DNQ
2009	2 SC	2 SC	R1
2010	1 SC	1 SC	QF
2011	2 SC	2 SC	4
2012	3 SC	3 SC	R1
2013	19 WFTDA	5 D1	DNQ
2014	48 WFTDA	8 D1	DNQ
2015	35 WFTDA	1 D2	4 D2
2016	65 WFTDA	8 D2	DNQ
2017	65 WFTDA	DNQ	DNQ
2018	100 WFTDA	DNQ	DNQ
2019	97 WFTDA	DNQ	DNQ
2023	19 WFTDA NA South Region	DNQ	DNQ
2024	18 WFTDA NA South Region	DNQ	DNQ
2025	13 WFTDA NA South Region	DNQ	DNQ

== Community work ==
A portion of the proceeds from the league's home bouts are donated to local charities including the Kansas City Police Activities/Athletic League, American Cancer Society, American Diabetes Association, Human Rights Campaign, the Rose Brooks Center, and many more. KCRW has partnered with the Mid America Chapter of the National Multiple Sclerosis Society.

== See also ==
- List of roller derby leagues

Preceded by Texas Rollergirls	WFTDA Championship winners 2007	Succeeded by Gotham Girls Roller Derby
Preceded by Texas Rollergirls	WFTDA South Central Regional Tournament winners 2010	Succeeded by Texas Rollergirls
