= Twister City Roller Derby =

Roller derby league

- Metro area: Oklahoma City, OK
- Country: United States
- Founded: 2006
- Teams: All Star Squad (A team); Tornado Alley (B team); Home Teams
- Track type: Flat
- Venue: Arctic Edge Arena
- Affiliations: WFTDA
- Org. type: 501(c)3 non-profit organization
- Website: twistercityderby.com

Twister City Roller Derby (TCRD) (formerly the Oklahoma Victory Dolls (OKVD) ) is a flat-track roller derby league based in Oklahoma City, Oklahoma. Founded in 2007, the league currently consists of two competitive teams which compete internationally against teams from other leagues, as well as home teams.

The current league is a result of two previous mergers: with the OKC Outlaws in 2015, and Oklahoma City Roller Derby in 2016. The league originally consisted of four home teams that competed against each other. Oklahoma Victory Dolls is a member of the Women's Flat Track Derby Association (WFTDA).

== History ==
As a 501(c)3 non-profit organization, Twister City donates a portion of their profits to local charities and have also organized fundraisers for injured skaters. They frequently volunteer for local charities and non-profits, and are regularly a part of local pride events.

In January 2017, the league announced it was merging with Oklahoma City Roller Derby and the new organization would continue under the Oklahoma Victory Dolls name.

In March 2020, OKVD, along with all other WFTDA-sanctioned leagues, took a hiatus from practice and gameplay due to the COVID-19 pandemic.

In June 2021, OKVD restarted practices, in compliance with the WFTDA return-to-play guidelines for sanctioned leagues. Intra-league gameplay remains on the horizon.

In January 2023, OKVD announced they were changing the name of the league to Twister City Roller Derby as a result of concerns over the connotations of the word "Dolls", with respect to both athletic seriousness and gender inclusivity.

=== Oklahoma City Roller Derby ===
OKCRD logo, 2006-2017

Oklahoma City Roller Derby (OKCRD) was founded by eight local women in March 2006 as the "Tornado Alley Rollergirls". More skaters joined in April, and the league grew rapidly. By the end of the year, the league already had four teams comprising a total of around 40 skaters, and was bouting regularly. However, in 2007, the majority of two of the teams left the league: most of the Cell Block 9 team founding the Red Dirt Rebellion banked track league, and most of the Victory Dolls forming the Oklahoma Victory Dolls league. In 2008, the league adopted the Oklahoma City Roller Derby name, with Tornado Alley Rollergirls becoming a team name. It was accepted into the Women's Flat Track Derby Association Apprentice Program in July 2010, and became a full member of the WFTDA in March 2011.

==== WFTDA rankings as OKCRD ====
Season	Final ranking	Playoffs	Championship
2011	27 SC	DNQ	DNQ
2012	28 SC	DNQ	DNQ
2013	100 WFTDA	DNQ	DNQ
2014	135 WFTDA	DNQ	DNQ
2015	110 WFTDA	DNQ	DNQ
2016	138 WFTDA	DNQ	DNQ

=== Oklahoma Victory Dolls ===
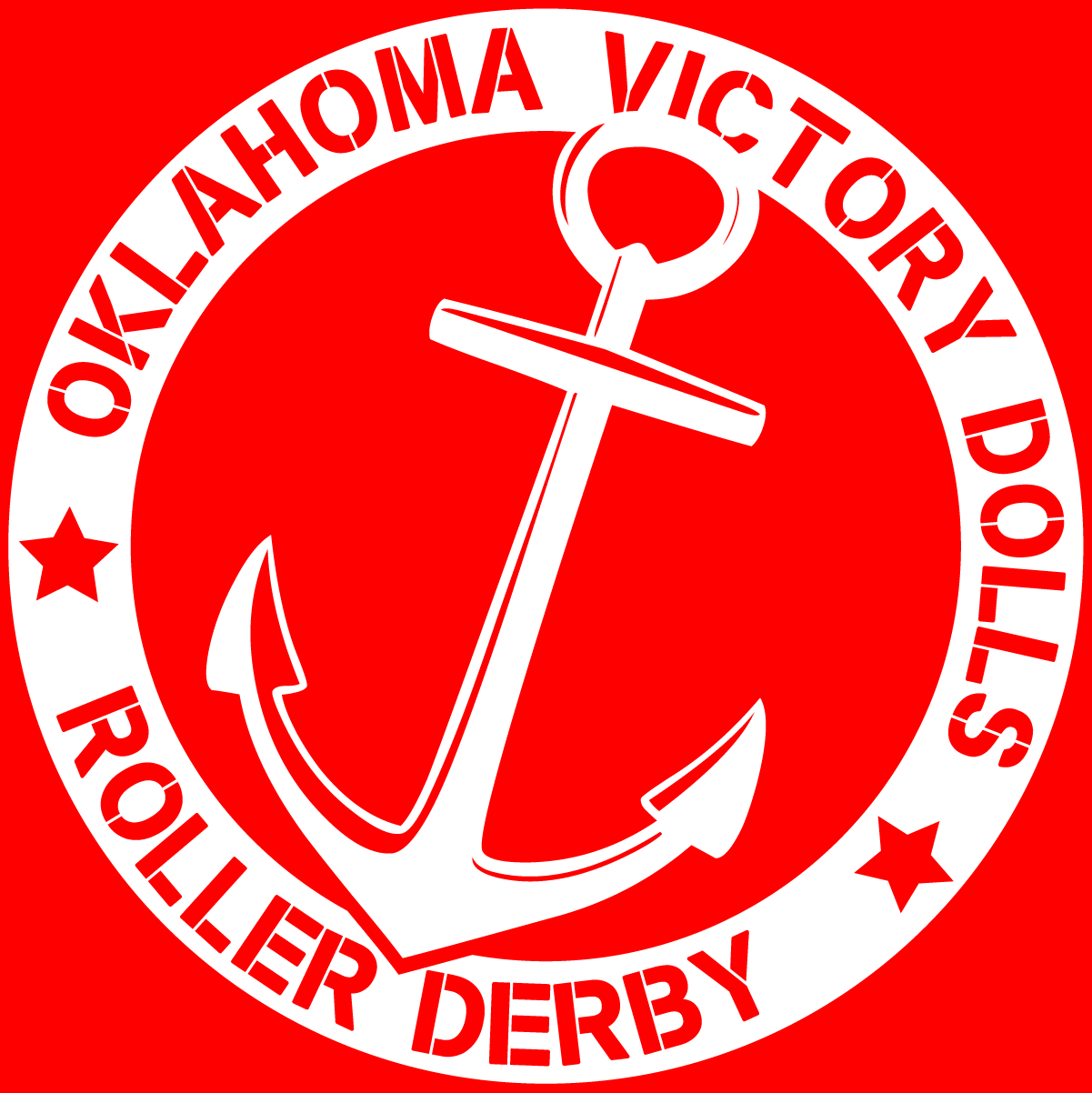
OKVD logo, 2008-2022

The Oklahoma Victory Dolls were the youngest league to be accepted as full members of the Women's Flat Track Derby Association (WFTDA) at the time of their induction in September 2008. They were a part of the South Central Region of the WFTDA from 2008 to 2012. When the WFTDA changed to a Divisions-based ranking system in 2013, the Oklahoma Victory Dolls debuted in Division 2, ranked at 55.

== WFTDA competition ==
In 2013, Oklahoma Victory Dolls first qualified for WFTDA Playoffs, entering the Division 1 tournament in Asheville, North Carolina as the ninth seed, and taking seventh place with a 200–131 victory over the Nashville Rollergirls. As the eighth seed in Salt Lake City in 2014, Oklahoma finished in tenth place with an overtime loss to Tri-City Roller Derby, 190–185. In 2015, Oklahoma City dropped into Division 2 Playoffs in Cleveland as the ninth seed and came out in eighth place after a 179–137 loss to Jet City Rollergirls of Everett, Washington. OKVD returned to Playoffs for the Division 2 Playoffs and Championship in 2017 as the fifth seed in Pittsburgh, and finished the weekend in seventh place.

=== Rankings ===
Season	Final ranking	Playoffs	Championship
2008	NR	DNQ	DNQ
2009	18 SC	DNQ	DNQ
2010	18 SC	DNQ	DNQ
2011	17 SC	DNQ	DNQ
2012	15 SC	DNQ	DNQ
2013	34 WFTDA	7 D1	DNQ
2014	32 WFTDA	10 D1	DNQ
2015	64 WFTDA	8 D2	DNQ
2016	64 WFTDA	DNQ	DNQ
2017	39 WFTDA	N/A	7 D2
2018	78 WFTDA	DNQ	DNQ
2019	76 WFTDA	DNQ	DNQ
2020	COVID	COVID	COVID
2021	COVID	COVID	COVID
