= Gainesville Roller Rebels =

Roller derby league

- Metro area: Gainesville, FL
- Country: United States
- Founded: 2007
- Teams: Allstars (A team); Swamp City Sirens; Millhopper Devils
- Track type(s): Flat
- Venue: MLK Center
- Affiliations: WFTDA
- Website: gainesvillerollerrebels.com

Gainesville Roller Rebels (GRR) is a women's flat track roller derby league based in Gainesville, Florida. Founded in 2007, the league consists of a home team and an all star team which competes against teams from other leagues. Gainesville is a member of the Women's Flat Track Derby Association (WFTDA).

== History ==
The league was founded in late 2007 by Catherine Seemann, known as "Ms. Rebel". She recruited skaters using a variety of methods, including flyering, posting on MySpace, and talking to friends.

By late 2009, the league was playing regularly to crowds of around 400 people, and beat the Tallahassee Rollergirls in an upset.

The league was accepted into the Women's Flat Track Derby Association Apprentice Program in January 2012, and it graduated to full membership in December 2012.

In March 2013, the league debuted in the Women's Flat Track Derby Association's rankings at 51, the highest entry by a previously unranked team and the first to debut within the top 100.

== WFTDA rankings ==
Season	Final ranking	Playoffs	Championship
2013	66 WFTDA	DNQ	DNQ
2014	210 WFTDA	DNQ	DNQ
2015	272 WFTDA	DNQ	DNQ
2016	223 WFTDA	DNQ	DNQ
