= Omaha Roller Derby =

Roller derby league

- Metro area: Omaha, Nebraska
- Country: United States
- Founded: 2006
- Teams: All Stars (A team), AAA (B team), OJRD Cadets (Juniors)
- Track type: Flat
- Venue: Ralston Arena
- Affiliations: WFTDA, JRDA
- Website: omaharollerderby.com

Omaha Roller Derby is a flat-track roller derby sports-league based in Omaha, Nebraska. Founded in 2006 as Omaha Rollergirls, the league is a member of the Women's Flat Track Derby Association (WFTDA).

== History and structure ==
Omaha Rollergirls was founded in January 2006 by Erica Tremblay with fourteen initial members, which had reached 30 by the following year. Initially holding home events at SkateDaze in Omaha, the league gained WFTDA membership in 2008. In 2011, The Omaha Rollergirls began leasing their own dedicated practice space called "The Bunker".

The league currently consists of two teams, the Omaha All-Stars and the B team, "AAA" ("Attendance, Attitude, and Ability"). The league at one time featured two home teams, which played each other locally, called Victoria's Secret Service and the Low Down Lucys. They have also run a junior roller derby league, Omaha Junior Roller Derby, since 2011. OJRD consists of two teams: Cadets and Commanders. The Cadets are JRDA level 1 and 2 skaters.

In 2019, to better represent the diversity of their members, the league changed from Omaha Rollergirls to Omaha Roller Derby.

== WFTDA competition ==
In 2010, Omaha qualified for the WFTDA North Central Regional Tournament for the first time, placing ninth in the tournament with a 169–122 victory over Arch Rival Roller Girls. In 2011, they were moved to the South Central Region, and qualified for the WFTDA South Central Regional Tournament at their first attempt, although they lost all their bouts to finish in tenth place. In 2012, Omaha was the eighth seed at the regional playoff, and finished in seventh place with a 132–118 victory over the Tallahassee RollerGirls.

In 2013, the WFTDA restructured its playoffs and Omaha qualified for the Division 2 Playoff in Des Moines, Iowa as the seventh seed, finishing in eighth place following a 212–189 loss to Duke City Roller Derby. Omaha returned to Division 2 Playoffs in 2014 in Duluth, Minnesota as the seventh seed, but finished in ninth place, winning their final game 184–138 over Tucson Roller Derby. Omaha missed Playoffs in 2015, but served as the host league for a Division 1 Playoff at the Ralston Arena in October of the year. Omaha Rollergirls did not qualify for the post-season in 2018, but served as the host league for the inaugural North America West Continental Cup in late August.

Season	Final ranking	Playoffs	Championship
2009	15 NC	DNQ	DNQ
2010	10 NC	9 NC	DNQ
2011	10 SC	10 SC	DNQ
2012	8 SC	7 SC	DNQ
2013	65 WFTDA	8 D2	DNQ
2014	66 WFTDA	9 D2	DNQ
2015	84 WFTDA	DNQ	DNQ
2016	74 WFTDA	DNQ	DNQ
2017	96 WFTDA	DNQ	DNQ
2018	146 WFTDA	DNQ	DNQ

== In the community ==
The Omaha Rollergirls appear at community events and raise funds for charity, including appearances at the "Polar Plunge" to raise money for the Special Olympics, Color-Run, putting on Poker Run's for area charities, Beer Olympics, playing at Septemberfest, Heartland Pride Festival, Community Day Sale, Relay for Life and other events and causes.

Omaha Rollergirls was the "Featured League" on the WFTDA website in March 2013, and was voted one of Omaha Magazine's "Best Sports Team" in 2015 and 2016.
