= Magnolia Roller Vixens =

Roller derby league

- Metro area: Jackson, MS
- Country: United States
- Founded: 2008
- Dissolved: 2016
- Teams: All Stars
- Track type(s): Flat
- Venue: Jackson Convention Center
- Affiliations: WFTDA
- Website: www.magnoliarollervixens.com

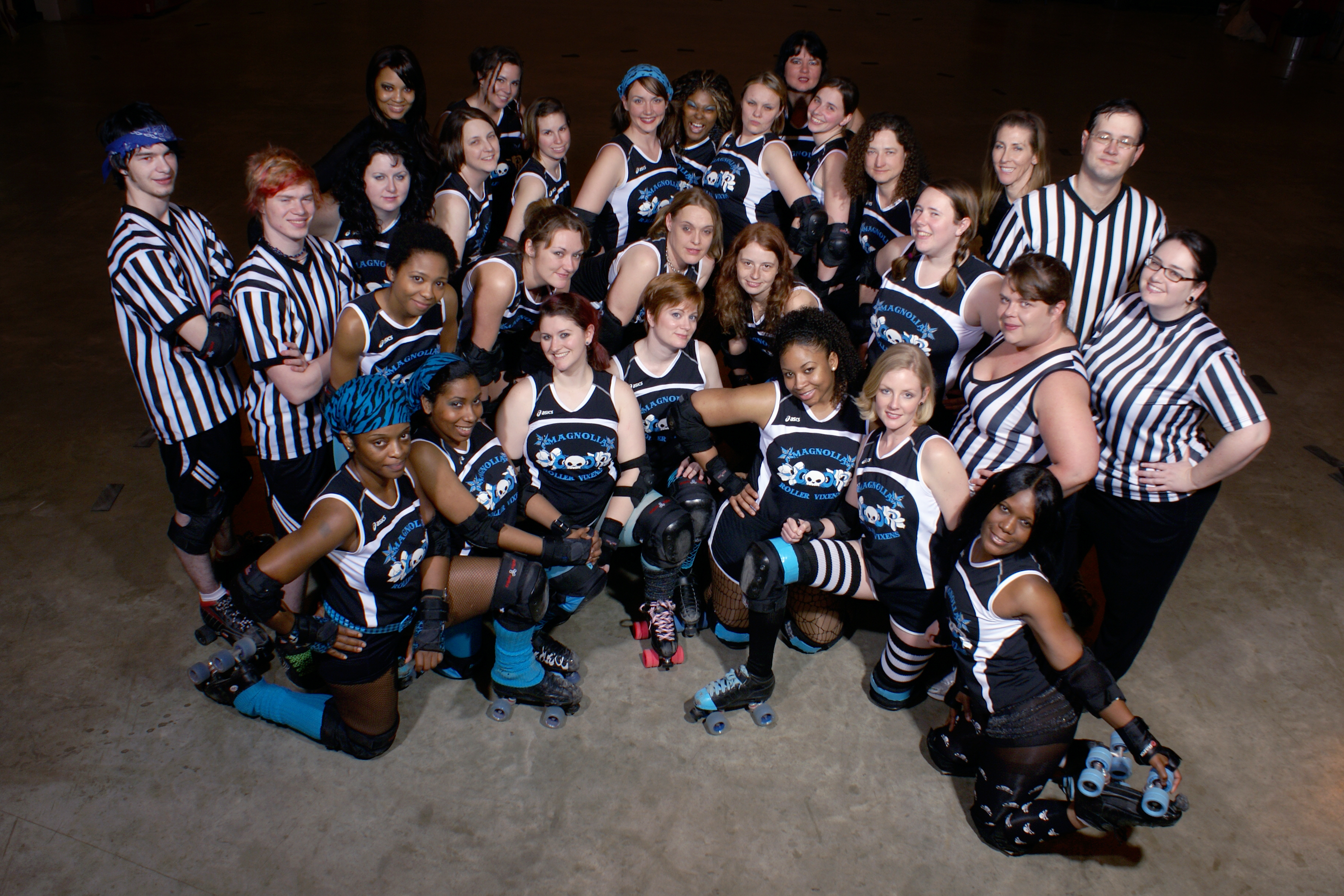
League members in 2010

Magnolia Roller Vixens (MRV) was a women's flat track roller derby league based in Jackson, Mississippi. Founded in 2008, the league consisted of a single team, which competed against teams from other leagues. Magnolia was a member of the Women's Flat Track Derby Association (WFTDA).

== History ==
The league was founded early in 2008, and held its first bout in November, in which its skaters faced players from Biloxi Roller Derby and Red Stick Roller Derby. By 2010, its practices were held at the National Guard Armory in Clinton, and its skaters were noted as having highly diverse careers.

In January 2011, the league was accepted as an apprentice member of the Women's Flat Track Derby Association, and it graduated to full membership in December 2012.

In July 2016, Magnolia Roller Vixens announced on its Facebook page that it was merging into Capital City Roller Girls, a non-WFTDA league based in Jackson, with the merged organization continuing under the Capital City name. The final appearance in the WFTDA Rankings by Magnolia was in the May 31, 2016 release, at 175th overall.

== WFTDA rankings ==
| Season | Final ranking | Playoffs | Championship |
|---|---|---|---|
| 2013 | 157 WFTDA | DNQ | DNQ |
| 2014 | 134 WFTDA | DNQ | DNQ |
| 2015 | 219 WFTDA | DNQ | DNQ |
