= Little City Roller Girls =

Roller derby league

Little City Roller Derby
- Metro area: Bristol, Tennessee
- Country: United States
- Founded: 2007
- Teams: All-Stars
- Track type: Flat
- Venue: Bristol Skateway
- Affiliations: WFTDA
- Website: www.littlecityrollerderby.com//

Little City Roller Derby (LCRD) is a non-profit 501(c)3 women's flat track roller derby league based in Johnson City, Tennessee. The league was founded in 2007 and competes against teams from other leagues. LCRD is a member of the Women's Flat Track Derby Association (WFTDA). The league describes itself as community-focused, striving to be a positive local influence through community outreach and charity donations.

== History and organization ==
Founded in August 2007, the LCRD had about twenty skaters by mid-2010. The league has close links with junior roller derby league, The Little City Junior Rollers (ages 11-17) and the Little City Derby Brats (ages 6-11).

LCRD was accepted into the Women's Flat Track Derby Association Apprentice Program in July 2010, and became a full member of the WFTDA in September 2011.

The Little City Roller Derby moved into their new home in 2019 at Bristol Skateway in Bristol, Tennessee.

== WFTDA rankings ==
Season	Final ranking	Playoffs	Championship
2012	30 SC	DNQ	DNQ
2013	148 WFTDA	DNQ	DNQ
2014	128 WFTDA	DNQ	DNQ
2015	231 WFTDA	DNQ	DNQ
2016	NR WFTDA	DNQ	DNQ
2017	309 WTFDA		
2018	225 WTFDA		
