= Tampa Roller Derby =

Roller derby league

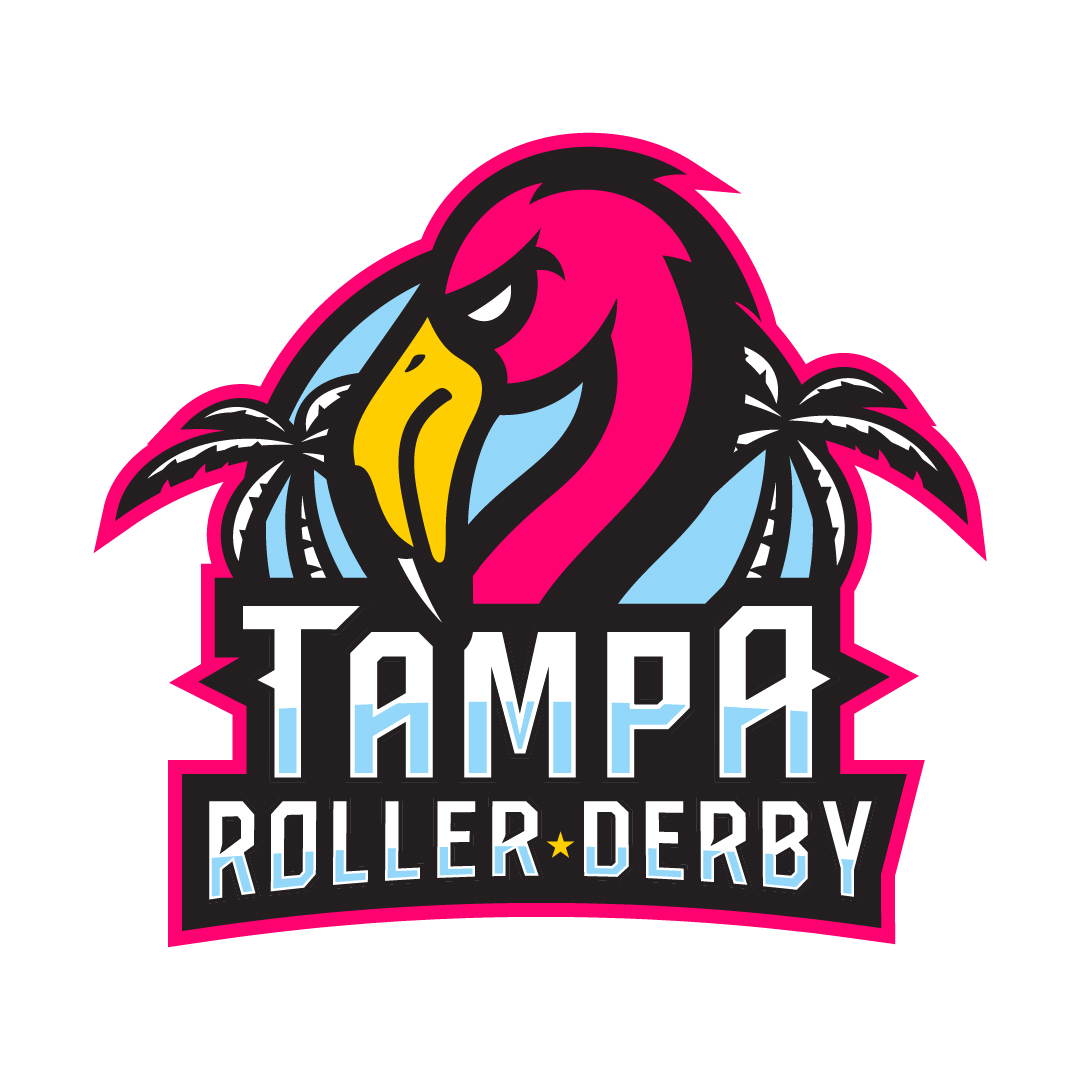
- Metro area: Tampa Bay Area
- Country: United States
- Founded: 2005
- Teams: Tampa Tantrums - Travel A Team; Bruise Crew - Travel B Team; Sea Sirens - Travel C Team; Death Rollers - Open Gender Travel Team; Black Widows; Cigar City Mafia; Switchblade Sisters; Tampa Bay Junior Derby
- Track type: Flat
- Affiliations: Women's Flat Track Derby Association
- Org. type: LLC
- Website: TampaRollerDerby.net

Tampa Roller Derby (TRD) is a flat track roller derby league based in the Tampa Bay Area. Founded in 2005, Tampa Roller Derby is a member of the Women's Flat Track Derby Association (WFTDA).

== History and league organization ==
Tampa Roller Derby was founded in 2005 as the Tampa Bay Derby Darlins by Angela "Dee Bauchery" Kroslak, and by later in the year a relationship began with the United Skates of America. The league was divided into 4 teams in 2006, the Black Widows, Cigar City Mafia, Switchblade Sisters, and Vicegrip Vixens. In May 2006 and all four teams participated in the first two bouts in TRD history, an event nicknamed "Project Mayhem". The first season culminated with the Black Widows winning the DD Championship Cup, by way of a completely undefeated season.

In 2007 Tampa Roller Derby became the first Florida league to be accepted into the Women's Flat Track Derby Association (WFTDA). In April 2008, Tampa played its first WFTDA-sanctioned bout, a 91–58 loss to the Atlanta Rollergirls. In 2009, the league was recognized by the Tampa Chamber of Commerce for the Florida State Championship 1st-place victory at the annual Sunshine Skate Championship. In 2010, TRD partnered with The Tampa Bay Sports Commission (TBSC) to host the first annual Franky Panky tournament. Former league member Little A was a member of Team USA at the 2011 Roller Derby World Cup.

Tampa Bay Derby Darlins officially became Tampa Roller Derby in 2012.

Tampa Roller Derby team logos

Tampa Roller Derby has four home teams, The Black Widows, Cigar City Mafia, Switch Blade Sisters and The Vicegrip Vixens, the latter of which was disbanded in the second season but revived for the 2015 season. Tampa Roller Derby also has three travel teams, including the all-star Tampa Tantrums. The Bruise Crew is the league's B-level travel team and plays other teams throughout Florida, as do the Sea Sirens, the league's C team. Tampa Roller Derby also has a junior roller derby counterpart, Tampa Bay Junior Derby, for girls and boys ages 8–17. The Aces on Eights is a pool of skaters where the home teams draw players to fill slots in their rosters.

Home events draw hundreds of fans and are held at USA SKATEWORLD in town and country.

== WFTDA competition ==
Tampa Roller Derby is a member of the Women's Flat Track Derby Association (WFTDA), joining in August 2007, and announced by the WFTDA in December 2007.

The Tampa Tantrums first qualified for WFTDA Playoffs in 2009, entering the WFTDA South Central Regional Tournament as the seventh seed and finishing in seventh place with a 127–110 victory over the No Coast Derby Girls of Lincoln, Nebraska. At the 2010 South Central Regional in Lincoln, Tampa was seeded sixth and finished in sixth, this time losing to No Coast 148–123. Tampa was again seeded sixth for the 2011 tournament, but slid down to a ninth-place finish, defeating Omaha Rollergirls 176–73 in their final game of the weekend. 2012 delivered Tampa's best result at South Central Regionals as they finished in fourth place, losing the third place game 209–168 to Kansas City Roller Warriors.

In 2013, the WFTDA moved to a top-40 Division system for Playoffs, and Tampa qualified at the Division 1 level for the tournament in Richmond, Virginia, where they entered as the seventh seed and finished in ninth place with a 283–133 victory over old rival No Coast. At the 2014 D1 tournament in Sacramento, Tampa was the seventh seed and clawed their way up to a fifth-place finish, beating Terminal City Roller Girls 181–156. Tampa held pace in 2015, entering the Jacksonville D1 tournament as the fifth seed and leaving in fifth, with a 220–80 win over Detroit. At Madison for Division 1 Playoffs in 2016, Tampa came their closest yet to a WFTDA Championships appearance, narrowly losing the third place game 149–131 to Arch Rival Roller Derby of St. Louis to finish in fourth place. In 2017, Tampa was the seventh seed at the Seattle Division 1 Playoff and won their opening game against Ann Arbor Derby Dimes 280–99, but then lost their quarterfinal to Angel City Derby Girls, 287–87. Tampa finished their weekend with a 222-150 consolation bracket victory over Windy City Rollers.

In 2018 the league declined invitation to the WFTDA Playoffs in A Coruña, Spain, citing the cost of air travel to the city.

=== Rankings ===
Season	Final ranking	Playoffs	Championship
2008	5 SC	DNQ	DNQ
2009	7 SC	7 SC	DNQ
2010	6 SC	6 SC	DNQ
2011	8 SC	9 SC	DNQ
2012	4 SC	4 SC	DNQ
2013	30 WFTDA	9 D1	DNQ
2014	19 WFTDA	5 D1	DNQ
2015	18 WFTDA	5 D1	DNQ
2016	16 WFTDA	4 D1	DNQ
2017	19 WFTDA	CR D1	DNQ
2018	26 WFTDA	DNP	DNQ

- CR = consolation round
- DNP = did not play

== In the community ==
Tampa Roller Derby perform community involvement activities, and have worked closely with organizations including The Springs Domestic Violence Center, Lowry Park Zoo, Habitat for Humanity, Ronald McDonald House, Arthritis Florida Foundation, Big Cat Rescue, and others. In October 2009, Tampa skaters provided the "bulls" for Runs With Bulls Tampa Bay, with proceeds going to Alpha House, which provides safe housing for pregnant women and their children.

On July 19, 2008, Tampa entered a large, flying skate in the Tampa Bay Red Bull Flugtag competition, and won the People's Choice Award at the event, scoring a third of the Red Bull Flugtag record 30,000 SMS votes.

TRD was contacted by producers of the movie Whip It, in order to gain permission for the use of the Black Widows team name for one of the Austin roller derby teams in the movie.

Then-TRD league president, Jessica Cameron (aka Anne Tagonize), was a finalist for Tampa Bay Business Journal’s 2010 Business Woman of the Year Awards. In September 2010, the Tampa Tantrums were featured in a music video for the Tampa punk band, Neglected Superhero. The song, "Derby Darlins," was written about and inspired by the Tampa Tantrums.
