= Jacksonville Roller Derby =

Women's flat track roller derby league

- Metro area: Jacksonville, Florida
- Country: United States
- Founded: 2006
- Teams: New Jax City Rollers (A team); River City Rat Pack (B team); J-Villains (C team); Bold City Bombshells; Duval Derby Dames; First Coast Fatales
- Track type: Flat
- Venue: Skate Station Funworks
- Affiliations: WFTDA
- Website: www.jacksonvillerollerderby.com

Jacksonville Roller Derby is a women's flat track roller derby league based in Jacksonville, Florida, (USA). Originally formed as the First Coast Fatales, the league became Jacksonville RollerGirls in 2007, and changed to its current name in 2018. The league has been a member of the Women's Flat Track Derby Association (WFTDA) since December 2010.

Jacksonville hosted a WFTDA Division 1 Playoff tournament in 2015, at which they finished in 2nd place.

== League structure ==
First organized in 2006, Jacksonville Roller Derby consists of six teams, 3 travel teams and 3 home teams. The teams play one another at home, and the teams travel to compete against other teams. All travel team skaters also compete on a home team while some skaters choose to play only on a home team. In 2014, the league began a structured training program designed to maximize each beginning skaters’ abilities toward passing the WFTDA minimum skills test as a requirement towards play in roller derby. New skaters are recruited three times per year and taken through a curriculum from basic skills to game play. A skater is allowed to repeat the program until they pass, if required.

The league welcomes referees, non-skating officials, and other volunteer staff to join the league at any time.

=== Travel teams ===
The league's top travel team, the all-star New Jax City Rollers, represents Jacksonville internationally as the WFTDA charter team. The team includes among its members Erin Jackson, a competitive inline speed skater, who won a silver medal for the United States at the 2015 Pan American Games. Jackson was tournament MVP at the 2014 WFTDA Division 1 Playoffs in Evansville, Indiana.

River City Rat Pack is the league's B-Team. They play other WFTDA league B-Teams as well as lower-ranked WFTDA charter teams and travel throughout the southeast. Many Rat Pack skaters are working their way up toward a position on New Jax and are invited to their practices to acclimate them to the higher level of play.

J-Villains are a C-Level Team and play primarily in Florida against local non-WFTDA teams. The J-Villains are usually a skater's first travel team after completing their training and, sometimes, are the first team to receive incoming transferring skaters until the next round of tryouts.

=== Home teams ===
The league's home teams are the Bold City Bombshells, Duval Derby Dames, and the First Coast Fatales. They play each other at home with their season culminating in a championship finale. In 2014, the inaugural championship title went to the Bold City Bombshells. Skaters are drafted to a home team as part of their graduation from Fresh Meat and stay with that team until their retirement.

=== Community involvement ===
Jacksonville Roller Derby supports local charities and community organizations by making public appearances at local events, volunteering time, and donating money. During each home game, a local organization is invited to host a table to raise both money and awareness and a portion of the game's proceeds are donated on behalf of the league. In recent years, the league has partnered with The Arc Jacksonville for an annual Running of the Bulls 5k where the skaters serve as the bulls, chasing down and marking the runners.

== WFTDA competition ==
The all-star team, New Jax City Rollers, plays at the highest level of competition. Their rank has steadily climbed from 24th in 2013, 15th in 2014, to 8th in 2015.

For the first time in league history, the team ended their 2015 season at the WFTDA Championships tournament, earning their place with a 2nd-place finish at WFTDA Division 1 Playoffs at home in Jacksonville. In 2016, Jacksonville returned to WFTDA Championships after finishing 3rd at the 2016 Division 1 Playoff in Columbia, South Carolina. After winning their first game against Minnesota Rollergirls, Jacksonville lost to the eventual 3rd-place team, Victorian Roller Derby League, 231–98. As the third seed at the 2017 Seattle Division 1 Playoff, Jacksonville suffered a rankings upset in the quarterfinals to Rat City Rollergirls, 186–170, and finished their weekend with a consolation bracket victory over Charlottesville Derby Dames, 318–161.

As the third seed at the 2018 Playoff in Atlanta, Jacksonville finished in second place, losing the gold medal game 172–155 to Texas Rollergirls. At Championships in New Orleans, Jacksonville lost their opening round game to Angel City Derby 248–85, and then lost their consolation round game to Crime City Rollers, 173–160.

=== Rankings ===
Season	Final ranking	Playoffs	Championship
2010	NR	N/A	N/A
2011	11 SC	DNQ	DNQ
2012	9 SC	10 SC	DNQ
2013	24 WFTDA	6 D1	DNQ
2014	15 WFTDA	4 D1	DNQ
2015	8 WFTDA	2 D1	QF D1
2016	9 WFTDA	3 D1	QF D1
2017	12 WFTDA	CR D1	DNQ
2018	9 WFTDA	2	CR

- CR = consolation round

== Local television ==
Jacksonville Roller Derby previously had a television program which began airing weekly on CW17 September 25, 2010, with some games being available for viewing in their entirety online. The league is included in the station's promotional appearances as local celebrities.
