= Springfield Roller Derby =

Roller derby league

- Metro area: Springfield, MO
- Country: United States
- Founded: 2006
- Teams: All-Stars (A-team); Battle Broads (B-team)
- Track type(s): Flat
- Venue: Shrine Mosque
- Affiliations: WFTDA
- Website: springfieldrollerderby.com

Springfield Roller Derby is a women's flat-track roller derby league based in Springfield, Missouri. Founded in the fall of 2006, SRG was the first roller derby league in the Springfield area. The Springfield Roller Girls are members of the Women's Flat Track Derby Association (WFTDA).

Springfield Roller Derby is the Area's nationally ranked flat-track Roller Derby Team. It became a member of the Women's Flat Track Derby Association (WFTDA) in 2011.

== History and organization ==
Established as Springfield Roller Girls in the fall of 2006, the league is the area's first flat track roller derby league, owned and operated by the women who skate for it. Springfield is registered as a Limited liability company. Springfield joined the WFTDA Apprentice Program in April 2010, and became a full member league in June 2011.

Springfield Roller Derby currently have two competitive travel teams; the All Stars are the WFTDA charter team, comprising the league's most seasoned roller derby veterans. The Battle Broads are the league's B level travel team, composed primarily of rookie skaters who are gaining experience and improving their skills through game play.

The league announced a rebrand and name change as Springfield Roller Derby in July 2017.

== WFTDA rankings ==
Season	Final ranking	Playoffs	Championship
2011	25 SC	DNQ	DNQ
2012	19 SC	DNQ	DNQ
2013	110 WFTDA	DNQ	DNQ
2014	197 WFTDA	DNQ	DNQ
2015	209 WFTDA	DNQ	DNQ
2016	205 WFTDA	DNQ	DNQ
2017	314 WFTDA	DNQ	DNQ
2018	259 WFTDA	DNQ	DNQ
