= Red Dirt Rebellion Rollergirls =

Roller derby league

Red Dirt Rebellion Rollergirls was Oklahoma’s only all-female banked track roller derby league. It was founded in 2007 by two women, Emily "Suzi Uzi" Matthews and Donn "Smakety Ann" Cross, with previous flat track experience. Skaters from the league built the banked track featured in the movie Whip It starring Drew Barrymore and Elliot Page.

Red Dirt Rebellion played leagues from all over the country at the Cox Convention Center in Oklahoma City, drawing crowds from 600-2000 spectators. Skaters from Arizona, Texas, Florida and California traveled to play on Oklahoma City's banked track.

Red Dirt Rebellion competed in Battle On The Bank 2 June 20–21, 2009, in Austin Texas and Battle On The Bank 3 in San Diego June 25–27, 2010. In July 2010, however, the league experienced personnel complications and was sold to a former skater (Gaylene Ricketts) to start her own team and reformed as "Outwest Outlaws". The Outwest Outlaws traveled to Ft. Worth, Texas to play two exhibition bouts at a NASCAR event during the Texas Motor Speedway No Limits VIP party. Under new management, the league became the OKC Outlaws. Ricketts ended up selling the track to the team.

However, with the increased cost of storing and maintaining a banked track, the new management of the OKC Outlaws struggled to maintain their league financially. In 2015, the OKC Outlaws moved towards flat-track play after merging with the Oklahoma Victory Dolls, forming Oklahoma's largest derby league.
