= Rocket City Roller Derby =

Roller derby league

- Metro area: Huntsville, Alabama
- Country: United States
- Founded: December 2004
- Track type(s): Flat
- Venue: Insanity Complex / Skate Odyssey
- Affiliations: WFTDA
- Org. type: 501(c)(3) NPO
- Website: http://rocketcityderby.com/

Rocket City Roller Derby is a women's flat track roller derby league located in Huntsville, Alabama. Founded in December 2004 as Dixie Derby Girls, the league is a charter member of the Women's Flat Track Derby Association (WFTDA).

== History and organization ==
The Dixie Derby Girls were formed in 2004. In 2006, with two home teams, the Thrill Killers and the Red Hot Riots, the league started holding games at Roller Time. An All-Star team was formed to play teams from other leagues. The home teams were dissolved in 2008, and the league began using a pair of travel teams, with the A team being the WFTDA charter team. Also in 2008, the league moved its home events to the Von Braun Center. In 2010, the A and B teams adopted new names, the Raging Rockets and Rocket City Rollers respectively. Following the dissolution of a neighboring league, Rolling Arsenal of Derby, the Dixie Derby Girls partnered with the Rocket City Rebels, a local junior roller derby team, and now play combined events at Insanity Skate Complex in Madison, Alabama.

The League is governed by the Board of Directors, with most league decisions made by an executive committee. In 2020, the league rebranded as Rocket City Roller Derby, in part to acknowledge Huntsville's contributions to the Space Program.

== Community ==
The league operates as a 501(c)(3) non-profit organization, and partners with local charities for every home bout. In addition, the league and individual skaters participate in events to raise money and awareness for local charities. In the past, money has been raised for Habitat for Humanity, Harris Home for Children, Breaking Free Rescue Mission, American Heart Association, Hope Place, Life Cycles, The Boys and Girls Club, Thrive Alabama, A New Leash on Life, The American Red Cross, United Way, and Huntsville Friends of Rabbits.

== WFTDA rankings ==
Former Dixie Derby Girls logo

Season	Final ranking	Playoffs	Championship
2006	25 WFTDA	—	N/A
2007	33 WFTDA	DNQ	DNQ
2008	12 SC	DNQ	DNQ
2009	15 SC	DNQ	DNQ
2010	14 SC	DNQ	DNQ
2011	21 SC	DNQ	DNQ
2012	26 SC	DNQ	DNQ
2013	104 WFTDA	DNQ	DNQ
2014	202 WFTDA	DNQ	DNQ
2015	212 WFTDA	DNQ	DNQ
2016	185 WFTDA	DNQ	DNQ
2017	205 WFTDA	DNQ	DNQ
2018	186 WFTDA	DNQ	DNQ
