= Gold Coast Derby Grrls =

Roller derby league

- Metro area: Fort Lauderdale, FL
- Country: United States
- Founded: 2007
- Track type: Flat
- Venue: Palm Beach Skate Zone; War Memorial Auditorium
- Affiliations: WFTDA
- Website: www.goldcoastderbygrrls.com

The Gold Coast Derby Grrls (GCDG) is a roller derby league based in Broward County, Florida. Founded in 2007, the league currently consists of two teams which compete against teams from other leagues.

The league was founded as the Broward County Derby Grrls in August 2007, and played thirteen bouts in their first year. By 2008, they had organized their first tournament, and were described by The Bismarck Tribune as Florida's top team. By 2010, the league had more than 60 skaters and was divided into A and B teams.

The Derby Grrls became a full member of the Women's Flat Track Derby Association (WFTDA) in March 2011, and were rapidly ranked at number 13 in the South Central Region. By the end of the summer, they had risen to number nine, and were therefore eligible to play at the WFTDA South Central Playoffs, in which they took eighth place.

| Season | Q4 ranking | Regionals | Championship |
|---|---|---|---|
| 2011 | 9 | 8 | N/A |
