= Assassination City Roller Derby =

Roller derby league

- Metro area: Plano, TX
- Country: United States
- Founded: 2005
- Teams: Conspiracy; Deadly Kennedys; Lone Star Assassins; Bombshell Brigade; ¡Viva La Revolucion!
- Track type: Flat
- Venue: Thunderbird Roller Rink (Past venues: Fair Park Coliseum)
- Affiliations: WFTDA
- Website: acderby.com

Assassination City Roller Derby (ACRD) is a women's flat-track roller derby league based in Plano, Texas. Assassination City is a founding member of the Women's Flat Track Derby Association (WFTDA).

Founded in 2005, the league consists of four home teams and one travel team. The home teams compete against each other in league play during the official home season, which typically runs from February to September. The league's All-Star Skaters make up the travel team, called Conspiracy. This group of skaters competes at the interleague level, against teams from other leagues and cities. The games or bouts played at this level affect the league's overall ranking among the top teams in the WFTDA.

ACRD has become active not only as competitors in the roller derby community, but as participants in the local community.

The 2011 season was moved to the Fair Park Coliseum, where it attracted 2,000 fans to its first bout. At the close of the 2013 season Assassination City returned to its roller rink roots at Broadway Skateland, where they played to a packed house and a sold-out crowd for the 2014 season opener, held February 8, 2014. February 2015 ushered the amateur sport into Plano, TX at Thunderbird Roller Rink where they still play & practice.

The league was voted on by the Plano community as the "Best Way to Get Your Heart Rate Up" in 2024

== Teams ==
All of the teams in ACRD have some sort of theme based around an aspect of the JFK Assassination which occurred in Dallas, Tx in 1963.

- Bombshell Brigade – themed after the Marylin Monroe "conspiracy"
  - Team colors are blue & red
  - 1. an overwhelming surprise "the news came as a bombshell" 2. INFORMAL a very attractive person "a twenty-year-old blonde bombshell" Pick your poison. When it comes to President John F. Kennedy and his assassination, there are plenty of bombshells to go around. Which is why the name was so fitting back in 2007 when Assassination City Roller Derby added a fourth team to their growing league – the Bombshell Brigade. Charmed and dangerous, the Bombshell Brigade is back after a brief hiatus. Don't worry, we brought both kinds of bombshells for your derby pleasure.
  - One of the original Home Teams which was disbanded in 2013 but returned in 2024 after fan vote/bout between restarting them or Ruby's Revenge
- Lone Star Assassins – themed after the Lee Harvey Oswald "conspiracy"
  - Team Colors – Black & Purple with silver accents
  - These lovely assassins are the "dark side of derby" and represent the Lee Harvey Oswald connection in the Kennedy Conspiracy. They never act alone. Skate to thrill, shoot to kill! Get ready to take a hit 'cause they've got you in their sights. Are they the culprits? The world may never know...at least, not in YOUR lifetime.
- The Deadly Kennedys – Named for the Kennedy family
  - Team Colors – Yellow & White/Grey
  - The Deadly Kennedys are the poison ivy league, half-breed descendants of the Kennedy clan. Nothing will stand in the way of avenging the untimely deaths of their Kennedy forefathers. Once and for all, they WILL end the family curse...
- ¡Viva La Revolución! – connected to the Cuban Missile Crisis
  - Team Colors – Red with white & yellow accents
  - New evidence has arisen that Lee Harvey Oswald volunteered to carry out the Kennedy assassination under direct orders from Cuba during a September 1963 visit to the Cuban embassy in Mexico City. Due to the fragile resolution of the Cuban Missile Crisis and the volatile relationships of the countries involved, this possible Conspiracy connection was swept under the rug, and this band of freedom fighters disappeared underground. But whispers have been heard that La Revolución has since resurfaced, and has been spotted secretly training for its resurgence.
- Conspiracy/Co-Conspiracy – Travel Team (A & B)
  - Team Colors – Grey/Red
- The Warren Commission – associated with the Warren Commission & its investigation
  - Referees & Non-Skating Officials who volunteer for the league are all a part of this team. Skating is fun and all, but we wouldn't be able to do it without these beautiful humans. Our referees make sure we stay safe by sending us to the box when we've been bad. We love them for it. Our non-skating-officials (NSOs) help our bouts run smoothly by working the scoreboard, penalty box & other behind the scenes tasks!

=== Previous Teams ===
- Ruby's Revenge – Connected to Jack Ruby
  - inaugural bout in 2012; disbanded in 2022 after low skater numbers due to the COVID-19 pandemic
- Special Ops – Original Travel A-Team
- Dirty Little Secret Service – Original Travel B-Team

== Rankings ==
=== WFTDA Rankings ===
Season	Final Ranking	Playoffs	Championship
2006	21	—	15
2007	26	DNQ	DNQ
2008	7 SC	DNQ	DNQ
2009	16 SC	DNQ	DNQ
2010	16 SC	DNQ	DNQ
2011	19 SC	DNQ	DNQ
2012	25 SC	DNQ	DNQ
2013	101 WFTDA	DNQ	DNQ
2014	163 WFTDA	DNQ	DNQ
2015	244 WFTDA	DNQ	DNQ
2016	135 WFTDA	DNQ	DNQ
2017	115 WFTDA	DNQ	DNQ
2018	125 WFTDA	DNQ	DNQ
2019	95 WFTDA	DNQ	DNQ
2020	79 WFTDA	Season Cancelled	Season Cancelled
2021	79 WFTDA	Season Cancelled	Season Cancelled
2022	79 WFTDA	No Sanctioned Play	No Sanctioned Play
2023	14 NA South	DNQ	DNQ
2024	17 NA South	DNQ	DNQ
2025	25 NA South	DNQ	DNQ

=== Home Team Rankings ===
Season	Champion	Season	Champion
2005		2006	
2007		2008	Bombshell Brigade
2009		2010	
2011	The Deadly Kennedys	2012	LSA vs BB
2013		2014	The Deadly Kennedys
2015	Lone Star Assassins	2016	Lone Star Assassins
2017	Lone Star Assassins	2018	Lone Star Assassins
2019	¡Viva La Revolución!	2020	Season Cancelled
2021	Season Cancelled	2022	¡Viva La Revolución!
2023	Lone Star Assassins	2024	The Deadly Kennedys
2025	The Deadly Kennedys	2026	
