= Texas Rollergirls =

Roller derby league

- Metro area: Austin, Texas
- Country: United States
- Founded: 2003
- Teams: Texecutioners (A team); Texas Chainsaws (B team); Hell Marys; Honky Tonk Heartbreakers; Hotrod Honeys; Hustlers
- Track type: Flat
- Venue: The Blood Shed
- Affiliations: WFTDA
- Org. type: LLC
- Website: http://www.texasrollergirls.org/

Texas Rollergirls is a women's flat track roller derby league based in Austin, Texas. Founded in early 2003 and widely credited as the league that started the modern roller derby movement, the Texas Rollergirls were the first flat-track league in the nation to play a version of roller derby using new standardized rules and a track design based on the dimensions of the old banked tracks. As flat-track derby caught on in other American cities, the Texas Rollergirls' rulebook and track design eventually evolved into the specifications that were adopted and ratified upon formation of the Women's Flat Track Derby Association (WFTDA) in 2005, of which Texas is a founding member.

The league consists of four home teams that play within the league and sometimes compete with member teams from other WFTDA leagues. The Texas Rollergirls all-star travel team, the Texecutioners, represents the league in WFTDA competitions and tournaments with other leagues. The Texas Rollergirls were the first winners of the WFTDA Championships in 2006.

== Early history ==
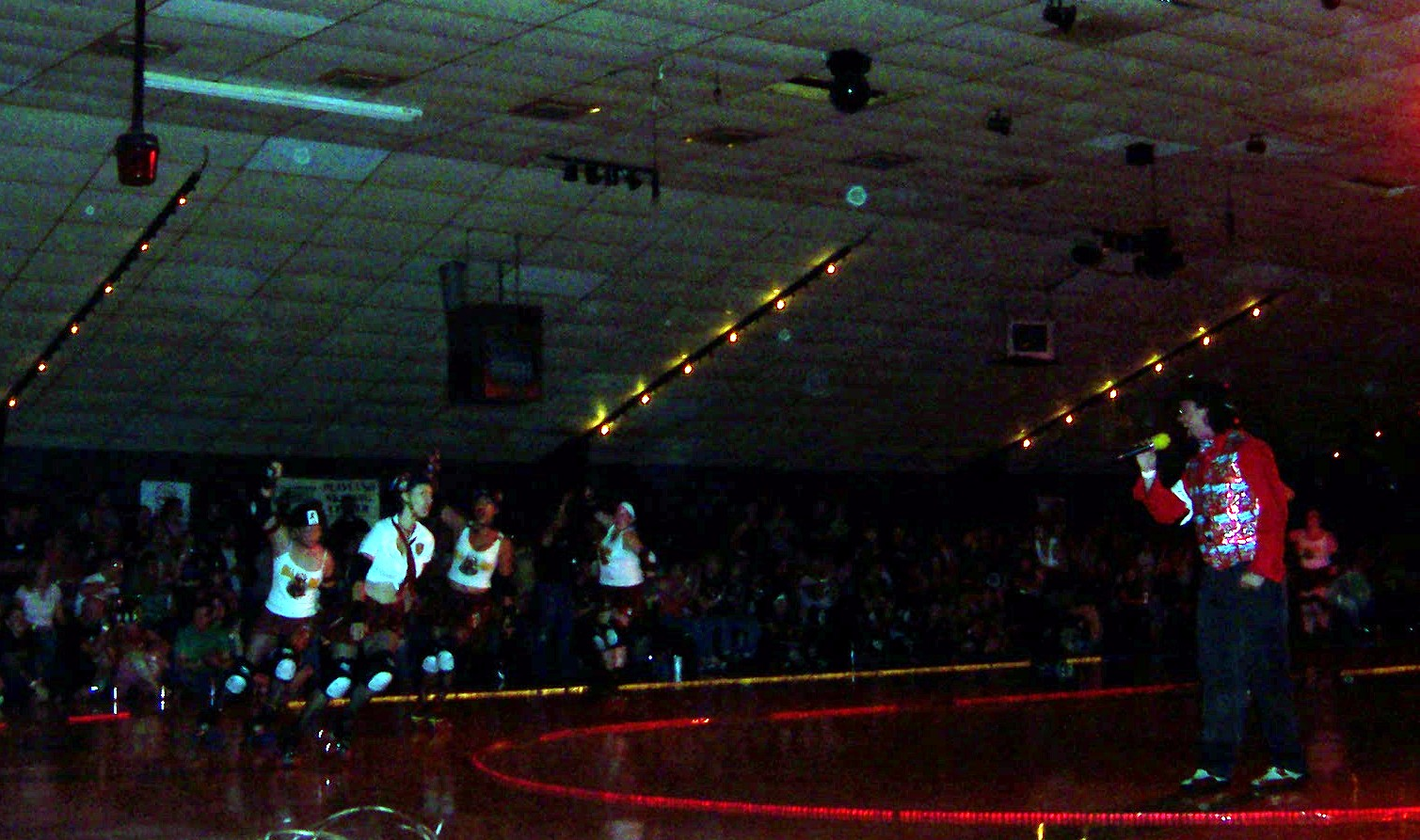
Texas Rollergirls in 2006

The founding skaters of the Texas Rollergirls were originally affiliated with an Austin, Texas, roller derby organization known as Bad Girl Good Woman Productions (BGGW), which formed after an aborted attempt by Daniel Eduardo "Devil Dan" Policarpo, an Austin-based musician, to start a modern roller derby-themed enterprise. BGGW formed as the first all-female roller derby organization.

The first public exhibition was held at Playland Skate Center in Austin on June 23, 2002, in front of 350 fans, with a follow-up event held in August before double the number of people. The final event of 2002 sold out at 1200 tickets, and hundreds of people had to be turned away. A March 2003 doubleheader at the Austin Music Hall during South by Southwest featured the band Nashville Pussy for entertainment.

By April, approximately 80% of the skaters left BGGW, taking three of the extant four teams with them, to form Texas Rollergirls Rock-n-Rollerderby, while the remaining skaters recruited new members to found the TXRD Lonestar Rollergirls. The nascent Texas Rollergirls announced their first bout in April 2003 at Playland Skate Center, and in July of that year surpassed attendance levels previously under the BGGW name.

The Texas Rollergirls continued to develop and play a flat track game that spread to other cities and became the basis of the game now fostered by WFTDA, while the Lonestar Rollergirls developed their own version of a roller derby game played on a banked track. The reasons and events leading up to the departure of the founding members of Texas Rollergirls are documented in the 2007 film Hell on Wheels.

In November 2004, Texas took part in the first true interleague games of the modern era, taking on Arizona Roller Derby and Tucson Roller Derby (Tucson and Arizona had a loose affiliation at the time). Texas defeated Tucson's Saddletramps 110-70.

In 2007, Texas hosted the second WFTDA Championships at the Austin Convention Center, at which they placed third, while the Kansas City Roller Warriors won.

== Influence on the derby revival and WFTDA ==
Texas Rollergirls, the first flat-track roller derby league, has had major influence on the evolution and growth of the sport. Texas is credited with directly inspiring the formation of WFTDA-founding member leagues in Chicago, Madison, and Minnesota, among countless others. The track and rules used by the WFTDA were originally defined by the Texas Rollergirls, and even the Hydra Trophy, awarded annually to the winner of the WFTDA Championships, is named after founding member (and the first WFTDA president) Jennifer "Hydra" Wilson.

== Teams ==
Former Texas logo

The home teams of the Texas Rollergirls are the Hell Marys, the Honky Tonk Heartbreakers, the Hotrod Honeys, and the Hustlers. The players also compete regionally and nationally as the Homies.

In 2007, Texas Rollergirls began supporting and training additional skaters who were interested in playing flat track derby more informally and recreationally. In addition to the main WFTDA league, the Texas Rollergirls Rec 'n' Rollerderby league consists of over 50 recreational skaters who compete with one another in informal flat-track games in Austin.

During 2018, the league announced it was renaming its travel B teams as the Texas Chainsaws.

== WFTDA competition ==
Texas Rollergirls, represented by the Texecutioners, won the first WFTDA Championships, the "Dust Devil" tournament, in 2006.

In 2007, the WFTDA began hosting regional playoffs to qualify for championships, and at the first WFTDA Western Regional Tournament, Texas came in third place with a 111-62 victory over the Kansas City Roller Warriors after losing to Rat City Rollergirls of Seattle. At the 2007 championships in Austin, Texas again was knocked to the third-place game by Rat City, and defeated Carolina Rollergirls 110-46 to claim third place. Texas won the 2008 Western Regional with a 135-49 victory against Bay Area.

At 2008's championships in Portland, Texas defeated Carolina in their first game, but then lost to Windy City Rollers of Chicago in the semifinals 110-97 (in overtime), dropping them to the third place bout, which they lost 114-95 to Philly Roller Girls to finish in fourth place.

Ahead of the 2009 season, the WFTDA adjusted its structure, and Texas was placed in the South Central Region. Texas won the first WFTDA South Central Regional Tournament with a 150-73 victory over Kansas City. At the 2009 championships in Philadelphia, Texas beat Boston and Rocky Mountain Rollergirls in the opening rounds, but then fell 178-100 to the Oly Rollers to finish in second place.

Texas came in second at the 2010 South Central Regionals in Lincoln, Nebraska following a 157-127 loss to Kansas City. Texas then won their opening game at Championships against Bay Area, but lost in the quarterfinals 151-52 to Gotham Girls Roller Derby to end their tournament.

In 2011, Texas gained revenge against Kansas City by beating them 132-92 to take first place at regionals in October. Championships that year brought yet another rematch against Kansas City in the third place game, which Texas won 136-112.

At the final South Central Regional in 2012, Texas opened with strong victories against Omaha and Tampa, and then defeated Atlanta 144-124 to win their second straight regional. For the second straight year, Texas also made the third place game at championships; however, this time they lost, 210-199 to Denver to finish fourth.

In 2013 the WFTDA restructured playoffs again, and under the new divisional model Texas qualified as a Division 1 team for the tournament in Richmond, Virginia, which they won with a 253-210 victory against Philly. Texas then returned to the championship game at championships for the first time since 2009, coming close but ultimately falling to Gotham 199-173. Texecutioner Bloody Mary was named tournament MVP.

At the Evansville D1 tournament in 2014, an upset loss to Windy City put Texas in the third-place game, which they won over Jacksonville Rollergirls 335-221 to finish in third. At championships in Milwaukee, Texas beat Angel City Derby Girls in their opening game but then lost in the quarterfinals to Gotham 163-117 to be eliminated.

At the 2015 Dallas D1 Playoff, Texas knocked off Philly in the semifinals and then fell to Rose City Rollers 257-223 to finish in second. After narrowly beating Minnesota Rollergirls in the opening round, Texas lost in the quarterfinals to Victoria 181-85 to end their run.

In 2016 Texas came close to upsetting London Rollergirls at Division 1 Playoffs in Montreal, ultimately falling 146-135 to finish second. At the 2016 championships, Texas knocked out Rat City in their first game but then lost their third-straight champs quarterfinal 186-172 to Rose City.

At the 2017 Division 1 tournament in Dallas, Texas won their quarterfinal against Dallas Derby Devils 248-89 and their semifinal against Arch Rival Roller Derby 209-119, but lost the final game to Victoria 193-50 to finish in second place. At the 2017 championships, Texas won their opening game against Rat City 254-128 but lost their quarterfinal to Gotham in a last-jam comeback 148-145. Texas finished their weekend with a consolation round win over Minnesota, 280-153.

In 2018, Texas was the top seed at the WFTDA Playoff in Atlanta and took first place with a 172-155 victory over Jacksonville; Texecutioner jammer Freight Train was named the tournament MVP. At Championships in New Orleans, Texas lost their quarterfinal to Gotham, and their consolation round game to Arch Rival.

In 2019, Texas earned the top seed at the International WFTDA Playoffs in Winston-Salem, North Carolina, defeating 2×4 Roller Derby 143-58 in the semifinal before losing the gold-medal game to Angel City Derby 120-73 to take second place. At the 2019 International WFTDA Championships in Montréal, Texas lost their opening game to Philly Roller Derby 136-114 and dropped to the consolation bracket.

WFTDA postseason tournaments were then placed on hold from 2020 through 2023 because of the COVID-19 pandemic.

Competition resumed in 2024 under a new WFTDA regional competitive system. Texas hosted the North America-South Regional Championships in Austin on June 28–30, 2024; seeded second, the Texecutioners lost the third-place game to the Red Stick All Stars 257-91 to finish fourth, with the New Jax City Rollers of Jacksonville taking the regional title.

=== Rankings ===
Season	Final ranking	Playoffs	Championship
2006	1 WFTDA	—	1
2007	3 WFTDA	3 W	3
2008	1 SC	1 W	4
2009	1 SC	1 SC	2
2010	2 SC	2 SC	QF
2011	1 SC	1 SC	3
2012	1 SC	1 SC	4
2013	3 WFTDA	1 D1	2 D1
2014	5 WFTDA	3 D1	QF D1
2015	5 WFTDA	2 D1	QF D1
2016	6 WFTDA	2 D1	QF D1
2017	7 WFTDA	2 D1	CR D1
2018	7 WFTDA	1	CR

- CR = consolation round

== In media ==
An August 2004 appearance on Good Morning America featured an interview with Whiskey L'Armour and members of the Texas Rollergirls demonstrating moves with host Robin Roberts, who donned skates for the segment. Founding member Melissa "Melicious" Joulwan wrote Rollergirl: Totally True Tales from the Track, published by Simon and Schuster in 2007, as a memoir and history of the early days of roller derby in Texas.

The Texas Rollergirls are featured in the 2012 Australian documentary film This Is Roller Derby. Photographer Felicia Graham published Rollergirls: The Story of Flat Track Derby in 2018, as a chronicle of the league's history and people.

Preceded by New tournament	WFTDA Championship winners 2006	Succeeded by Kansas City Roller Warriors
Preceded by Rat City Rollergirls	WFTDA Western Regional Tournament winners 2008	Succeeded by Oly Rollers
Preceded by New tournament	WFTDA South Central Regional Tournament winners 2009	Succeeded by Kansas City Roller Warriors
Preceded by Kansas City Roller Warriors	WFTDA South Central Regional Tournament winners 2011 and 2012	Succeeded by Tournaments restructured
