= No Coast Roller Derby =

Roller derby league

- Metro area: Lincoln, Nebraska
- Country: United States
- Founded: 2005
- Teams: Mad Maxines (A team), Road Warriors (B team), Furies (Juniors)
- Track type: Flat
- Venue: Ice Box (2015-Present) Pershing Center (2005-2014)
- Affiliations: WFTDA, JRDA
- Website: www.nocoastrollerderby.com

The No Coast Roller Derby is a co-ed flat track roller derby league based in Lincoln, Nebraska. Founded in 2005, the league currently consists of two mixed teams which compete against teams from other leagues. No Coast is a member of the Women's Flat Track Derby Association (WFTDA).

== League history ==
The league was founded after a Lincoln-based band toured to Austin, Texas, and got to know members of Texas Rollergirls. This inspired Jackie Geist and her friends to establish No Coast in Lincoln, the home of the National Museum of Roller Skating.

Roughly 350 fans attended No Coast's first exhibition bout in 2005, and the league played its first public bout in March 2006, attracting a crowd of around 2,000 fans. In May 2007, No Coast was announced as a new member of the Women's Flat Track Derby Association (WFTDA). Although the league initially had several of its own teams, these were later abolished, in order to focus on interleague play. As of 2016, No Coast fields two teams, the Mad Maxines (A team) and the Road Warriors (B team).

A JRDA-aligned program, the No Coast Junior Derby league, is run by No Coast. Their A team, the Furies, compete nationally.

From the league's formation until 2014, No Coast played its games at the Pershing Center, where they were used to drawing up to 2700 fans for events. Upon Pershing's closure in 2014, No Coast hosted at least one event that year at Pinnacle Bank Arena before moving to the Ice Box.

== WFTDA competition ==
In 2010, No Coast hosted the WFTDA South Central Regional Tournament at the Pershing Center, billed as the "biggest roller derby weekend in Lincoln history". No Coast themselves competed, entering the weekend as the eight seed and finishing in fifth place.

No Coast hosted the South Central Regional Tournament again in 2012, also at the Pershing Center. At the 2012 event, seventh-seed No Coast finished the weekend in fifth place with a victory over fourth-seeded Nashville Rollergirls.

No Coast has consistently qualified for WFTDA Playoffs every season since 2009. No Coast was the ninth seed at the WFTDA Division 2 Playoffs and Championship in 2017 in Pittsburgh, and finished in twelfth place.

=== Rankings ===
Season	Final ranking	Playoffs	Championship
2007	11 WFTDA	DNQ	DNQ
2008	3 SC	DNQ	DNQ
2009	8 SC	8 SC	DNQ
2010	5 SC	5 SC	DNQ
2011	6 SC	6 SC	DNQ
2012	5 SC	5 SC	DNQ
2013	27 WFTDA	10 D1	DNQ
2014	37 WFTDA	7 D1	DNQ
2015	27 WFTDA	6 D1	DNQ
2016	37 WFTDA	10 D1	DNQ
2017	43 WFTDA	N/A	12 D2
