= Big Easy Roller Derby =

Roller derby league

- Metro area: New Orleans
- Country: United States
- Founded: 2005
- Teams: AllStars (A team); Second Line (B team)
- Track type: Flat
- Venue: Human Performance Center
- Affiliations: WFTDA
- Org. type: LLC
- Website: https://www.bigeasyrollerderby.com/

Big Easy Roller Derby (est. 2005) is a women's flat-track roller derby league in New Orleans, Louisiana, United States. Big Easy is a founding member league of the Women's Flat Track Derby Association (WFTDA).

== History ==
Big Easy Roller Derby was founded as Big Easy Rollergirls in the spring of 2005 and had planned their first bout during Mardi Gras 2006. Unfortunately, the league was disrupted by and had to regroup following the events surrounding Hurricane Katrina, beginning competitive play on September 16, 2006. After a citywide tryout, BERD had two teams and more than 30 active members its first season. The debut bout was won by the Hor-Nots (v the 'Aints) 128–123 in overtime before a sellout crowd.

In their second season, Big Easy Roller Derby doubled their membership with new recruits and was able to field four local teams: Confederacy of Punches, Crescent Wenches, Marigny Antoinettes, and StoryVillains, as well as a travel team, the Big Easy Roller Derby Allstars. By the fourth season, Big Easy Roller Derby switched to a two-team structure: The Big Easy Allstars (A team) and the Crescent Wenches (B team). The Marigny Antoinettes are now the incoming year's "Fresh Meat", and the StoryVillains are the recreational team composed of retired Big Easy Roller Derby skaters.

The Big Easy Roller Derby organization has continued to grow and evolve, maintaining a rigorous athletic training regimen (both on skates and off) while regularly contributing to community-service–oriented efforts around New Orleans. Charities and organizations BERD has worked with include the Slaughter, Louisiana Volunteer Fire Department, Arabi Wrecking Krewe, New Orleans City Park, Sydney and Walda Besthoff Sculpture Garden, NO AIDS Task Force, Common Ground Collective, KaBOOM!, KIDsmART and the Louisiana SPCA.

Big Easy Roller Derby are a diverse group of female athletes, ranging in age from the twenty-one to over fifty. By day, they are dental hygienists, community college students, teachers, lawyers, stay-at-home-mothers, and waitresses.

For their first two seasons, home bouts were held at Blaine Kern's Mardi Gras World in Algiers, New Orleans. The league currently holds their home bouts before large crowds (400 - 600 attendees) at the University of New Orleans Human Performance Center.

Voted “Best Local Sports Team" by local magazine Where Y’at in their first season, the league's mission continues to be to encourage and empower women through the sport of flat-track roller derby. In doing so they provide alternative athletic entertainment while supporting charitable organizations that benefit the community at large.

In 2011, BERD converted from an LLC to a non-profit corporation, but does not have 501(c)(3) status. The league changed their name from Big Easy Rollergirls to Big Easy Roller Derby in 2019.

BERD has a partnership with Crescent City Crushers, the local junior roller derby league, to promote the sport locally.

== WFTDA competition ==
In October 2011, Big Easy were ranked number one by the Derby South organization, which represents leagues from five southern states.

After the 2013 season, they were ranked 93 in the world by the WFTDA. In 2014, Big Easy made their first appearance at WFTDA Division 2 Playoffs, coming into the Duluth tournament as the third seed, and ultimately finishing in fourth place.

=== Rankings ===
Season	Final ranking	Playoffs	Championship
2006	28 WFTDA	—	N/A
2007	30 WFTDA	DNQ	DNQ
2008	9 SC	DNQ	DNQ
2009	17 SC	DNQ	DNQ
2010	17 SC	DNQ	DNQ
2011	18 SC	DNQ	DNQ
2012	24 SC	DNQ	DNQ
2013	97 WFTDA	DNQ	DNQ
2014	67 WFTDA	4 D2	DNQ
2015	79 WFTDA	DNQ	DNQ
2016	142 WFTDA	DNQ	DNQ
2017	162 WFTDA	DNQ	DNQ

== Bibliography ==
- April 2008 - W Magazine - Bruce Weber spread on New Orleans features the Big Easy Rollergirls
- November 2007 - NOLA.com launches Flat Track Fever
- March 2007 - USA Rollersports Magazine "Frivolity in a Forgotten City"
- March 2007 - New Orleans Magazine "Easy Rollin'"
- Feb. 2007 - Times Picayune "Back to Basics"
- Dec. 2006 - Health & Fitness "Rolling Thunder"
- Nov. 2006 - UNO Driftwood "Roller Derby Action"
- Nov. 2006 - NolaFugees.com "Warriors of the Flat Rink"
- Oct. 2006 - Times Picayune "Rocking and Rolling"
- Oct. 2006 - Times Picayune "Rollergirls Make Algiers Their Rink"
- Oct. 2006 - The Gambit "A Sport for the Well-Wheeled"
- Sept. 2006 - The Gambit "Hot Picks"
- Sept. 2006 - New Orleans Magazine "People to Watch"
- Sept. 2006 - Tulane New Wave "Big Easy Rollergirls Ready for Prime Time"
- July 2006 - WTUL Community Gumbo "Through Hell and High Water""
- June 2006 - Where Y'at Magazine "Big Easy Rollergirls named 'Best local sports team'"
