= Atlanta Roller Derby =

Women's flat-track roller derby league based in Atlanta, Georgia, US

- Metro area: Atlanta, Georgia
- Country: United States
- Founded: 2004
- Teams: Dirty South Derby (A team); Rumble Bs (B team); Rolling Ruckus (C team); Apocalypstix; Black Water Reapers; Glamma Rays; Toxic Shocks
- Track type: Flat
- Venue: Golden Glide Skating Rink in Decatur, GA
- Affiliations: WFTDA
- Org. type: LLC
- Website: http://www.atlantarollerderby.com/

Atlanta Roller Derby (ARD) is a women's flat-track roller derby league based in Atlanta, Georgia. Founded in 2004, as Atlanta Rollergirls, the league finished their fourteenth season in November 2018. Atlanta Roller Derby is a founding member league of the Women's Flat Track Derby Association (WFTDA).

In November 2012, the Atlanta Rollergirls hosted the 2012 WFTDA Championships. In January 2019, the league announced its rebrand as Atlanta Roller Derby.

== Early history ==
In 2004 the Atlanta Roller Derby was started under the leadership of league founder Tanya Hyde (Angela Ward).

== Home teams ==
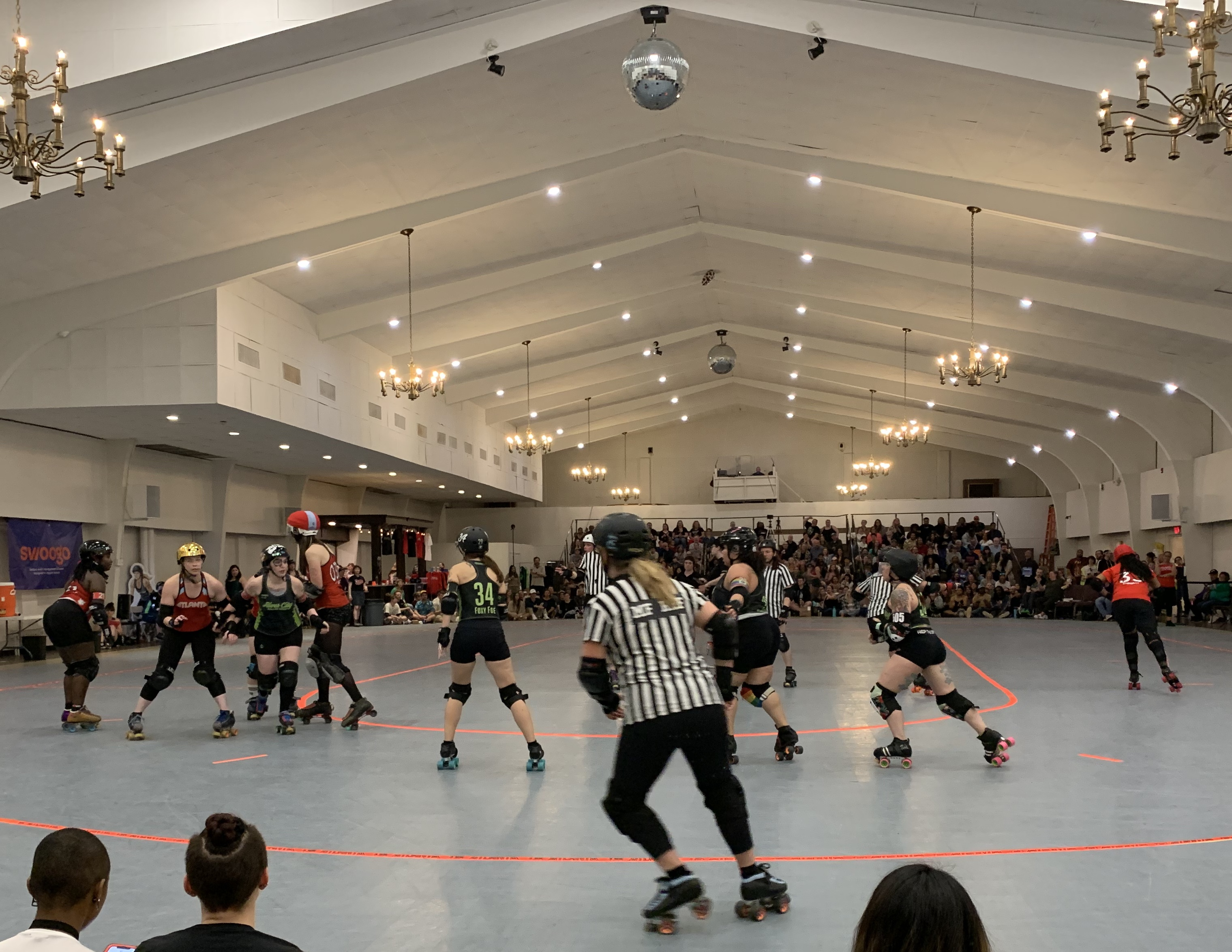
Atlanta Dirty South Derby plays the River City Roller Derby at the Yaarab Shrine in Midtown Atlanta on March 4, 2023.

The majority of ARD skaters compete on a “home team” only. Home teams practice monthly, and each skating member of the league must take part in the greater management of the league. Members of the Dirty South Derby Girls (DSDG) All-Star team have the option to not skate on a home team, but they must still participate in league management.

- The Apocalypstix.

Colors: Pink/Black

- The Denim Demons.

Colors: Blue/Red

- The Glamma Rays. - Formally the Sake Tuyas, the Glamma Rays rebranded in the 2018 season.

Colors: Red/White/Yellow

- The Toxic Shocks. - The Toxic Shocks were added as an expansion team in the 2007 season. The Shocks increased the total number of Atlanta Roller Derby home teams to four. The 2007 season was the first year the Shocks won the home team championship.

Colors: Green/Silver

=== League standings ===
Home team rankings are based on placement at the end of the season.

Season	Apocalypstix	Denim Demons	Sake Tuyas	Toxic Shocks	Glamma Rays	Black Water Reapers
2007	4th	3rd	2nd	1st		
2008	3rd	2nd	4th	1st		
2009	3rd	2nd	4th	1st		
2010	2nd	1st	4th	3rd		
2011	3rd	4th	1st	2nd		
2012	4th	1st	2nd	3rd		
2013	4th	1st	3rd	2nd		
2014	3rd	1st	4th	2nd		
2015	1st	3rd	2nd	4th		
2016	1st	4th	3rd	2nd		
2017	1st	2nd	3rd	4th		
2018	1st	2nd	3rd	4th		
2025	2nd	DNE	DNE	4th	3rd	1st
2026	TBD	DNE	DNE	TBD	TBD	TBD

== Travel teams ==
Atlanta Roller Derby fields three interleague teams that compete at a variety of levels: Baby Blue and Red are the official colors of all Atlanta Roller Derby interleague teams as of the 2014 season.

- The Dirty South Derby Girls All-Star Team – Atlanta's internationally ranked and sanctioned Women's Flat Track Derby Association All-Star travel team.
- The Rumble Bs - Atlanta's B-Team for exhibition and non-sanctioned games with other leagues. Composed of skaters from each of the home teams, the Rumble Bs serves as a training ground for All-Star skaters. The Rumble Bs travel is generally limited to areas in the Southeastern United States.
- The Jukes of Hazzard – Atlanta's C-Team, established in 2011 is composed of skaters from each of the four home teams. Active skaters who are neither on DSDG nor the Rumble Bs may put their names in for consideration for games. The Jukes of Hazzard have a rotating roster of members based on the game and team they will be playing. The Jukes of Hazzard compete in exhibition and non-sanctioned games.

== WFTDA competition ==
The Dirty South Derby Girls are Atlanta's all-star travel team, competes internationally within the WFTDA, and since its inception has qualified for either WFTDA Championships or Playoffs every year except 2008. Atlanta finished in fourth place at the WFTDA Division 1 Playoff tournaments in 2015, 2015 and 2016. In 2017, Atlanta finished out of the medal round, finishing with a 323-143 victory over Houston Roller Derby.

In 2018, Atlanta served as the host league for a WFTDA Playoff in September, in which they were themselves seeded fourth, and finished outside the top four in the consolation bracket.

=== Rankings ===
Season	Final ranking	Playoffs	Championship
2006	17	—	17
2007	20	R1	DNQ
2008	N/A	DNQ	DNQ
2009	5 SC	5 SC	DNQ
2010	4 SC	4 SC	DNQ
2011	4 SC	4 SC	DNQ
2012	2 SC	2 SC	R1
2013	10 WFTDA	2 D1	R2
2014	13 WFTDA	4 D1	DNQ
2015	14 WFTDA	4 D1	DNQ
2016	11 WFTDA	4 D1	DNQ
2017	15 WFTDA	CR D1	DNQ
2018	12 WFTDA	CR	DNQ
2019	22 WFTDA	CR	DNQ
2024	3 NA South	2 NA South	TBD

- CR = consolation round

== Atlanta Junior Roller Derby ==
ARD have a junior league who are members of the Junior Roller Derby Association and play by their ruleset.
