= WFTDA South Central Regional Tournament =

- 2009–2012

Tournament information
- Location: Various
- Month played: October
- Established: 2009
- Format: Knockout

Current champion
- Texas Rollergirls

The WFTDA South Central Regional Tournament or WFTDA South Central Region Playoffs was one of four annual roller derby regional qualifying tournaments for the WFTDA Championships.

The Tournament was organised by the Women's Flat Track Derby Association (WFTDA). Full WFTDA members in the South Central Region were eligible for ranking, and the top ten leagues would qualify for the South Central Regional Tournament, with the top three finalists qualifying for the Championships. Together, the four qualifying tournaments and Championships were termed the "Big 5". Starting with the 2013 WFTDA season, WFTDA's regions were discontinued in favor of an overall-rankings based system, and a new playoff format was created.

== Championships ==
Year	Date	Name	Venue	Champion	Second	Third
2009	25-27 September	Southern Fried Smackdown	Atlanta, Georgia	Texas Rollergirls	Kansas City Roller Warriors	Houston Roller Derby
2010	8-10 October	Amber Waves of Pain	Lincoln, Nebraska	Kansas City Roller Warriors	Texas Rollergirls	Nashville Rollergirls
2011	30 September-2 October	Show Me Der-B-Q	Kansas City, Missouri	Texas Rollergirls	Kansas City Roller Warriors	Nashville Rollergirls
2012	5-7 October	Landlocked Lace-up	Lincoln, Nebraska	Texas Rollergirls	Atlanta Rollergirls	Kansas City Roller Warriors

== 2009 Southern Fried Smackdown ==
On September 27, 2009, the Texas Rollergirls (Texecutioners) beat the Kansas City Roller Warriors 153–70 in the South Central championship bout. Houston Roller Derby (HaRD Knocks) defeated the Dallas Derby Devils 113–101 to take third place.
