= List of colleges and universities in New Jersey =

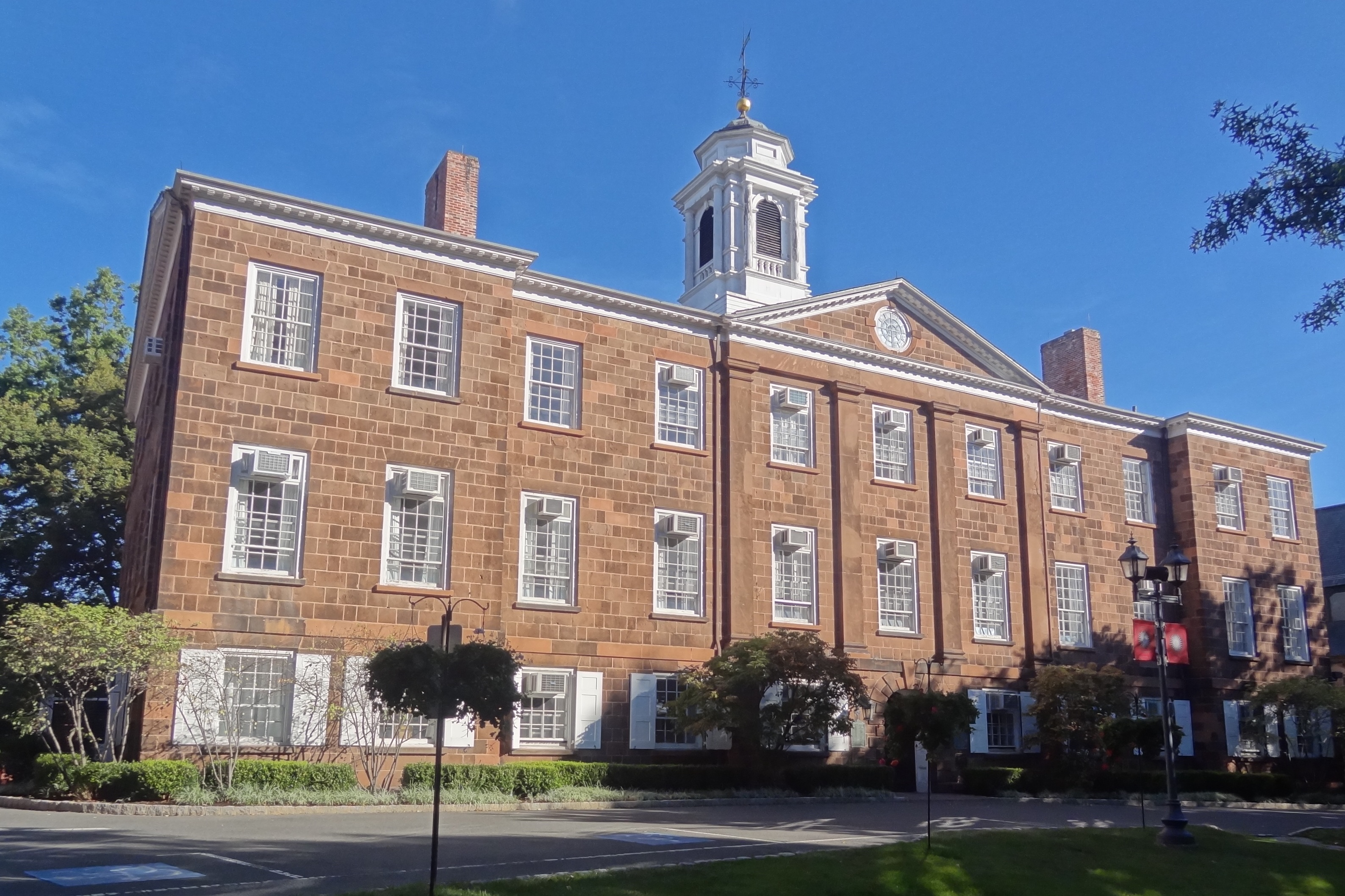
Old Queens, the oldest building at Rutgers University

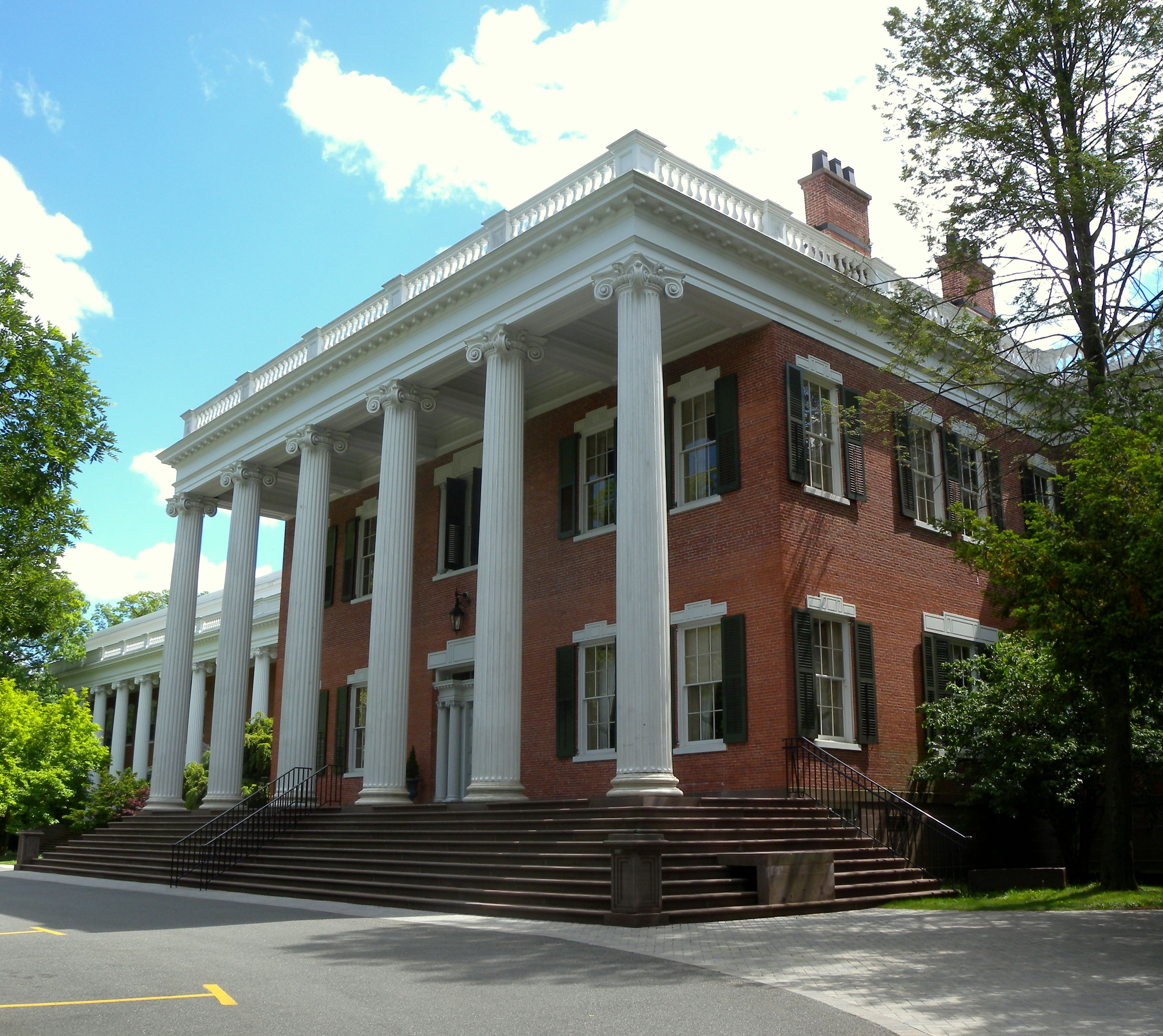
Mead Hall at Drew University

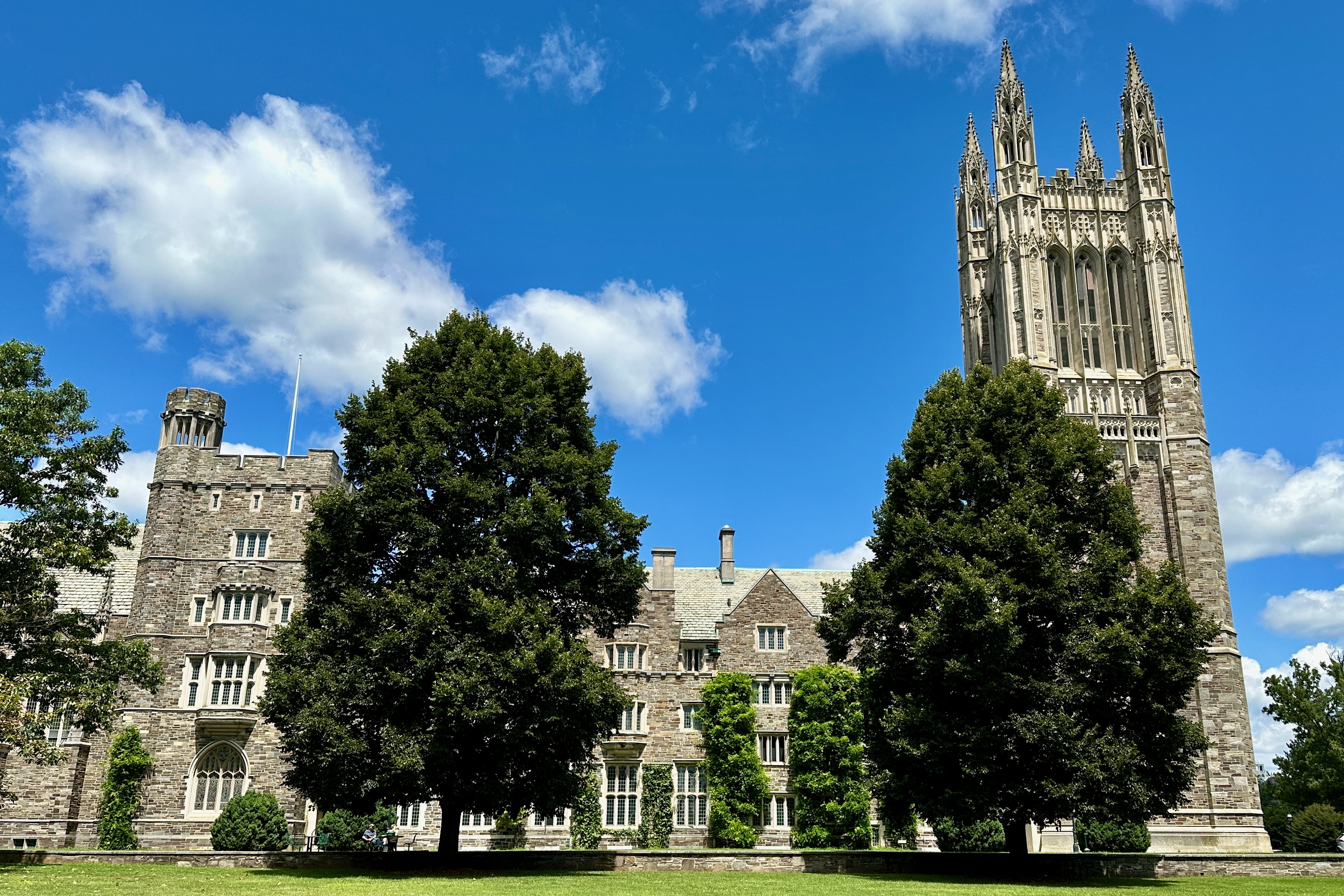
Graduate College at Princeton University

As of 2026, the State of New Jersey recognizes and licenses 96 institutions of higher education (post-secondary) through its Commission on Higher Education. These institutions include eight public research universities, six state colleges and universities, fifteen private four year colleges, nineteen community colleges, thirty one religious institutions (as "Talmudic Institutions/Theological Seminaries"), and fourteen for-profit proprietary schools (as "Proprietary Institutions With Degree-Granting Authority"), two graduate schools, and one two-year religious college.

As of February 2026, the United States Department of Education listed 156 New Jersey institutions in its database. This includes technical and vocational schools that offer only certificates or job training, as well as degree-granting colleges and universities.

New Jersey was the only British colony to permit the establishment of two colleges in the colonial period. Princeton University, chartered in 1746 as the College of New Jersey, and Rutgers, The State University of New Jersey, chartered on November 10, 1766, as Queen's College, were two of nine colleges founded before the American Revolution. In the 1860s, these two colleges competed to become the state's land grant college under the terms of the Morrill Act of 1862 which provided land and funding to expand development of engineering, scientific, agricultural, and military education at one school in each state. Rutgers received the designation in 1864 began to expand instruction in these areas and taking on a hybrid private-public role that paved the way for its transformation into a state university in 1945. Today, Rutgers is a large public research university serving over 65,000 students. Princeton remained a private college and developed into a research university that is one of the nation's eight prestigious Ivy League schools.

On August 22, 2012, then New Jersey governor Chris Christie signed into law the New Jersey Medical and Health Science Education Restructuring Act which divided the University of Medicine and Dentistry of New Jersey (UMDNJ) between Rutgers and Rowan University, creating two public medical schools. According to The Star-Ledger, the law gave Rutgers "nearly all of UMDNJ—including its medical schools in Newark and Piscataway—in one of the greatest expansions in the state university's history" and southern New Jersey's Rowan University would "take over UMDNJ's osteopathic medical school in Stratford."

There are three law schools in the state accredited by the American Bar Association; two at Rutgers (at the university's Rutgers–Newark and Rutgers–Camden campuses respectively) and the other at Seton Hall University's campus in Newark.

== Colleges and universities ==
Key
Abbreviation	Accrediting or approving agency
AARTS	Association of Advanced Rabbinical and Talmudic Schools
ATS	Association of Theological Schools in the United States and Canada
MSCHE	Middle States Commission on Higher Education
NJCHE	New Jersey Commission on Higher Education

=== Public colleges and universities ===
School	Location	Founded	Control	Type	Enrollment (Fall 2024)	Accrediting or approving agency
The College of New Jersey	Ewing Township	1855	Public	Master's	8,141	MSCHE
Kean Jersey City	Jersey City	1927	Public	Master's	5,429	MSCHE
Kean University	Union and Hillside	1855	Public	Doctoral/Professional Universities	13,905	MSCHE
Montclair State University	Montclair, Little Falls, and Bloomfield	1908	Public	Research university	23,375	MSCHE
New Jersey Institute of Technology	Newark	1881	Public	Research university	13,247	MSCHE
Ramapo College	Mahwah	1969	Public	Master's	5,981	MSCHE
Rowan University	Glassboro, Camden, and Stratford	1923	Public	Research university	21,026	MSCHE
Rutgers University (Note: Rutgers includes four campuses: the three traditional campuses of Rutgers-New Brunswick, Rutgers–Camden, and Rutgers–Newark; and a fourth "campus", Rutgers Health, a division oversees medical and health education at several locations statewide subsequent to the 2012–2013 merger between Rutgers and the University of Medicine and Dentistry of New Jersey (UMDNJ). Rutgers is a multi-campus university and not a university system.)	New Brunswick, Piscataway, Camden, and Newark	1766	Public	Research university	69,259	MSCHE
Stockton University	Galloway and Atlantic City	1969	Public	Master's	8,631	MSCHE
Thomas Edison State University	Trenton	1972	Public	Master's	7,544	MSCHE
William Paterson University	Wayne	1855	Public	Master's	9,942	MSCHE

=== Private 4-year colleges and universities ===
School	Location	Founded	Control	Type	Enrollment (Fall 2024)	Accrediting or approving agency
Caldwell University	Caldwell	1939	Private	Master's	2,005	MSCHE
Centenary University	Hackettstown, Long Valley, Parsippany, Edison, and Pleasantville	1867	Private	Master's	1,398	MSCHE
Drew University	Madison	1867	Private	Master's	2,232	MSCHE
Fairleigh Dickinson University	Madison, Florham Park, Teaneck, and Hackensack	1942	Private	Master's	10,930	MSCHE
Felician University	Lodi and Rutherford	1942	Private	Master's	2,427	MSCHE
Georgian Court University	Lakewood	1908	Private	Master's	2,013	MSCHE
Monmouth University	West Long Branch	1933	Private	Research university	4,767	MSCHE
Princeton University	Princeton	1746	Private	Research university	9,137	MSCHE
Rider University	Lawrence	1865	Private	Master's	4,003	MSCHE
Saint Elizabeth University	Morris Twp. and Florham Park	1899	Private	Master's	871	MSCHE
Saint Peter's University	Jersey City	1872	Private	Master's	3,572	MSCHE
Seton Hall University	South Orange, Newark, and Nutley	1856	Private	Research university	9,571	MSCHE
Stevens Institute of Technology	Hoboken	1870	Private	Research university	8,469	MSCHE

=== County community colleges ===
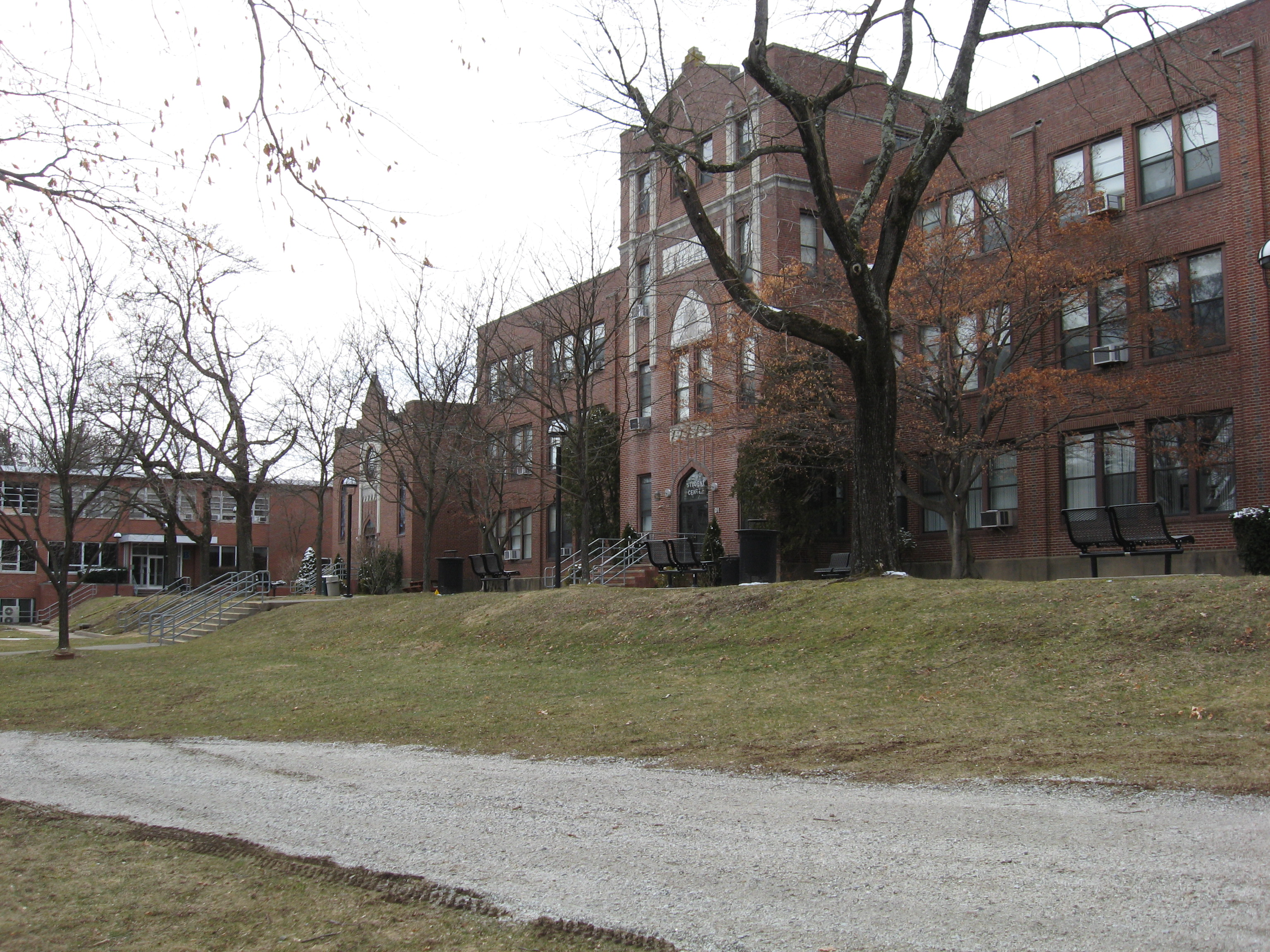
Sussex County's freeholders purchased Don Bosco College, a Roman Catholic seminary, for its community college campus in 1989.

New Jersey has a system of 18 public community colleges at the county level statewide. This reflects the fact that each college serves one of New Jersey's 21 counties, except for Atlantic Cape Community College, Rowan College of South Jersey, and Raritan Valley Community College, each of which serves two counties. In 2003, governor James McGreevey created the New Jersey Community Colleges Compact, through Executive Order No. 81, as a statewide partnership to enable cooperation between the colleges and various state departments. The compact is administered by the New Jersey Council of County Colleges, which makes recommendations on the deployment and use of county college resources in addition to providing educational and training materials to the college administrations to further their goals. The council was founded in 1989 under statute 18A:64A-26 of the New Jersey legislature to promote the advancement of the county community colleges of New Jersey.

Not all of the county colleges were founded by the State of New Jersey; the oldest county college in New Jersey, Union College (New Jersey), was founded in 1933 by the Federal Emergency Relief Administration as Union County Junior College; it operated as a private college from 1936 to 1982, and merged with the publicly operated Union County Technical Institute in 1982 to become the current public institution.

School	County served	Campus locations	Founded	Enrollment (fall 2024)	References	Main campus view
Atlantic Cape Community College	Atlantic; Cape May	Mays Landing and Cape May Court House	1964	4,052		Aerial view of Atlantic Cape Community College
Bergen Community College	Bergen	Paramus, Hackensack and Lyndhurst	1965	11,720		Aerial view of Bergen Community College
Brookdale Community College	Monmouth	Lincroft, Freehold Township, Wall Township, Neptune Township and Long Branch	1967	9,900		Aerial view of Brookdale Community College
Camden County College	Camden	Blackwood, Camden, and Cherry Hill	1967	7,622		Aerial view of Camden County College
County College of Morris	Morris	Randolph	1968	6,131		Aerial view of Morris' campus
Essex County College	Essex	Newark and West Caldwell	1966	7,026		Aerial view of Essex County College
Hudson County Community College	Hudson	Jersey City and Union City	1974	7,763		Aerial view of Hudson County Community College
Mercer County Community College	Mercer	West Windsor and Trenton	1966	6,394		Aerial view of Mercer County Community College
Middlesex College	Middlesex	Edison, New Brunswick, and Perth Amboy	1964	12,044		Aerial view of Middlesex County College
Ocean County College	Ocean	Toms River and Stafford Township	1964	7,095		Aerial view of Ocean County College
Passaic County Community College	Passaic	Passaic, Paterson, Wanaque, and Wayne	1971	4,782		Aerial view of Passaic County Community College
Raritan Valley Community College	Hunterdon; Somerset	Branchburg	1965	6,762		Aerial view of Raritan Valley Community College
Rowan College at Burlington County	Burlington	Mount Laurel	1966	6,620		Aerial view of Burlington County College Pemberton campus
Rowan College of South Jersey	Gloucester; Cumberland	Sewell and Vineland	1966	7,904		Aerial view of Gloucester County College
Salem Community College	Salem	Carneys Point Township	1958	1,135		Aerial view of Salem Community College
Sussex County Community College	Sussex	Newton	1981	2,247		Aerial view of Sussex County Community College
UCNJ Union College of Union County, NJ	Union	Cranford, Elizabeth, Scotch Plains and Plainfield	1933	8,330		Aerial view of Union County College
Warren County Community College	Warren	Washington	1981	944		Aerial view of Warren County Community College

=== Graduate-only institutions ===
School	Location	Founded	Control	Type	Enrollment	Accrediting or approving agency
Hackensack Meridian School of Medicine	Nutley	2015	Private	Special Focus	610	MSCHE, LCME

=== For-profit institutions ===
School	Location	Founded	Control	Type	Enrollment	Accrediting or approving agency
American Institute of Medical Sciences and Education	Piscataway	2004	Proprietary (for-profit)	Special focus	472	ABHES, MSA-CSS
Berkeley College	Newark, Woodland Park, Woodbridge, and New York City	1931	Proprietary (for-profit)	Master's	1,996	MSCHE
Best Care College	South Harrison	1997	Proprietary (for-profit)	Special focus	44	ACCSC
Chamberlain University	North Brunswick	1889	Proprietary (for-profit)	Special focus	1,226	HLC
CTOR Academy	Hoboken	2007	Proprietary (for-profit)	Special focus	-	CODA
DeVry University	Iselin	1931	Proprietary (for-profit)	Baccalaureate	67	HLC
Eastern International College	Jersey City and Belleville	1990	Proprietary (for-profit)	Special focus	495	MSCHE
Eastern School of Acupuncture and Traditional Medicine	Bloomfield	1997	Proprietary (for-profit)	Special Focus	42	ACAHM,
Eastwick College	Ramsey, Hackensack, Paterson, and Nutley	1985	Proprietary (for-profit)	Not classified	2,992	ACCSC
Jersey College (Note: formerly The Center for Allied Health and Nursing Education)	Teterboro, Ewing, Tampa, Jacksonville, and Fort Lauderdale	2003	Proprietary (for-profit)	Special focus	4,478	COE
Lincoln Technical Institute	Edison, Mahwah, Moorestown, Paramus, South Plainfield, Union	1947	Proprietary (for-profit)	Baccalaureate; Associate's	5,115	ACICS
Strayer University	Piscataway	1892	Proprietary (for-profit)	Master's	796	MSCHE

== Independent religious schools ==
=== Religious colleges ===
School	Location	Founded	Control	Type	Enrollment	Accrediting or approving agency
Assumption College for Sisters	Denville	1953	Private	Associates	30	MSCHE, NJCHE
Pillar College	Zarephath (Franklin Twp.) and Newark	1908	Private	Special focus institution	556	MSCHE

=== Christian theological seminaries ===
Theological schools are typically classified as "Special Topic Institutions" by the Carnegie Foundation.

School	Location	Founded	Affiliation	Accrediting or approving agency	Notes
New Brunswick Theological Seminary	New Brunswick	1784	Reformed Church in America	ATS, MSCHE	Oldest seminary in the United States; founded as Dutch Reformed seminary in New York City, moved to New Brunswick in 1810, run jointly and shared facilities with Queen's College, later Rutgers College, until 1856
Princeton Theological Seminary	Princeton	1812	Presbyterian Church (U.S.A.)	ATS, MSCHE	Second-oldest seminary in the United States and second largest theological library collection in the world behind only the Vatican Apostolic Library in Vatican City
Saint Sophia Ukrainian Orthodox Theological Seminary	South Bound Brook	1975	Ukrainian Orthodox Church of the USA	ATS	-

=== Talmudic schools ===
School	Location	Founded	Affiliation	Accrediting or approving agency	Notes
Bais Medrash Mayan Hatorah	Lakewood	2005	-	AIJS	-
Bais Medrash Toras Chesed	Lakewood	2000	-	AARTS	-
Bais Medrash Zichron Meir	Lakewood	2009	Yeshivish	AARTS	The official legal name, and former normal-use name is "Beth Medrash of Asbury Park." When the institution relocated in 2011, it changed its name.
Bet Midrash Ohel Torah	Lakewood	2016	Yeshivish	AIJS	-
Beth Medrash Govoha	Lakewood	1943	Haredi Orthodox Judaism	AARTS	-
Keser Torah-Mayan Hatalmud	Belmar	1993	-	AIJS	It is operated in the same location as the high-school-level "Mesivta Keser Torah."
Mosdos Yaakov V'Yisroel	Lakewood	2016	-	AIJS	-
Rabbi Jacob Joseph School	Edison and New York City	1982	-	AARTS	-
Rabbinical College of America	Morristown	1973	Chabad Lubavitch Chasidic	AARTS	Rabbinical college, also offers orthodox day school for boys and girls and summer programs
Rabbinical Seminary M'kor Chaim	Lakewood	1965	-	AIJS	-
Seminary Bnos Chaim	Lakewood	2013	-	AIJS	The seminary is the only Talmudical institution for women in New Jersey.
Talmudical Academy-New Jersey	Adelphia	1971	Yeshivish	AARTS	-
Yeshiva Bais Aharon	Lakewood	1996	-	AIJS	-
Yeshiva Chemdas Hatorah	Lakewood	2010	-	AIJS	-
Yeshiva Gedola Tiferes Yaakov Yitzchok	Lakewood	2017	-	AIJS	-
Yeshiva Gedola Tiferes Yerachmiel	Lakewood	-	-	AIJS	-
Yeshiva Gedolah Keren Hatorah	Lakewood	1997	-	AIJS	-
Yeshiva Gedolah of Cliffwood	Keyport	2004	-	AARTS	-
Yeshiva Gedolah Shaarei Shmuel	Lakewood	2008	-	AARTS	-
Yeshiva Gedolah Tiferes Boruch	North Plainfield	1989	Yeshivish	AIJS	-
Yeshiva Gedola Zichron Leyma	Linden	1998	-	AARTS	-
Yeshiva Ohr Zechariah	Lakewood	2005	-	AIJS	The formal legal name for the purposes of tax-filing and reporting to IPEDS is Yeshiva Gedolah of Woodlake Village.
Yeshiva Toras Chaim	Lakewood	1996	-	AARTS	-
Yeshiva Yesodei Hatorah	Lakewood	1995	-	AARTS	-
Yeshivas Be'er Yitzchok	Elizabeth	1999	-	AIJS	-
Yeshivas Emek Hatorah	Howell	2010	-	AIJS	-

== Defunct institutions ==
List of defunct institutions in New Jersey
School	Location	Control	Founded	Closed	Notes
Alma White College	Zarephath (Franklin Twp.)	-	1921	1978	-
Alphonsus College	-	-	-	1974	-
Bayonne Junior College	Bayonne	-	-	1951	-
College of South Jersey	Camden	-	1926	1950	Merged with Rutgers, the state university of New Jersey to become Rutgers University-Camden
Don Bosco College	Newton	-	1928	1990	Campus sold to County of Sussex to house Sussex County Community College
Englewood Cliffs College	Englewood Cliffs	-	1962	1974	-
Essex Junior College	-	-	-	1937	-
Evelyn College for Women	Princeton	-	1887	1897	-
Gibbs College	Livingston, Boston, Norwalk, Tysons Corner, and Cranston	-	1911	1997	-
Immaculate Conception Seminary	South Orange -	-	1861	1986	Now Immaculate Conception Seminary School of Theology, affiliated with Seton Hall University
ITT Technical Institute	-	-	-	2016	-
Jersey City Junior College	Jersey City -	-	1929	1959	Students transferred to Jersey City State College, now New Jersey City University
John Marshall College	-	-	-	1950	Merged into Seton Hall University as their law school
Law School of South Jersey	Camden	-	1920	1949	Became part of Rutgers, the state university of New Jersey
Luther College of Bible	Teaneck	Private, Lutheran-affiliated	1948	1978	-
Maryknoll Junior College	-	-	-	1954	-
Mother Savior Seminary	-	-	-	1961	-
Mount Saint Mary College	-	-	-	1970	-
Northeastern Bible College	Essex Fells -	-	1950	1990	-
Panzer College of Physical Education	Montclair -	-	-	1958	Merged with Montclair State College, now Montclair State University
Saint Gabriel's College	-	-	-	1968	-
Saint Joseph's College	-	-	-	1970	-
Saint Michael's Monastery	Union City -	-	1869	1984	-
Salesian College	-	-	-	1973	-
Shelton College	Cape May -	-	1907	1971	-
Tombrock College	-	-	1956	1976	-
Touro University College of Medicine	Hackensack		2007	2009	-
Trenton Junior College & School of Industrial Arts	-	-	1898	1967	Merged with Mercer County Community College
Union College	-	-	1933	1983	Merged with Union County Technical Institute to become Union County College
University of Medicine and Dentistry of New Jersey (UMDNJ)	New Brunswick, Newark, Camden, Stratford, Piscataway, and Scotch Plains	Public	1954	2013	Most of UMDNJ merged with Rutgers University in 2012–13; the School of Osteopathic Medicine 2013 merged with Rowan.
University of Newark	-	-	-	1947	Merged with Rutgers, the state university of New Jersey
Upsala College	East Orange and Wantage	Private, Lutheran-affiliated	1893	1995	Financial issues
Westminster Choir College	Princeton -	-	1926	1992	After financial problems, merged with Rider University, maintains name

== See also ==
- New Jersey County Colleges
- Higher education in New Jersey
- Higher education in the United States
- List of American institutions of higher education
- List of college athletic programs in New Jersey
- List of recognized higher education accreditation organizations
- List of colleges and universities
- List of colleges and universities by country
- New Jersey student loan program
