= Higher education in New Jersey =

A large number of higher education options are available in the State of New Jersey. Currently, 31 four-year colleges and universities are located in New Jersey. In addition, there are 18 county colleges offering two-year programs, serving the 21 counties in the state.

== History ==
=== Colonial colleges ===
Among the original thirteen American colonies, New Jersey is unique in that it was the only colony in which two colleges were established before the Declaration of Independence was promulgated in 1776. Of the nine colonial colleges, New Jersey possessed College of New Jersey, now called Princeton University, founded in 1746 and Queen's College, now known as Rutgers University (or officially as Rutgers, The State University of New Jersey), founded in 1766.

Princeton was established by the New Light Presbyterians.

Rutgers was established by clergy affiliated with the Dutch Reformed Church.

== State scholarship programs ==
To provide post-secondary education to a greater number of New Jersey students and keep high achieving high school students in the Garden State for college, New Jersey has established several scholarships. The New Jersey Higher Education Student Assistance Authority (NJHESAA) manages these programs. They include memorial scholarships, such as the Law Enforcement Officer Memorial Scholarship (for children of New Jersey law enforcement officers killed in the line of duty), and World Trade Center Scholarship Fund (for children of September 11th attack victims). The NJHESAA also coordinates the Edward J. Bloustein Distinguished Scholar program, the NJ STARS award program, and the NJCLASS student loan program.

=== Edward J. Bloustein Distinguished Scholar ===
Every year NJHESAA coordinates the Edward J. Bloustein Distinguished Scholar program. This award is granted to any New Jersey high school student who ranks in the top 10% of their graduating class at the end of their junior year. This top 10% must also graduate as the first, second, or third ranking student in the class or achieve at least a 1260 combined critical reading and math score on the Scholastic Aptitude Test. Each student receives $1,000 a year for the duration of their college career so long as they attend a college in New Jersey. Students can receive the scholarship for no more than five semesters at a two-year institution and no more than eight semesters at a four-year institution. The award is paid by NJHESAA directly to the institution in which the student is enrolled.

The award was established in the 1989–1990 academic year and posthumously honors Edward J. Bloustein, the seventeenth President of Rutgers University. The award was granted to more than 5,000 students in the 2006-2007 collegiate academic year.

=== NJ STARS ===
In 2004, then Governor Jim McGreevey created the New Jersey Student Tuition Assistance Reward Scholarship program (NJ STARS) to assist New Jersey high school students who go on to one of New Jersey's county colleges after graduation. Under this program, students who graduated in the top twenty percent of their high school class are provided with free tuition and fees at any New Jersey community college. The program covers up to five semesters of tuition as long as the student takes at least 12 credits each semester. Recipients must maintain a 3.0 grade point average through the first year to get the scholarship renewed for the second year.

The program was later expanded to include the NJ STARS II program. Any student who receives scholarship aid in the NJ STARS program at a county college can receive aid at a New Jersey 4-year college after graduation from the county college. The NJ STARS II program provides full tuition for the student at participating New Jersey colleges. The state provides $4,000 for tuition for the student and the college covers the rest of the balance. A student must also apply for federal aid to reduce what the colleges must provide.

== Colleges and universities ==
=== Public research universities ===
- Rutgers, the State University of New Jersey
  - Rutgers–New Brunswick, New Brunswick and Piscataway
  - Rutgers–Camden, Camden
  - Rutgers–Newark, Newark
  - Rutgers Health
- Montclair State University, Montclair
- New Jersey Institute of Technology, Newark
- Rowan University, Glassboro, Camden, and Stratford
  - School of Osteopathic Medicine
  - Cooper Medical School

=== State colleges and universities ===
- Bloomfield College, Bloomfield
- The College of New Jersey, Ewing Township
- Kean University, Union, Hillside
- New Jersey City University, Jersey City
- Ramapo College of New Jersey, Mahwah
- Stockton University, Galloway
- Thomas Edison State University, Trenton
- William Paterson University, Wayne

=== Independent colleges and universities ===
- Caldwell University, Caldwell
- Centenary University, Hackettstown
- Saint Elizabeth University, Morris Township
- Drew University, Madison
- Fairleigh Dickinson University, Madison/Florham Park, Teaneck/Hackensack
- Felician University, Lodi/Rutherford
- Georgian Court University, Lakewood
- Monmouth University, West Long Branch
- Princeton University, Princeton
- Rider University, Lawrenceville
  - Westminster Choir College, Princeton
- Seton Hall University, South Orange
  - Seton Hall University School of Law, Newark
- Saint Peter's University, Jersey City
- Stevens Institute of Technology, Hoboken

=== Community colleges ===
- Atlantic Cape Community College
- Bergen Community College
- Brookdale Community College
- Camden County College
- Essex County College
- Hudson County Community College
- Mercer County Community College
- Middlesex County College
- County College of Morris
- Ocean County College
- Passaic County Community College
- Raritan Valley Community College
- Rowan College at Burlington County
- Rowan College of South Jersey
- Salem Community College
- Sussex County Community College
- Union County College
- Warren County Community College

=== Talmudic schools and theological seminaries ===
- Beth Medrash Govoha, Lakewood
- New Brunswick Theological Seminary, New Brunswick
- Princeton Theological Seminary, Princeton
- Rabbinical College of America, Morristown
- Talmudical Academy of Central New Jersey, Adelphia

=== Independent religious colleges ===
- Assumption College for Sisters, Mendham
- Somerset Christian College, Zarephath

=== Proprietary institutions with degree-granting authority ===
- Berkeley College, Newark, Paramus, Woodland Park, Woodbridge Township
- Best Care College, East Orange
- DeVry University, Cherry Hill, North Brunswick, Paramus
- Jersey College, Ewing
- Jersey College, Teterboro
- Joe Kubert School of Cartoon and Graphic Art, Dover
- Strayer University, Cherry Hill, Lawrenceville, Piscataway

=== Graduate-only Institutions ===
- Hackensack Meridian School of Medicine, Nutley

== See also ==
- New Jersey § Education
- List of colleges and universities in New Jersey
- Lists of colleges and universities
- List of universities named after people
- Lists of business schools
- Lists of law schools
- List of medical schools
- List of pharmacy schools
- List of university and college schools of music
- Higher education in the United States
- Secondary education in the United States
- Primary education in the United States
- Education in the United States
- New Jersey student loan program
