= Pura Cruz =

Puerto Rican feminist artist

Pura Cruz (born September 2, 1942) is a Puerto Rican feminist artist most famous for her artworks in her Adam–1999 series and her Broken Guitar series. Cruz currently creates art in Long Island after living and moving from New York.

== Biography ==
On September 2, 1942, Pura Cruz was born in Santurce, Puerto Rico and later moved and grew up in East Harlem, New York. Cruz owes most of her artwork and inspiration to her life in New York, claiming that living in New York gave her “street smarts” and “independence” and allowed her art to convey social and political views. Although born in Puerto Rico and considered a Latin American feminist artist, growing up in New York gave her her roots and played a huge part in her childhood and who she is, even creating several collections and art pieces about her life in New York.

Unlike other young girls she grew up with, Cruz was more of a tomboy and read comics and superhero stories growing up. Wonder Woman played a large part in her childhood and helped find her femininity and strength in being a woman. Unlike most woman in her era who were submissive and catered to male needs, Wonder Woman provided Cruz with a sense of empowerment and individuality which inspired a lot of her work, even describing Wonder Woman as her role model. She rediscovered her admiration for Wonder Woman in her painting series entitled “Lost and Found.” In a culture where women were obligated to fit the needs of men, this superhero gave her the power to stand up for herself and started her career as an artist.

Helen Harrison describes the basis of Pura Cruz's art as "the struggle to preserve Hispanic traditions in the face of misunderstandings and hostility". Cruz also owes her inspiration to family folklore and "domestic magic".

Cruz describes her art process as sporadic, spontaneous, and pure, starting from just playing with art supplies. Her art usually does not start with a formula or set idea, but is executed through trial and error and usually involved political statements or a combination of her life in New York and upbringings in Puerto Rico.

Cruz is still alive at 77 years old and moved to Long Island in 1970 in interest of raising her three daughters there. One of her most famous pieces is a series of painting and sculptures entitled "Broken Guitars" as a memoir to her father’s death.

== Education ==
BA Degree in Studio Art, Liberal Arts and Sciences/Liberal Studies, Dean's List /Top 10% from Stony Brook University

Suffolk County Community College, Selden New York

Parsons School of Design, New York, New York

Activities and Societies: Co-curated art exhibitions for ten years with Marcia Weiner, Student Union Gallery Director/Stony Brook University

== Artworks ==
2006 Native New Yorker:

This is a painting representing Cruz’s development from childhood to adulthood in East Harlem and Manhattan. There are two pairs of lips growing from small to big and her face transforms into a New York skyline.

2010 Vertigo Series:

This series was inspired by Neil Armstrong who had vertigo but still became the first man on the moon, showing how one could overcome their disabilities.

Adam–1999 Series:

1990 Adam Gives Birth:

Cruz's Adam–1999 series includes different artworks depicting birth, and the male body. This particular painting shows a pregnant female with two heads; one looking at the viewer and one playing a musical instrument. This artwork has religious backgrounds as Adam is in a pieta position, suggesting how science crosses lines when topics on men giving birth are involved.

2015 Marcelo Lucero painting:

Cruz honored a painting for Lucero after he was stabbed to death by teenagers in 2008 as a result of a hate crime. This painting was to honor Lucero and to bring awareness to anti-Latino hate crimes in Long Island.

A Guitar Grows on Long Island: This was a painting done as a tribute to Marcelo Lucero including a thick black ribbon, a cross, and the guitar resembling a tree branching out.

Broken Guitara #41 (2002)

Red White and Blue Guitar: A guitar made in remembrance to the September 11th attacks.

== Exhibitions ==
1983 – Suffolk County Community College, Selden New York

1985 – Staller Art Center, Stony Brook, New York

1985 – Union Art Gallery, Stony Brook University, Stony Brook, New York

1987 – Vasarely Center, Soho, New York City, New York, 1987

1988 – Hofstra University, Hempstead, New York

1988 – Morin-Miller University, Hempstead, New York, New York

1989 – Clary-Minor Gallery, Buffalo, New York

1990 – Greater Port Jefferson Arts Council, Port Jefferson, New York

1990 – Union Gallery, Stony Brook Museum University, Stony Brook, New York 1990

1990 – Passaic County Community College, Paterson, New Jersey

1990 – Islip Art Museum, East Islip, New York

1991 – Northport/SB Spoke Gallery, Huntington, New York

1991 – Hillwood Art Museum, Brookville, New York

1991 – Smithtown Township Arts Council, St. James, New York

1991 – Discovery Art Gallery, Glen Cove, New York

1992 – Fine Art Museum of Long Island, Hempstead, New York

1992 – Vanderbilt Museum, Centerport, New York

1992 – Ceres Gallery, New York, New York

1993 – Islip Art Museum, Islip, New York

1944 – East End Arts Council, Riverhead, New York

1995 – U.N. 4th World Conference on Women, Beijing, China

2005 – Hofstra University Special Collections at Hofstra University in Long Island

2006 – Hofstra University Museum Emily Lowe Gallery

2018 – "A Guitara Grows on Long Island", Big Picture Exhibition in Long Island

== Collections ==
1999–Broken Guitar Collection: After Cruz’s father died, she vowed to make 1000 guitar sculptures in his memory as a tribute to him, her roots, her childhood, and her heritage. This series is still a work in progress, but guitars have a sentimental value to Cruz as her father played this guitar as a lead guitarist in Puerto Rico to help support her family.

== Honors and awards ==
WWCode Scholarship – Awarded scholarship through Zenva academy and plans to use it to expand visual arts through Java Script Programming.

"BIG PICTURE" Award of Excellence – Pura Cruz, "A Guitara Grows on Long Island". Cruz was awarded the Award of Excellence for this piece in her Broken Guitars collection by the Art League of Long Island in the BIG PICTURE exhibit.

== Publications ==
Pura Cruz has no known publications.

== Bibliography ==
- "Pura Cruz." 2017 Berkshire Conference, 18 Jan. 2016, 2017berkshireconference.wordpress.com/pura-cruz/.
- Bernhardt, Annette. "And the Winners of 'The BIG Picture' Large Works Exhibition Are.." Half Hollow Hills, NY Patch, Patch, 4 June 2018, patch.com/new-york/halfhollowhills/winners-big-picture-large-works-exhibition-are.
- "Pura Cruz." NEA, 23 Sept. 2015, www.arts.gov/50th/stories/pura-cruz.
- "Digital Collections." Digital Collections | New York State Archives, digitalcollections.archives.nysed.gov/index.php/Detail/Object/Show/object_id/17352
- "Digital Collections." Digital Collections | New York State Archives, digitalcollections.archives.nysed.gov/index.php/Detail/Object/Show/object_id/17354.
