= Salem Community College =

Public college in Salem County, New Jersey, US

Coordinates: 39.6998°N 75.4698°W

- Former name: Salem County Technical Institute (1958–1972)
- Type: Public community college
- Established: 1958
- President: Michael Gorman
- Undergraduates: 900
- Location: Carneys Point Township, New Jersey, United States
- Campus: Multi-campus
- Colors: Green
- Nickname: Mighty Oaks
- Website: www.salemcc.edu

Salem Community College (SCC) is a public community college in Salem County in the U.S. state of New Jersey. Salem Community College's main 11-acre (45,000 m^{2}) campus is in Carneys Point Township. SCC is authorized to grant associate degrees, including Associate in Arts, Associate in Fine Arts, Associate in Science, and Associate in Applied Science certificates. SCC also offers the only degree program in the US for scientific glassblowing.

Salem Community College was founded as Salem County Technical Institute in 1958. Recognizing the college-level caliber of the institute's programs, the Salem County Board of Chosen Freeholders requested approval to grant degree-awarding authority to the institute. The New Jersey Commission on Higher Education evaluated the institute's programs and granted the requested approval. On September 3, 1972, Salem Community College was established. It is accredited by the Middle States Commission on Higher Education.

== Notable alumni ==
- Evan Edinger (born 1990), American-born YouTuber based in London
- Paul Joseph Stankard (born 1943), glass artist and flameworker

== See also ==
- New Jersey County Colleges
- Lampworking
