= Paul Joseph Stankard =

American glass artist (1943–2026)

- Born: April 7, 1943; North Attleboro, Massachusetts, U.S.
- Died: October 6, 2026 (aged 83); Mantua Township, New Jersey, U.S.
- Education: Salem Community College
- Known for: glass artist; author of inspirational books for object makers
- Website: paulstankard.com

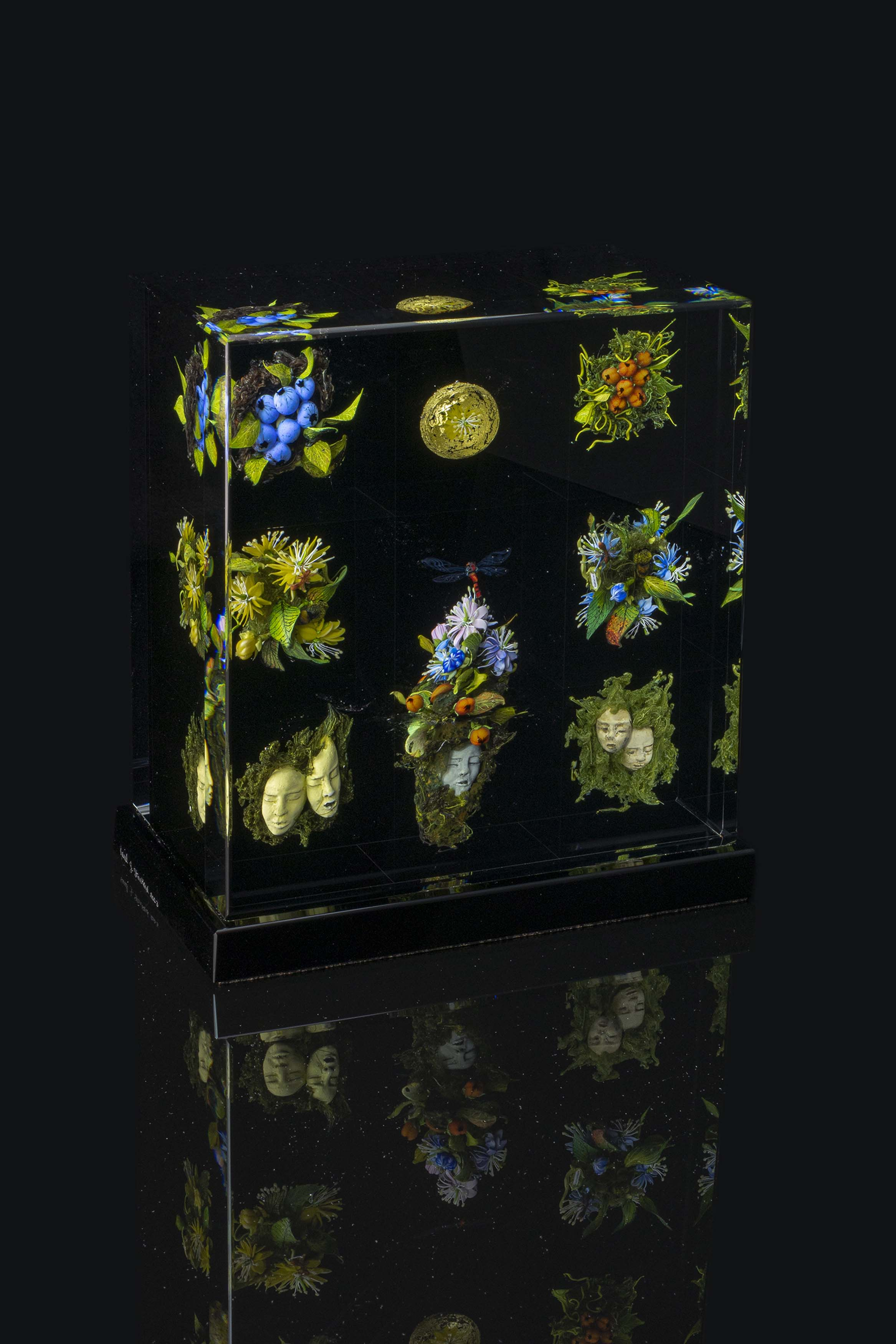

Paul Joseph Stankard (April 7, 1943 – October 6, 2026) was an American artist, flameworker (or 'lampworker') and author.

== Early life and education ==
Stankard was born in North Attleboro, Massachusetts, on April 7, 1943, the second of nine children in an Irish Catholic family. Stankard lived in North Attleboro in his early years. In his autobiography, Stankard chronicles his early struggles with dyslexia, which made classroom learning difficult. His high school transcripts showed him graduating near the bottom of his class, mistakenly assigned a low IQ score. In the book, Stankard describes the pressure and stigma of being labeled a slow learner by an educational system that at the time was not aware of dyslexia. In 1972 he discovered the concept of dyslexia and started to develop a self-directed learning program that heavily relied on books on tape (audible books). His 50-year learning journey led to two honorary doctorate degrees and allowed him to overcome his low self-esteem and learning disabilities to become one of the foremost glass artists of his generation.

In 1963 he graduated from Salem County Vocational-Technical Institute (since renamed as Salem Community College), with a technical certification in Scientific Glassblowing Technology. (Later, Salem CC conferred an honorary associate degree in Glass Art.)

== Career ==
For the first nine years of his work career (which included his training at Salem Vocational Technical Institute), he worked as a scientific glassblower crafting laboratory glass apparatus for various chemical laboratories. In 1967, Stankard worked under Francis Whittemore at Philco-Ford, whom he had met earlier while attending Salem, where Whittemore then taught. Earlier memories of seeing the Blaschka flowers at Harvard University and being in contact with Whittemore inspired Stankard to start experimenting with making paperweights in 1969.

Stankard, whose driving desire was to "be on the creative side and do what he loves", started producing glass paperweights in his utility room while working in the industry to support his growing family. It was when Stankard displayed his early paperweights at a craft exhibit on the boardwalk of Atlantic City, New Jersey, that Reese Palley, a respected art dealer, saw his work and sponsored Stankard financially to move full-time into making glass art.

In the early 1960s, paperweights made by other American paperweight makers showcased brightly colored floral designs based on antique French paperweights of the mid-nineteen hundreds. At that time, American paperweights were a weak imitation of the French paperweight tradition. In contrast, Stankard also followed the French tradition but his designs were distinguished by his more refined, botanically accurate characteristics. Stankard labored to make his glass floral designs look more natural and lifelike. His floral designs were becoming more real-looking so many people mistakenly thought that he found a way to encase actual flowers in glass. Soon thereafter, paperweight makers (mostly American) were following Stankard's lead.

Stankard is credited with changing the status of glass paperweights from that of craft to that of fine art. Among many other museums, his work is exhibited at the Art Institute of Chicago, the Renwick Gallery of the Smithsonian American Art Museum in Washington, D.C.; the Metropolitan Museum of Art in New York City; the Musée des Arts Décoratifs in Paris, France; the Victoria & Albert Museum in London, England; The Corning Museum of Glass in Corning, New York; Museum of American Glass, WheatonArts, Millville, New Jersey; the Wiener Museum of Decorative Arts in Hollywood, Florida; the Akron Art Museum in Akron, Ohio; and the Fort Wayne Museum of Art in Fort Wayne, Indiana.

== Personal life and death ==
Stankard was married to Patricia Stankard and had five children. By 2024, he had lived in southern New Jersey for more than 60 years. He died of cancer at his home in Mantua Township, New Jersey, on October 6, 2026, at the age of 83.

== Honorary degrees ==
- Rowan University, Doctor of Fine Arts, New Jersey, 1997
- Muskingum University, Doctor of Fine Arts, Ohio, 2007
- Salem Community College, Honorary Associate of Fine Arts, 2008

== Awards ==
- American Craft Council, American Craft Council College of Fellows in Recognition of Exceptional Craftsmanship, 2000
- Glass Art Society, Lifetime Achievement Award For Exceptional Achievement and Contributions to the Field of Studio Glass, 2015

== Books ==
- No Green Berries or Leaves: The Creative Journey of an Artist in Glass (published 2007)
- Spark the Creative Flame: Making the Journey from Craft to Art (published 2013)
- Craft as Career: A Guide to Achieving Excellence in Art-making (published 2016)
- Inspiration from the Art of Paul Stankard: A Window into My Studio and Soul (published 2022)
