= Don Bosco College =

Former Roman Catholic seminary in Newton, New Jersey

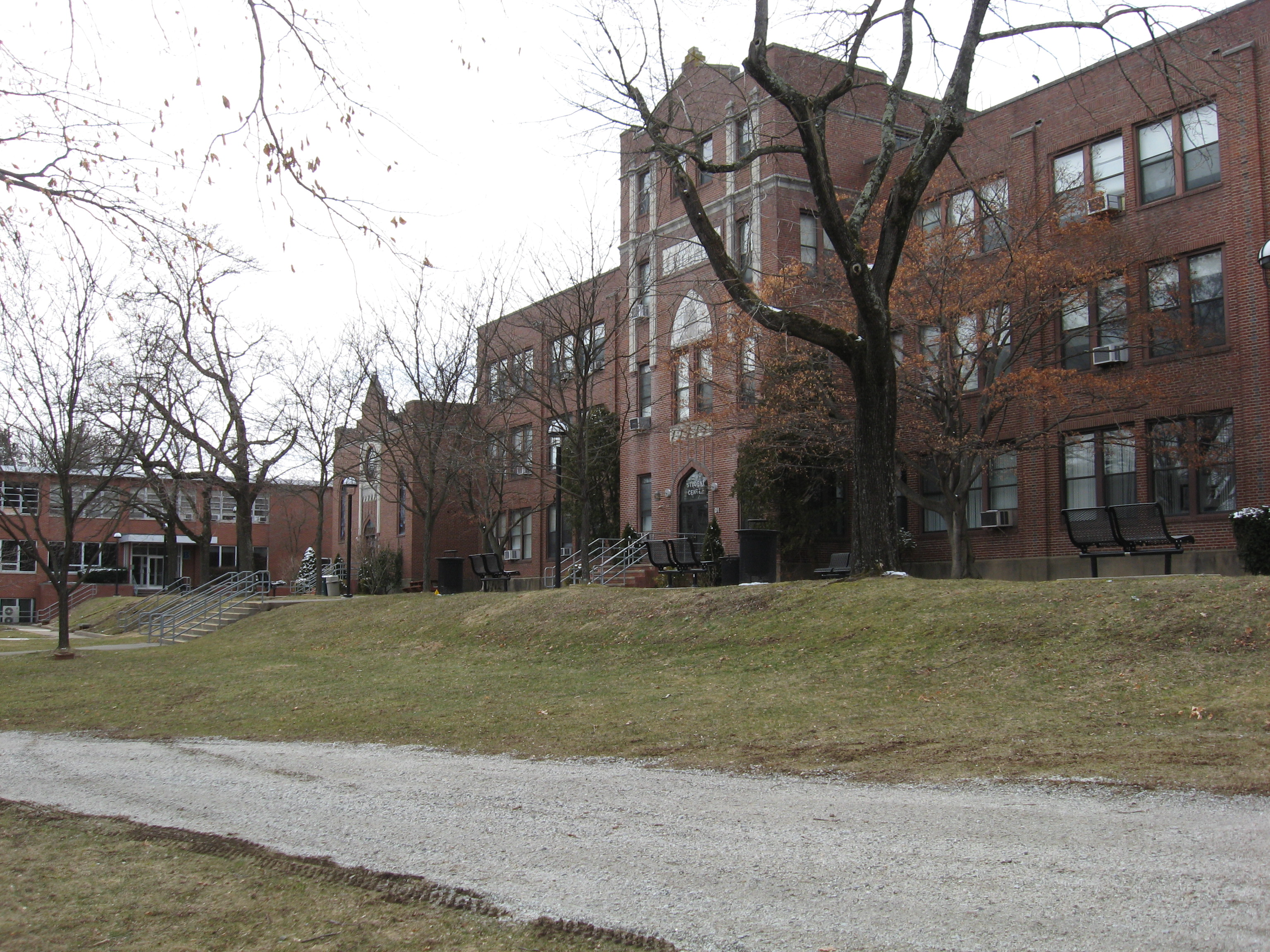
From its founding in 1928, Don Bosco College was a Roman Catholic seminary connected with the Salesian Order. In 1992, Sussex County bought the campus to develop a newly founded two-year college, Sussex County Community College, founded in 1992.

Don Bosco College was a Roman Catholic seminary located in Newton, New Jersey. Opening in 1928 (98 years ago), it was operated by the Salesian Order (Society of St. Francis de Sales) until it was closed in 1989 and its 179-acre campus sold to the Sussex County, New Jersey government on June 22, 1991 for US$4,209,800.

== History ==
=== Seminary ===
When the seminary opened, the campus consisted of the mansion of merchant, leather-goods manufacturer and railroad executive John A. Horton (1807–1858), built in 1857–1858, which became the "St. Joseph's House of Studies" and improved to accommodate class rooms, dormitories, recreation rooms, and study hall to accommodate about fifty novices. In the 1930s, ground was broken on an imposing two-story, red-brick building which was dedicated in 1931. Several other academic buildings and a gymnasium were constructed in the 1960s; a swimming pool was added in 1977.

=== Summer camp ===
From 1991 to 1998, the Salesians leased the campus during the summers as a camp for boys age 8–15. The hilltop camp consisted of a chapel, barrack style residential cabins, dining hall, & an outdoor covered area for communal events.

=== Present usage ===
Since the purchase, the campus has been converted and expanded as the main campus of Sussex County Community College (SCCC), a public two-year county college. Several new buildings have been built on the campus.
