= Adelphia, New Jersey =

Place in Monmouth County, New Jersey, US

- Unincorporated community
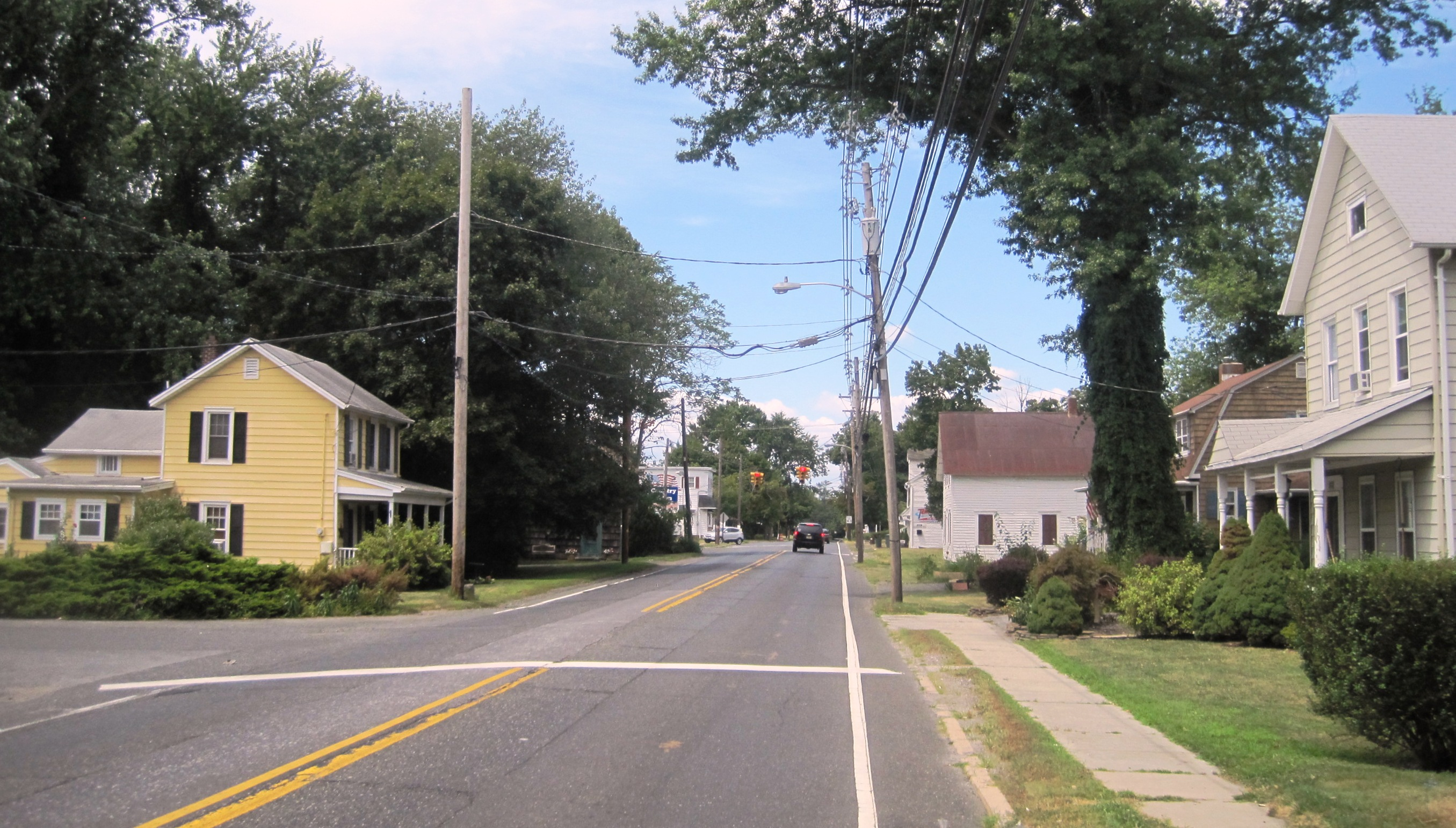
- Adelphia as seen from Elton Adelphia Road (CR 524) westbound approaching Wyckoff Mill Road

- Location in Monmouth County Location in New Jersey Location in the United States
- Coordinates: 40°13′05″N 74°15′23″W
- Country: United States
- State: New Jersey
- County: Monmouth
- Township: Howell
- Elevation: 98 ft (30 m)
- ZIP code: 07710
- GNIS feature ID: 0874260

Adelphia is an unincorporated community located in northern Howell Township, Monmouth County, in the U.S. state of New Jersey. The area is served as United States Postal Service ZIP code 07710. The community borders Freehold Township, and residents who reside in Adelphia use a Freehold mailing address.

== Nomenclature ==
Prior to the community adapting its name from the Greek word for 'brotherhood' (adelphia), the area was previously known as Turkey. The only remnants of Turkey happen to lie within the title of a nearby county park, Turkey Swamp Park. Prior to the Turkey name the area was called "Blue Ball".

== Geography and demographics ==
The community of Adelphia has a total area of 35.41 square kilometres (13.67 sq mi) and an estimated population of 17,000. The area is bordered by nearby Colts Neck Township, Farmingdale, and Freehold Township.

== Education ==
From Kindergarten to Grade 8, public school students in Adelphia are educated by Howell Township Public Schools. Public school students from Kindergarten-2nd grade attend Adelphia School or Griebling School, from grades 3-5 attend Howell Memorial School, and from grades 6-8 attend Howell Middle School North. Public school students from grades 9-12 attend either Howell High School, Freehold Township High School or Colts Neck High School, (depending on their home address) as a part of the Freehold Regional High School District.

The New Jersey Agricultural Experiment Station of Rutgers University has a facility in Adelphia, the Rutgers Plant Science Research and Extension Farm.

Adelphia is also the home of the Talmudical Academy of Central New Jersey, an Orthodox Jewish yeshiva high school and rabbinical college.

== Transportation ==
The Howell Park & Ride, located in the neighborhood of Adelphia off of U.S. Route 9, is utilized by many commuters. From the park & ride, New Jersey Transit provides bus transportation to and from the Port Authority Bus Terminal in Midtown Manhattan on the 139 route and to both Jersey City and Newark on the 64 and 67 routes. Bus service is also available from Adelphia to Wall Street in the Financial District of Lower Manhattan via the Academy Bus Line.

== Climate ==
The climate in this area is characterized by hot, humid summers and generally mild to cool winters. According to the Köppen Climate Classification system, Adelphia has a humid subtropical climate, abbreviated "Cfa" on climate maps.

== Notable people ==
People who were born in, residents of, or otherwise closely associated with Adelphia include:

- Charles Asa Francis (1855–1934), politician who served in both the New Jersey General Assembly and New Jersey Senate.

== Nearby historic communities ==
- Allaire in Wall Township
- Cassville in Jackson Township
- Clarksburg in Millstone Township
- Dayton in South Brunswick
- Jerseyville in Howell Township
- Marlboro in Marlboro Township, along with a detailed list of Historic Sites in Marlboro Township
- The Middletown Village Historic District in Middletown Township
- The Monmouth Battlefield Historic District in Freehold Township and Manalapan Township
- Ocean Grove in Neptune Township
- Old Bridge in East Brunswick
- Perrineville in Millstone Township
- Ramtown in Howell Township
- Tennent in Manalapan Township
- Wayside in Tinton Falls and Ocean Township (Monmouth County)
- West Freehold in Freehold Township
