= Middletown Village, New Jersey =

Populated place in Monmouth County, New Jersey, US

- Unincorporated community
- Location within Monmouth County, New Jersey Location within New Jersey Location within the United States
- Coordinates: 40°23′39″N 74°7′2″W
- Country: United States
- State: New Jersey
- County: Monmouth
- Township: Middletown
- Elevation: 112 ft (34 m)
- GNIS feature ID: 882505

Middletown Village is an unincorporated community located in the central part of Middletown Township, Monmouth County, New Jersey. It was the first settlement in the township and one of the oldest in New Jersey. The Middletown Village Historic District, encompassing the community, was listed on the state and national registers of historic places in 1974.

== History ==
The first land purchase was a deed dated in 1664 and settlement of the area started soon afterwards. The Kings Highway was established in 1719. On June 29, 1778, British forces used the road to withdraw after the Battle of Monmouth.

== Historic district ==
- Middletown Village Historic District
- U.S. National Register of Historic Places
- U.S. Historic district
- New Jersey Register of Historic Places
- Location: Irregular pattern on both sides of Kings Highway, south and west of NJ 35, Middletown Township, New Jersey
- Area: 80 acres (32 ha)
- Built: 1664
- NRHP reference No.: 74001177
- NJRHP No.: 2026

Significant dates
- Added to NRHP: May 3, 1974
- Designated NJRHP: December 20, 1973

The Middletown Village Historic District is an 80-acre (32 ha) historic district located on both sides of Kings Highway, south and west of NJ 35. The district was added to the National Register of Historic Places on May 3, 1974, for its significance in education, military history, political history, religion, and settlement. It includes 15 contributing resources, including Christ Church.

== Religion ==
There are three historic churches along Kings Highway. The Old First Church, founded in 1688, is the oldest Baptist congregation in New Jersey. Christ Church, founded in 1702, is one of the oldest Episcopal parishes in New Jersey. The Middletown Reformed Church dates from 1836.

== Gallery ==
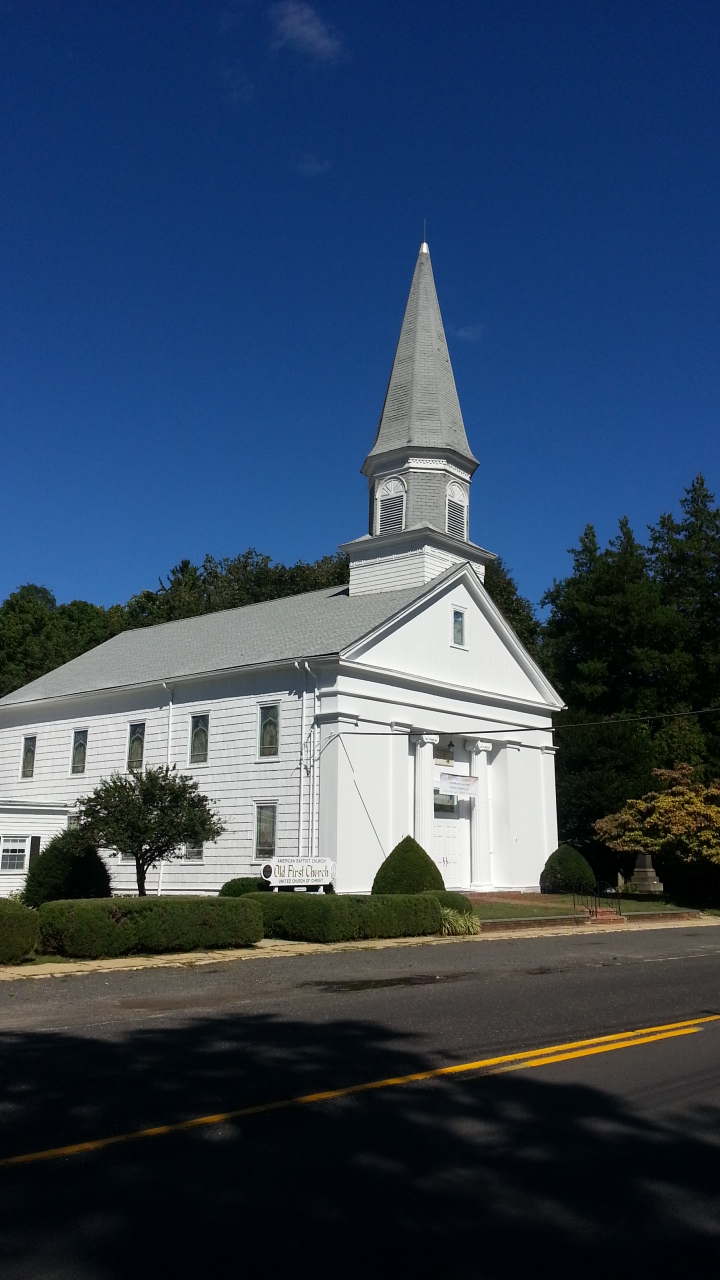
Old First Church

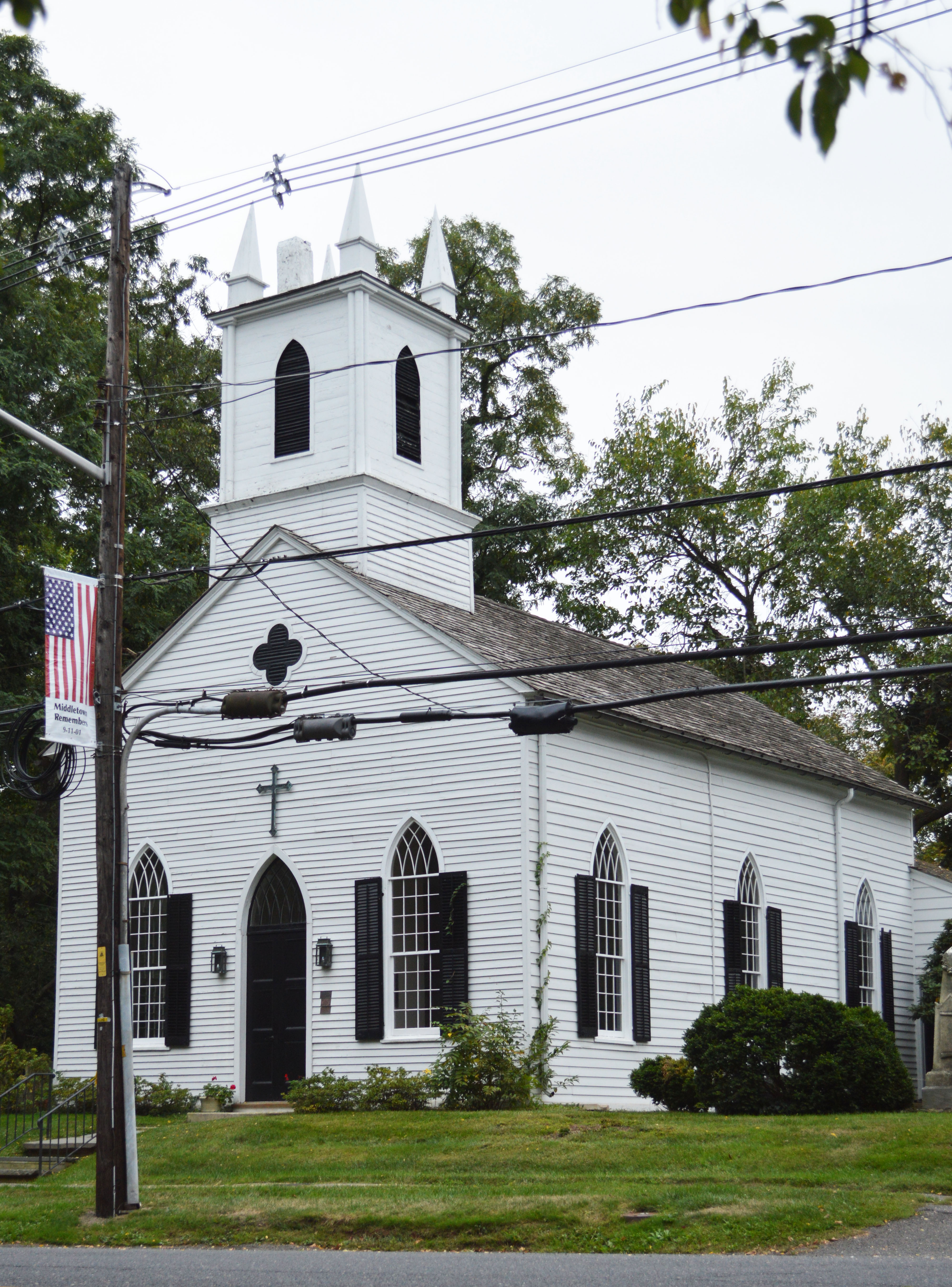
Christ Church

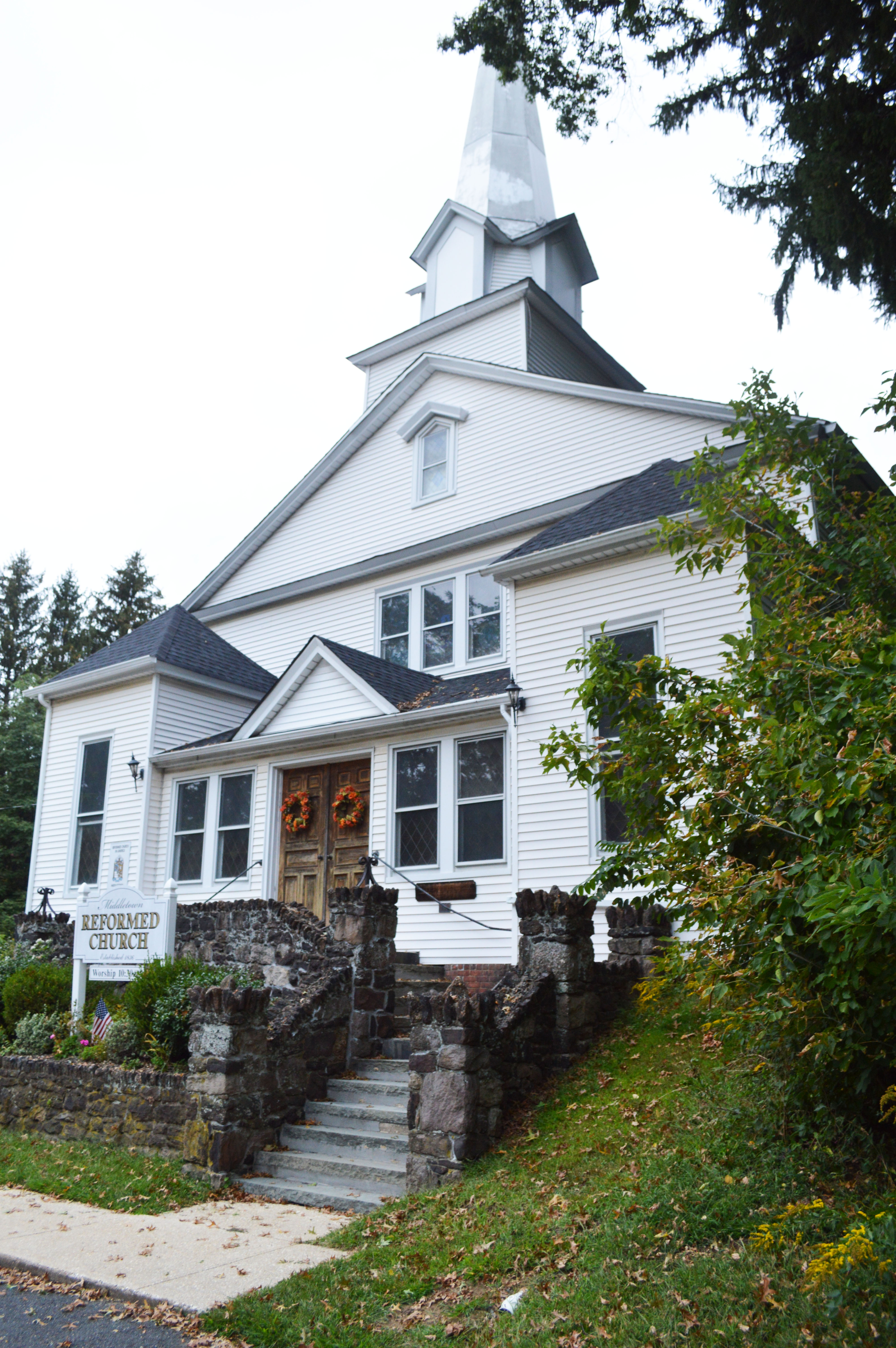
Reformed Church

== See also ==
- National Register of Historic Places listings in Monmouth County, New Jersey
