= Jersey College =

College in New Jersey, United States

Coordinates: 40.86249°N 74.05756°W

- Former names: The Center for Allied Health & Nursing Education
- Motto: P.R.I.D.E.:Professionalism, Respect, Integrity, Diversity, Excellence
- Type: Private for-profit career college
- Established: 2003
- President: Steven B. Litvack
- Founder & Chancellor: Greg Karzhevsky
- Faculty: 650
- Students: 4,089
- Location: Teterboro, New Jersey, United States
- Campus: Multiple: Teterboro, New Jersey, Ewing Township, NJ, Tampa, Florida, Jacksonville, Florida, Fort Lauderdale, Florida, Largo, Florida, Port Charlotte, Florida, Fort Wayne, Indiana, Brooksville, Florida, Naples, Florida, Cleveland, Tennessee, Knoxville, Tennessee, Jenkintown, Pennsylvania, Tucson, Arizona, Scranton, Pennsylvania, Melbourne, Florida, Dothan, Alabama, York, Pennsylvania
- Colors: Red and Gold
- Website: www.jerseycollege.edu
- JC Coat of Arms

Jersey College is a private college specializing in nursing education with its main campus in Teterboro, New Jersey. The college was established in 2003 and started its first class in 2004. Jersey College has eighteen other locations in Alabama, Arizona, Florida, Indiana, New Jersey, Pennsylvania, and Tennessee.

== History ==
Established in 2003, Jersey College's nursing school was founded in New Jersey by Greg Karzhevsky and originally called The Center for Allied Health & Nursing Education. The aim of the institution was to develop highly trained and skilled nurses to work at New Jersey's largest home care agency operated by the Karzhevsky family.

In 2004, the center was approved by the New Jersey Board of Nursing to offer a Practical Nursing Program. The center expanded its student body and increased its staff of instructors and administrators.

In 2007, following its national accreditation from the Council on Occupational Education and approval from the United States Department of Education, the school opened a second campus in Tampa, FL. The South Jersey campus in Ewing, NJ opened shortly after in 2009. The school was awarded approval for a Professional Nursing Program in 2010 and opened the Jacksonville campus. The Fort Lauderdale campus was created in 2012.

In November of that year, the school received approval from the New Jersey Commission on Higher Education and the New Jersey Board of Nursing to offer a Registered Nursing Program with an associate degree. The Center for Allied Health and Nursing Education changed its name to Jersey College to coincide with the pursuit of higher education opportunities. The college has produced more than 10,000 graduates in the nursing field.

In July 2014, the Jersey College campus at Tampa, Florida expanded to a 40,000 square foot facility in Sabal Park, that includes two floors of observation rooms, computer labs, simulation labs, classrooms, a library, and a cafeteria.

In 2016, Jersey College added its sixth campus through a collaboration with Largo Hospital by establishing a campus inside of the Indian Rocks campus of Largo Hospital in Largo, Florida.

In 2020, Jersey College added its seventh campus through a collaboration with Community Health Systems at Bayfront Health Port Charlotte in Port Charlotte, Florida. The campus is located on the grounds of the hospital and hosts the Hospital-Based nursing track of the Professional Nursing program.

In 2021, Jersey College added its eighth campus through a collaboration with Community Health Systems and Lutheran Health Network at Lutheran Hospital of Indiana in Fort Wayne, Indiana. The campus is located on the grounds of the hospital and hosts the Hospital-Based nursing track of the Professional Nursing program

In 2022, Jersey College added its three additional campuses through a collaboration with Community Health Systems at Bravera Health Brooksville in Brooksville, Florida; at Physicians Regional Medical Center in Naples, Florida; and at Tennova Healthcare - Cleveland in Cleveland, Tennessee.

In 2023, Jersey College added five additional campuses in collaboration with Northwest Healthcare in Tucson, Arizona; Commonwealth Health in Scranton, Pennsylvania; and Melbourne Regional Medical Center in Melbourne, Florida; Tennova Healthcare - Turkey Creek in Knoxville, Tennessee; and Mountain Vista Medical Center in Tucson, Arizona. In addition, a freestanding campus was opened in Jenkintown, Pennsylvania, just north of Philadelphia.

In 2024, the Dothan, Alabama campus opened in collaboration with Flowers Hospital; the Mesa, Arizona campus opened in collaboration with Northwest Healthcare, and the York, Pennsylvania campus opened in collaboration with WellSpan Health.

== Campuses ==
Jersey College has nineteen locations in Alabama, Arizona, Indiana, Florida, New Jersey, Pennsylvania, and Tennessee.

== Academics ==
Jersey College offers two programs. The Practical Nursing or "LPN" Program prepares students for careers in Licensed Practical Nursing. The program includes theoretical instruction on the foundations of practical nursing and clinical experience in practicing patient care. The program covers basic anatomy, disease processes, medications, treatments, care planning, and preparation for NCLEX-PN licensing examination.

The Professional Nursing or "RN" Program is for students starting their nursing education who aim to become registered nurses or for Licensed Practical Nurses seeking to continue their education. Certain campuses also offer the RN program in a Hospital-Based option. Graduates receive either an Associate of Applied Science (AAS) degree in Nursing or an Associate of Science (AS) degree in Nursing. The program covers medical-surgical, geriatric, maternal, pediatric, and mental health topics as well as preparation for the NCLEX-RN examination.

=== Accreditation and licensing ===
Jersey College has received accreditation and licensing from the following organizations:

- 2004 New Jersey Board of Nursing
- 2007 Council on Occupational Education
- 2008 Florida Board of Nursing
- 2008 Florida Commission for Independent Education
- 2012 New Jersey Commission on Higher Education
- 2018 Accreditation Commission for Education in Nursing,
  - Associate Degree (RN) Program, Fort Lauderdale Campus
  - Associate Degree (RN) Program, Jacksonville Campus
  - Associate Degree (RN) Program, Tampa Campus
  - Associate Degree (RN) Program, Teterboro Campus
  - Associate Degree (RN) Program, Ewing Campus
  - Associate Degree (RN) Program, Largo Campus
- 2020 Indiana Commission for Higher Education
- 2021 Indiana State Board of Nursing
- 2022 Tennessee Higher Education Commission
- 2022 Tennessee Board of Nursing
- 2022 Arizona State Board for Private Postsecondary Education
- 2022 Arizona State Board of Nursing
- 2022 Pennsylvania Department of Education
- 2022 Pennsylvania State Board of Nursing
- 2023 Private School Licensure Division of the Alabama Community College System
- 2023 Alabama Board of Nursing
- 2023 Accreditation Commission for Education in Nursing
  - Associate Degree (RN) Program, Port Charlotte Campus
  - Associate Degree (RN) Program, Fort Wayne Campus
- 2024 Accreditation Commission for Education in Nursing
  - Associate Degree (RN) Program, Brooksville Campus
  - Associate Degree (RN) Program, Naples Campus
- 2025 Accreditation Commission for Education in Nursing
  - Associate Degree (RN) Program, Cleveland and Knoxville Campuses
