= Warren County Community College =

College in Washington Township, New Jersey, US

Coordinates: 40.7433°N 75.0253°W

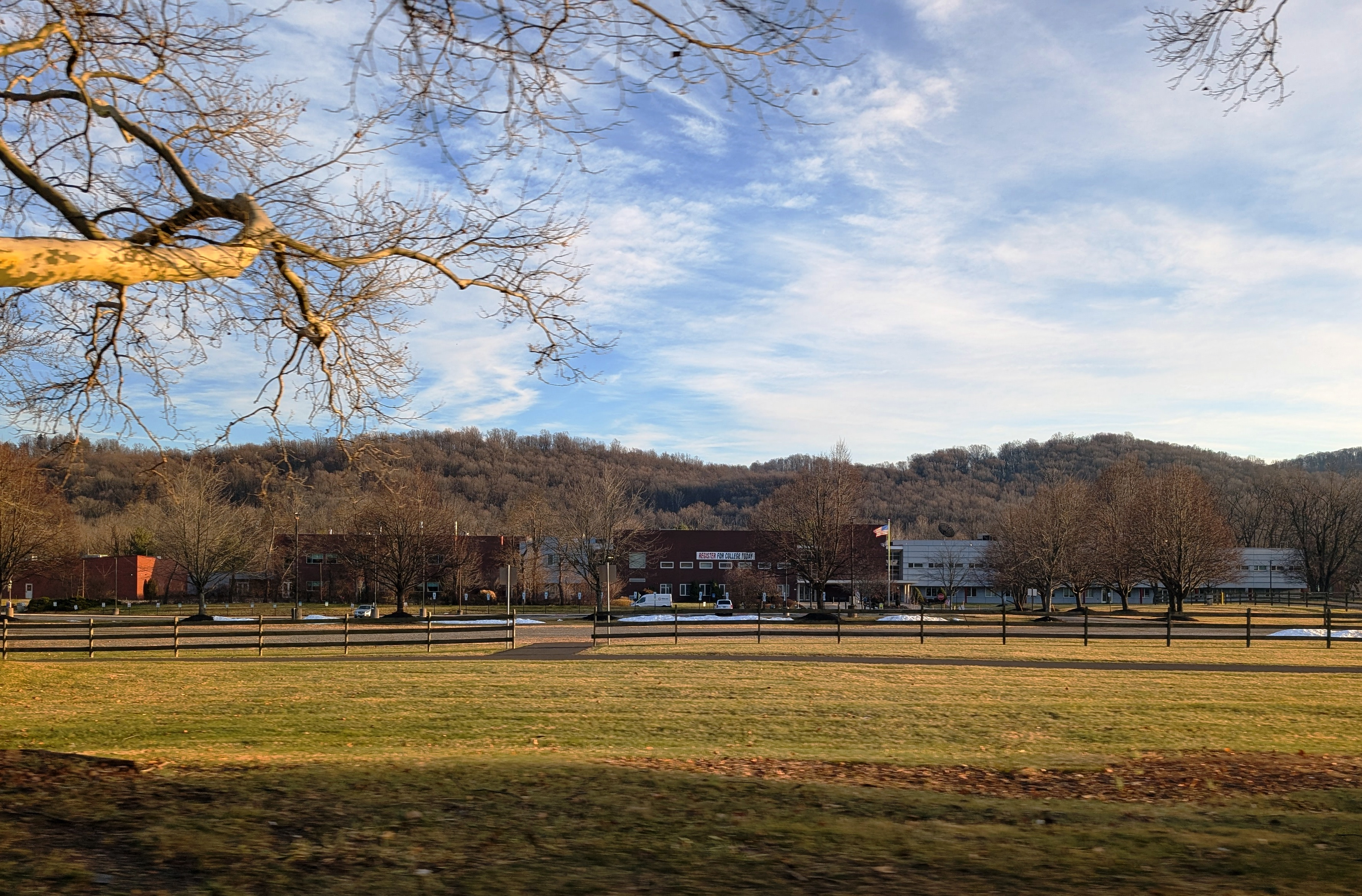
- Type: Public community college
- Established: 1981
- Affiliations: Middle States
- President: Dr. William Austin
- Students: 1,800
- Location: Washington, New Jersey, United States
- Nickname: Golden Eagles
- Website: www.warren.edu

Warren County Community College (WCCC) is a public community college in Warren County, New Jersey. Its campus is in Washington Township.

== History ==
Warren County Community College was established in 1981. Its first class of students graduated in 1988. Four years later, the college was accredited by the Middle States Association of Colleges and Schools.

== Academics ==
Warren County Community College offers degree programs and certificate programs. The college serves approximately 1,800 full-time and part-time students, in addition to students in non-credit programs and courses. Dr. William Austin has served as the college president since 2003.
