= Passaic County Community College =

Public college in Passaic County, New Jersey, US

Coordinates: 40.917183°N 74.168536°W

Passaic County Community College (PCCC) is a public community college in Passaic County, New Jersey, United States.

== Campuses ==
PCCC has four campuses located throughout the county it serves.

The main campus is located in Paterson, New Jersey, and opened in 1971. The Paterson campus is located on a stretch of Van Houten Street in downtown Paterson called College Boulevard, and occupies a footprint that extends out to Broadway near the Paterson Public Safety Complex.

Auxiliary campuses were later opened in Wanaque, New Jersey, serving the northern reaches of the county; Wayne, New Jersey, where the school's Public Safety Complex is located; and Passaic, New Jersey, home to the school's nursing program.

The school's athletic programs are known as the Panthers.

== See also ==
- New Jersey County Colleges
