= New Jersey Commission on Higher Education =

Government agency in New Jersey

The New Jersey Commission on Higher Education is a government agency in New Jersey that is responsible for providing coordination, planning, policy development, and advocacy for the state's higher education system. The Commission is also responsible for licensing of institutions and the administration of the Educational Opportunity Fund.

== History ==
It was established by the Higher Education Restructuring Act of 1994.

The Commission serves as the principal advocate for an integrated system of higher education which provides a broad scope of higher education programs and services. The system includes both public and independent institutions and enrolls over 380,000 full-time and part-time credit-seeking students statewide. The 31 public colleges and universities are Rutgers, The State University of New Jersey; the University of Medicine and Dentistry of New Jersey; the New Jersey Institute of Technology; four state colleges and five state universities; and 19 county colleges. The 26 independent institutions include 14 non-profit senior colleges and universities with a public mission: Princeton University, Fairleigh Dickinson University, Seton Hall University, Stevens Institute of Technology, Rider, Georgian Court, Drew, Caldwell College, Bloomfield College, Felician, St. Peter's University, Centenary, Monmouth, and the College of St. Elizabeth, as well as two independent two-year religious colleges, eight rabbinical schools and theological seminaries, both Catholic and Protestant, and four proprietary institutions with degree-granting authority.
