= New Jersey student loan program =

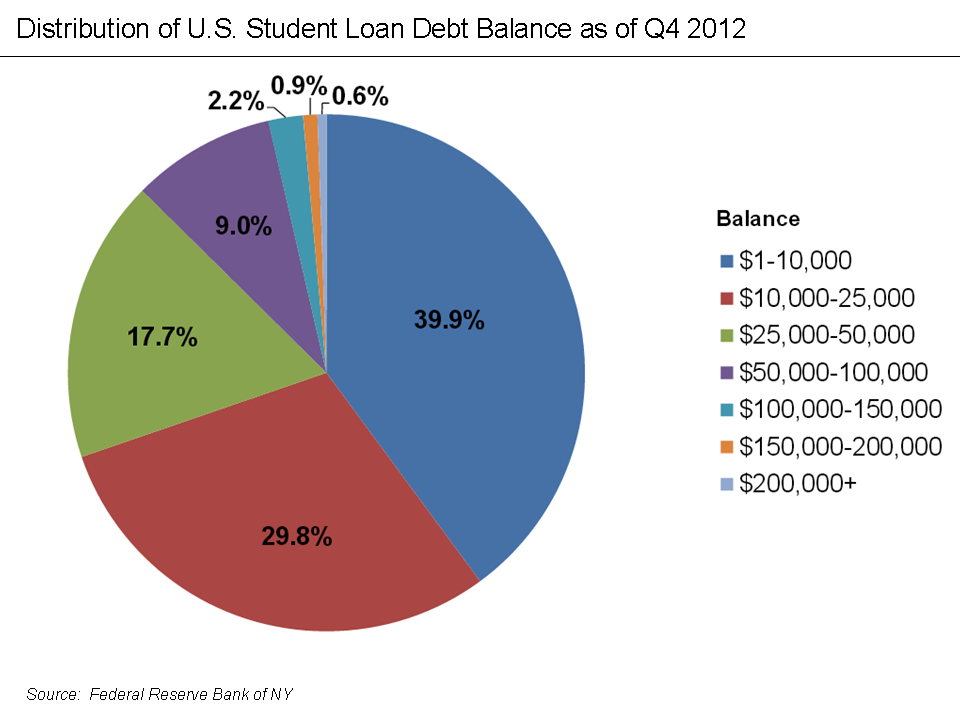
U.S. Student Loan Debt Distribution Q4 2012

The Higher Education Student Assistance Authority (HESAA) is a New Jersey State chartered-loan program, charged with providing student loan financing programs. It has received criticism in the New York Times for what the paper called its "extraordinarily stringent rules".

== Higher Education Student Assistance Authority (HESAA) ==
The Higher Education Student Assistance Authority has the responsibility of administering the state based student loan program. It is the largest in the United States by a significant proportion. Current student loans outstanding amount to $1.9 billion.

In 2016, the New York Times reported that the Authority's loans have "extraordinarily stringent rules that can easily lead to financial ruin". The report cited a case where the death of a debtor was determined to "not meet the threshold for loan forgiveness", with a bankruptcy lawyer claiming “It's state-sanctioned loan-sharking[.] The New Jersey program is set up so that you fail.”

Repayments cannot be adjusted based on income, and borrowers who are unemployed or facing other financial hardships are given few breaks.The loans also carry higher interest rates than similar federal programs. The State of New Jersey is permitted to garnish wages, rescind professional licenses, disallow income tax refunds, and forfeit borrower's lottery winnings. Court approval is not required. Collection practices have become more aggressive since 2010. Notably, families’ credit has been damaged while being compelled to surrender their salaries due to agency regulations.

The catalyst appears to be, “the state depends on Wall Street investors to finance student loans through tax-exempt bonds and needs to satisfy those investors by keeping losses to a minimum.” The programs collection practices have been described as having within their toolkit “a cudgel that even the most predatory for-profit players cannot wield" and that is "the power of the state".

== New Jersey Governor's Office ==
The Governor of New Jersey appoints the executive director of the program. Governor Chris Christie stated that the agency's policies and collection behaviors are not within his purview. Also, the appointment of 12 of the 18 board members of the organization is within the discretion of the Governor's office.
