= Talmudical Academy of Central New Jersey =

Location
- Adelphia, NJ 07710
- 40.215587°N 74.250412°W

Information
- Type: Private, Jewish
- Established: 1972
- Faculty: 4.0 FTEs
- Enrollment: 44 (as of 2013-14)
- Student to teacher ratio: 11.0:1

The Talmudical Academy of Central New Jersey (Adelphia) is an Orthodox Jewish yeshiva high school and rabbinical college in Howell Township, New Jersey, United States.

As of the 2013–14 school year, the school had an enrollment of 44 students and 4.0 classroom teachers (on an FTE basis), for a student–teacher ratio of 11.0:1. The school's student body was 100.0% White.

Founded in 1970 by Rabbi Yeruchim Shain in Adelphia, New Jersey, the school was originally a boarding school for high-school-college aged boys from the New York City area. Today the school has students from all over the world. Many of its alumni are teachers, principals and educators in their respective communities.

The Yeshiva has a state-of-the-art gym and a Mikvah (ritual bath) on its 10-acre (40,000 m^{2}) campus.

== See also ==
- List of high schools in New Jersey
