= Middle States Association of Colleges and Schools =

Voluntary, peer-based, non-profit association in Mid-Atlantic United States

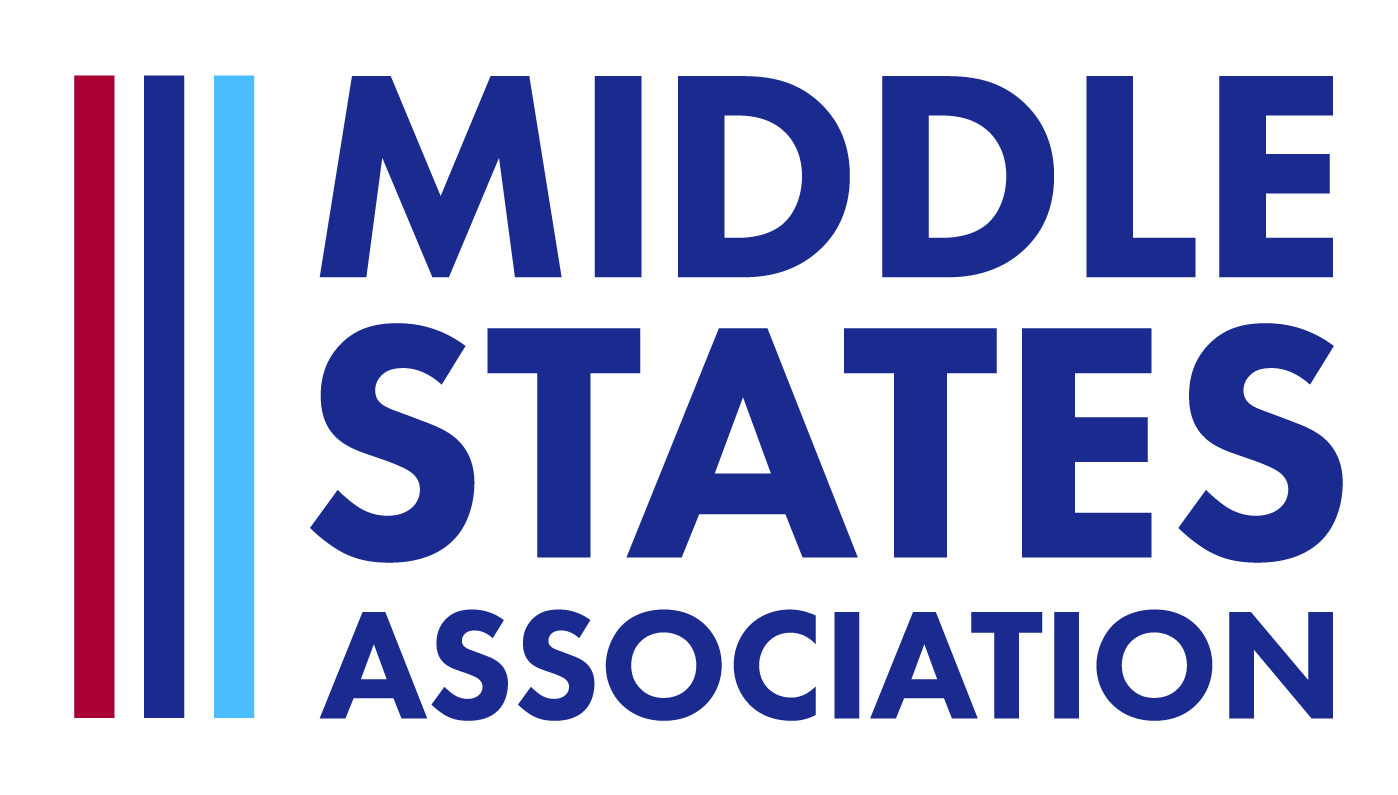
- MSA logo

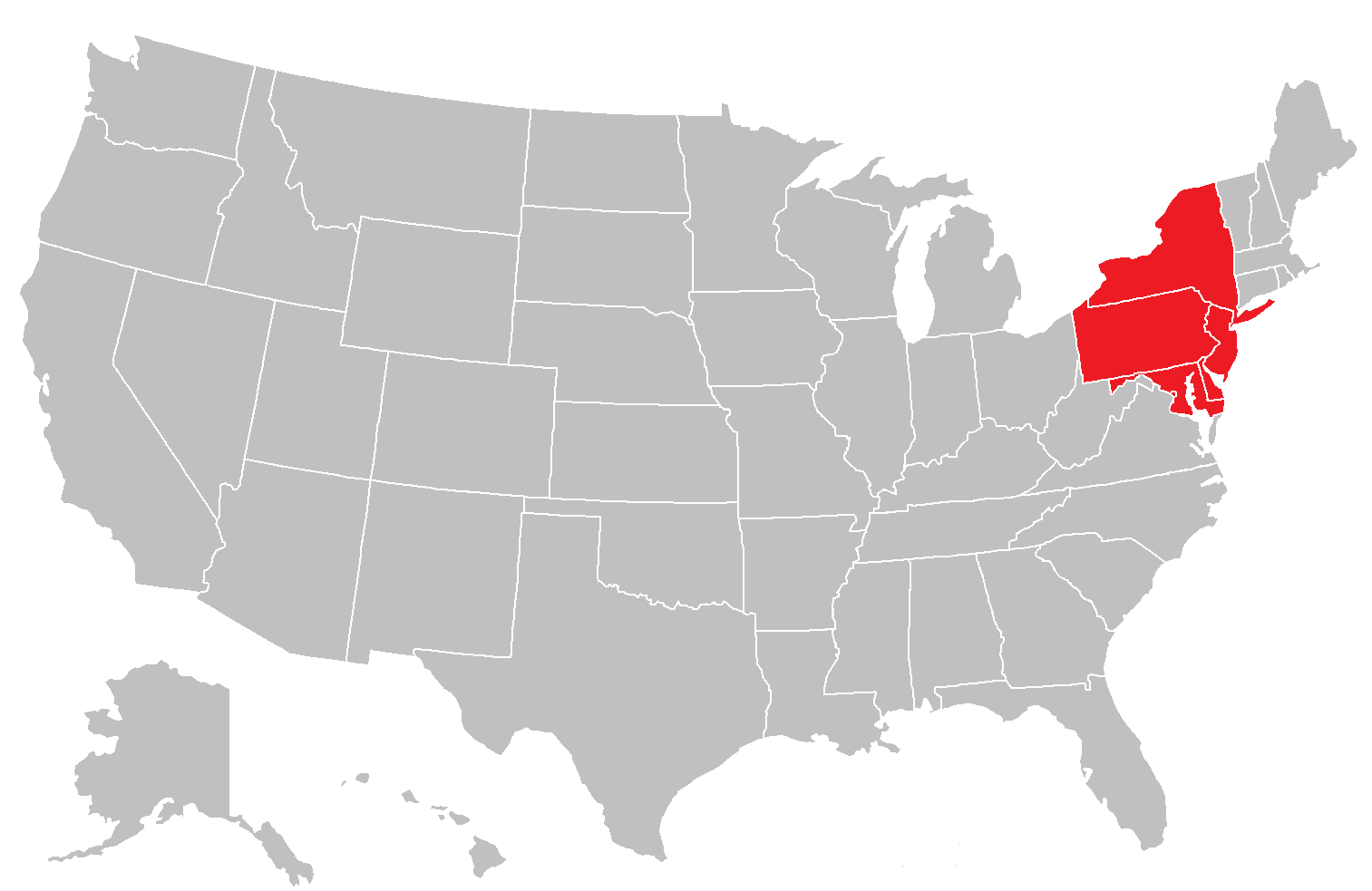
- Historical operational area
- Abbreviation: MSA-CESS
- Formation: 1887
- Legal status: Association
- Purpose: Educational accreditation
- Headquarters: Philadelphia, Pennsylvania, U.S.
- Region served: The United States and over 100 other countries world-wide
- President & CEO: Christian Talbot
- Main organ: Board of Trustees
- Website: msa-cess.org

The Middle States Association of Colleges and Schools (also referred to as the Middle States Association or MSA) is an accreditor in the United States. Historically, it has accredited schools in the Mid-Atlantic states region of the Northeastern United States. The peer-based, Philadelphia-based non-profit association was founded in 1887. It is a voluntary organization that performs peer evaluation and regional accreditation of public and private schools, including parochial/religious-owned and independent secular schools.

The association has two commissions, the Middle States Commission on Elementary Schools (MSCES) and Middle States Commission on Secondary Schools (MSCSS). A higher education commission, the Middle States Commission on Higher Education (MSCHE), operates completely independently of the other two commissions and is a separate nonprofit corporation. MSCSS also accredits some institutions that offer postsecondary education but only those that do not confer academic degrees or offer technical programs.

== Region and scope ==
The two Middle States Association Commissions on Elementary and Secondary Schools (MSA-CESS) as of 2026 accredit nearly 3400 public and private schools of elementary and secondary / high schools, along with the various school systems / districts of cities / towns and counties throughout the United States (especially in its originally designated Middle Atlantic states region) and those of American origin in more than 100 other countries around the world.

MSA used to accredit colleges and universities through its higher education commission. In 2013, that commission, the Middle States Commission on Higher Education, became a legally separate entity.

== See also ==
- Educational accreditation
- United States Department of Education
