= Middle States Commission on Higher Education =

University accreditation organization in the United States

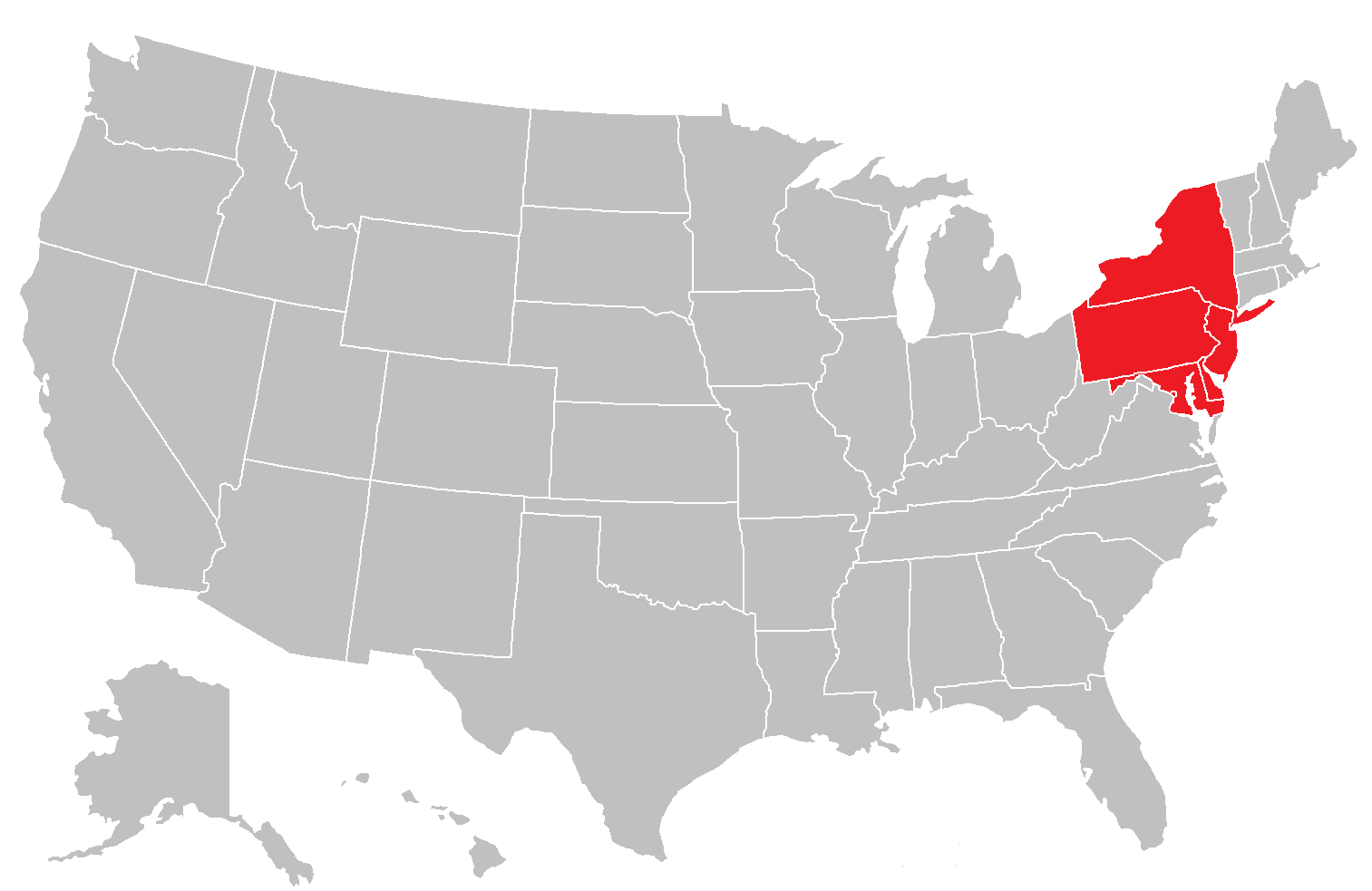
- MSCHE operational area
- Abbreviation: MSCHE
- Formation: 1887
- Legal status: Association
- Purpose: Higher education accreditation in the United States
- Headquarters: Wilmington, Delaware, U.S.
- Region served: Delaware, Washington, D.C., Maryland, New Jersey, New York, Pennsylvania, Puerto Rico, U.S. Virgin Islands and international locations
- Board president: Heather F. Perfetti
- Affiliations: CHEA and ED
- Website: www.msche.org

The Middle States Commission on Higher Education (MSCHE), legally incorporated as the Mid-Atlantic Region Commission on Higher Education, is a voluntary, peer-based, non-profit membership organization that performs peer evaluation and accreditation of public and private universities and colleges in the United States and foreign higher education institutions. Its headquarters are in Wilmington, Delaware.

The commission is recognized by the U.S. Department of Education and the Council for Higher Education Accreditation. It accredits nearly 600 institutions, primarily in Delaware, Washington, D.C., Maryland, New Jersey, New York, Pennsylvania, Puerto Rico, and the U.S. Virgin Islands.

== Region and scope ==
The Middle States Commission on Higher Education is recognized by the U.S. Department of Education to accredit degree-granting institutions. Its traditional region includes the U.S. states of New York, New Jersey, Pennsylvania, Delaware, and Maryland, and Washington, D.C. and the American territories and commonwealths of Puerto Rico, and the U.S. Virgin Islands that wish to participate in Federal "Title IV" student loan programs. More recently it has also accredited institutions in Colorado, Florida, Illinois, Texas and Virginia.

It also accredits institutions in the countries of Austria, Canada, Chile, Egypt, France, Ireland, Italy, Kuwait, Lebanon, Mexico, Panama, Peru, Switzerland, Taiwan, United Arab Emerites, United Kingdom and the British Virgin Islands.

== History ==
MSCHE grew out of the Middle States Association of Colleges and Schools (MSA), an organization established in 1887 to improve education using evaluation and accreditation. MSCHE itself was established in 1919 and was one of three commissions of MSA until 2013 when MSCHE incorporated as a separate entity in Pennsylvania as the Mid-Atlantic Region Commission on Higher Education doing business as the Middle States Commission on Higher Education. On July 1, 2019, MSCHE withdrew from MSA completely.

Until federal regulations changed in July 2020, it was considered one of the seven regional accreditation organizations.

== See also ==
- List of recognized higher education accreditation organizations
