= Minnesota Roller Derby =

American roller derby league

- Metro area: Minneapolis-Saint Paul
- Country: United States
- Founded: August 2004
- Teams: All-Stars (A team), Minnesota Nice (B team), Wednesday Warnings, Bodies of Water, Maul Rats, Roller Vortex, Windchill (training/development program and recreational travel team), Frostbite (Juniors)
- Track type: Flat
- Venue: Cheap Skate Roller Center (2004); Roy Wilkins Auditorium (2005-present)
- Affiliations: WFTDA, JRDA
- Org. type: LLC
- Website: mnrollerderby.com

Minnesota Roller Derby (MNRD) is a flat track roller derby league based in Saint Paul, Minnesota, in the United States. Founded in August 2004 as Minnesota RollerGirls by the Donnelly sisters, MNRD was one of the first 30 members of the Women's Flat Track Derby Association (WFTDA) by early 2006. Today the league has over 80 skaters playing on four home teams as well as their All-Star team, which has qualified for WFTDA Playoffs every year since its inception.

== League and business structure ==
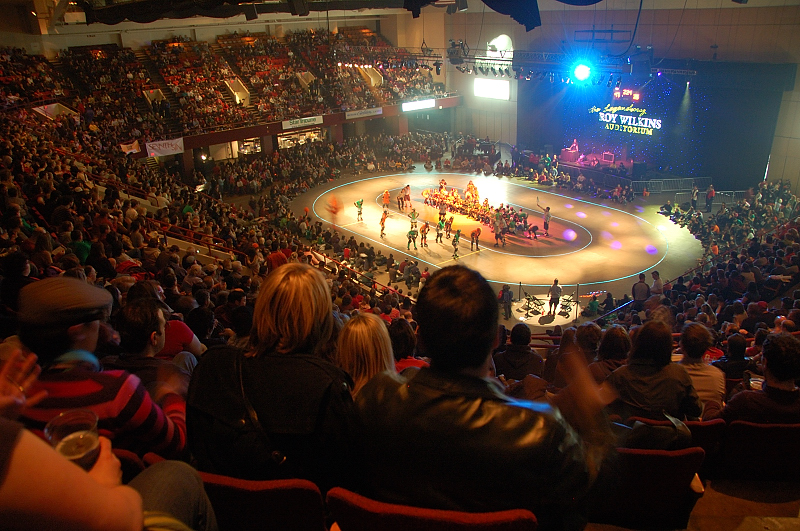
Over 3,700 spectators attend the opening bout of the 2007 season

Original Minnesota RollerGirls logo (2004-19)

Since 2005, the league has played and practiced at the Roy Wilkins Auditorium in Saint Paul, with capacity for up to 4,000 spectators for roller derby, and average attendance ranging between 1,800 and 3,000 fans at MNRD events. MNRD claims to be the first league in the country to have a professional space for practices and bouts.

Minnesota Roller Derby is a limited liability company composed of volunteer skaters aged 18 years and older and other volunteers. No skater or volunteer associated with the Minnesota Roller Derby is paid, nor do they profit based upon level of involvement or upon team wins. Proceeds raised by the league pay for practice space rental, legal and promotional fees, as well as traveling costs to play other WFTDA members in other states and in other countries. The remainder of the revenues are donated to a variety of local charities, with a general focus on organizations that benefit women.

In 2011, Minnesota began the DebuTaunts training and recreation program as a way to bring additional skaters into the league. By 2015, almost all new skaters in the league had spent at least one session in the recreation and training program. In 2016, the DebuTaunts began regularly bouting against regional opponents including Chippewa Valley Roller Derby (Eau Claire, Wisconsin) and the Roller Underground Dirty Ores (Eveleth, Minnesota), and by 2019 the DebuTaunts program, which rebranded as Windchill during that season, was re-envisioned as a primary "on-ramp" into Minnesota Roller Derby.

In 2018, the league launched a junior roller derby program, the Minnesota Frostbite, bringing its training resources in line with other top-tier roller derby leagues. The program is open to skaters of all genders aged 6–17.

In November, 2015, the Minnesota RollerGirls were the host league for the 2015 International WFTDA Championships at the Roy Wilkins Auditorium, and in May 2016, Visit Saint Paul named the Championships as their 2015 Event of the Year. The Minnesota All-Stars also competed at the tournament, losing their sole opening round game, 185-173 to Texas Rollergirls of Austin.

The Minnesota RollerGirls were ranked ninth in the world, as of September 25, 2016. In the WFTDA's 2022-23 return to regionalized play, they became a part of the WFTDA's North America West Region, along with traditional rivals like Rose City Rollers, Denver Roller Derby, Arch Rival Roller Derby, Windy City Rollers, and Madison Roller Derby.

In August 2019, the league adopted its current name as Minnesota Roller Derby, "to better reflect the organization’s membership and community".

== Home Teams ==
MNRG/MNRD Home Teams, 2005-2020
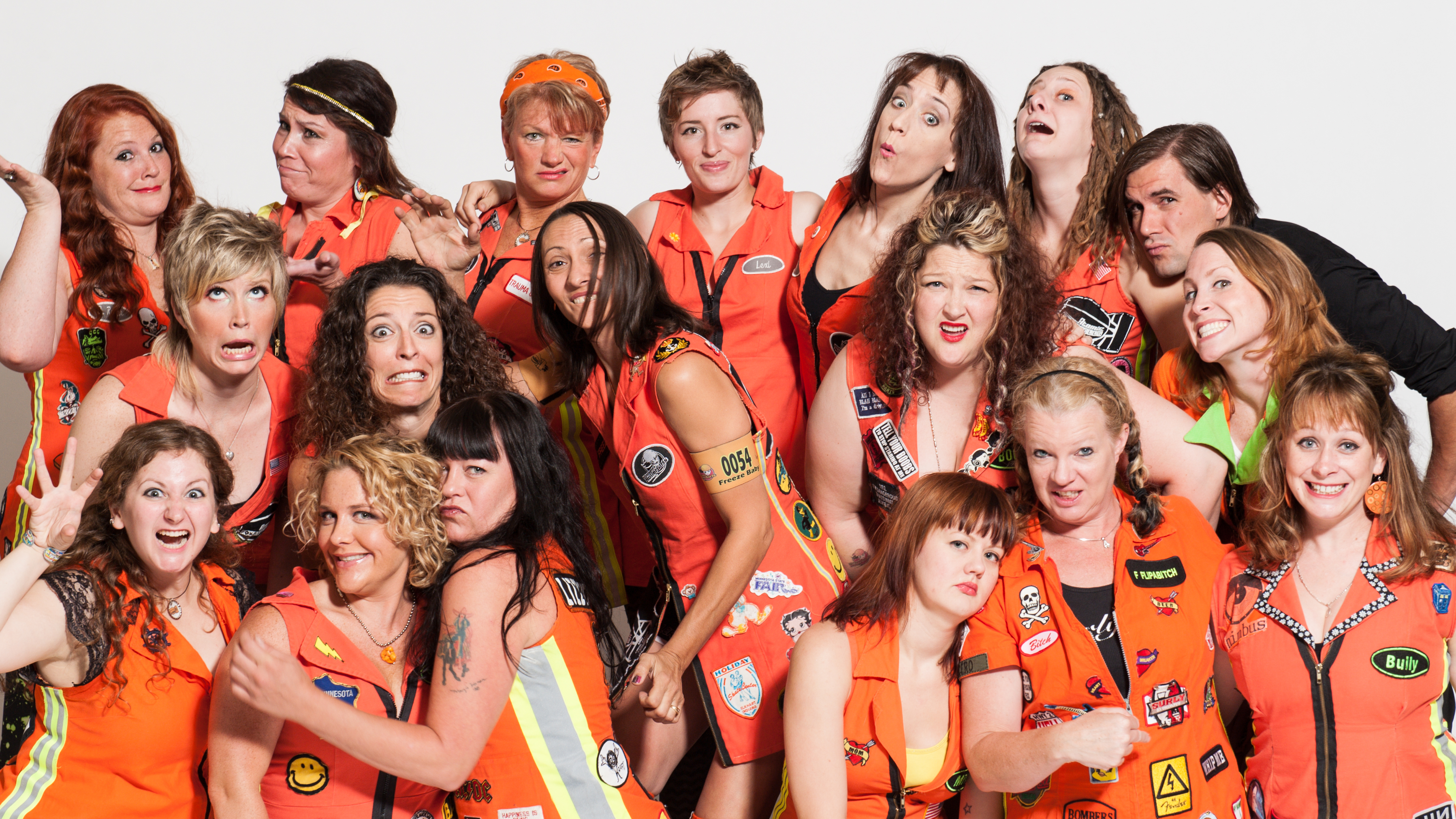
Atomic Bombshells

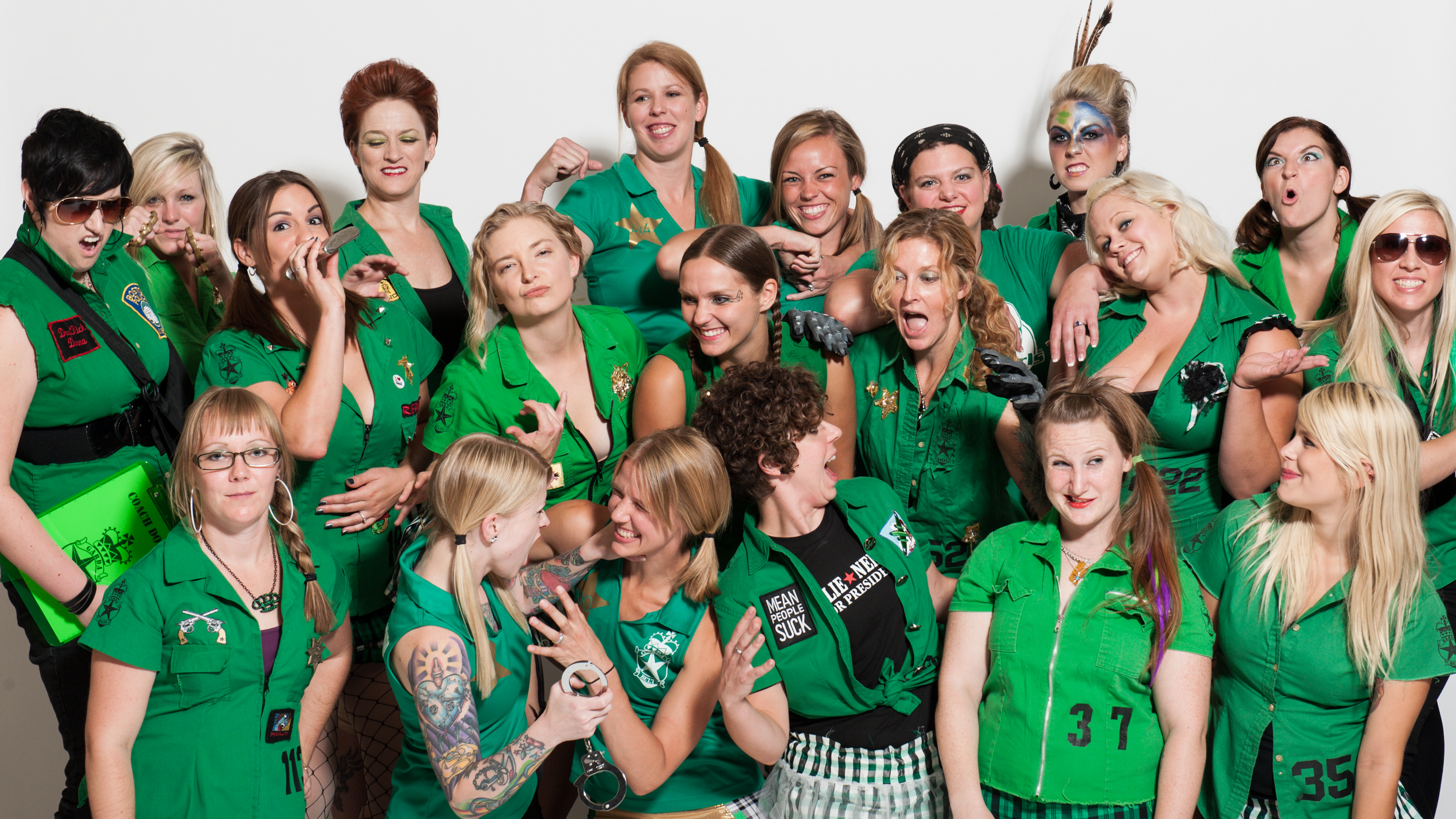
Garda Belts

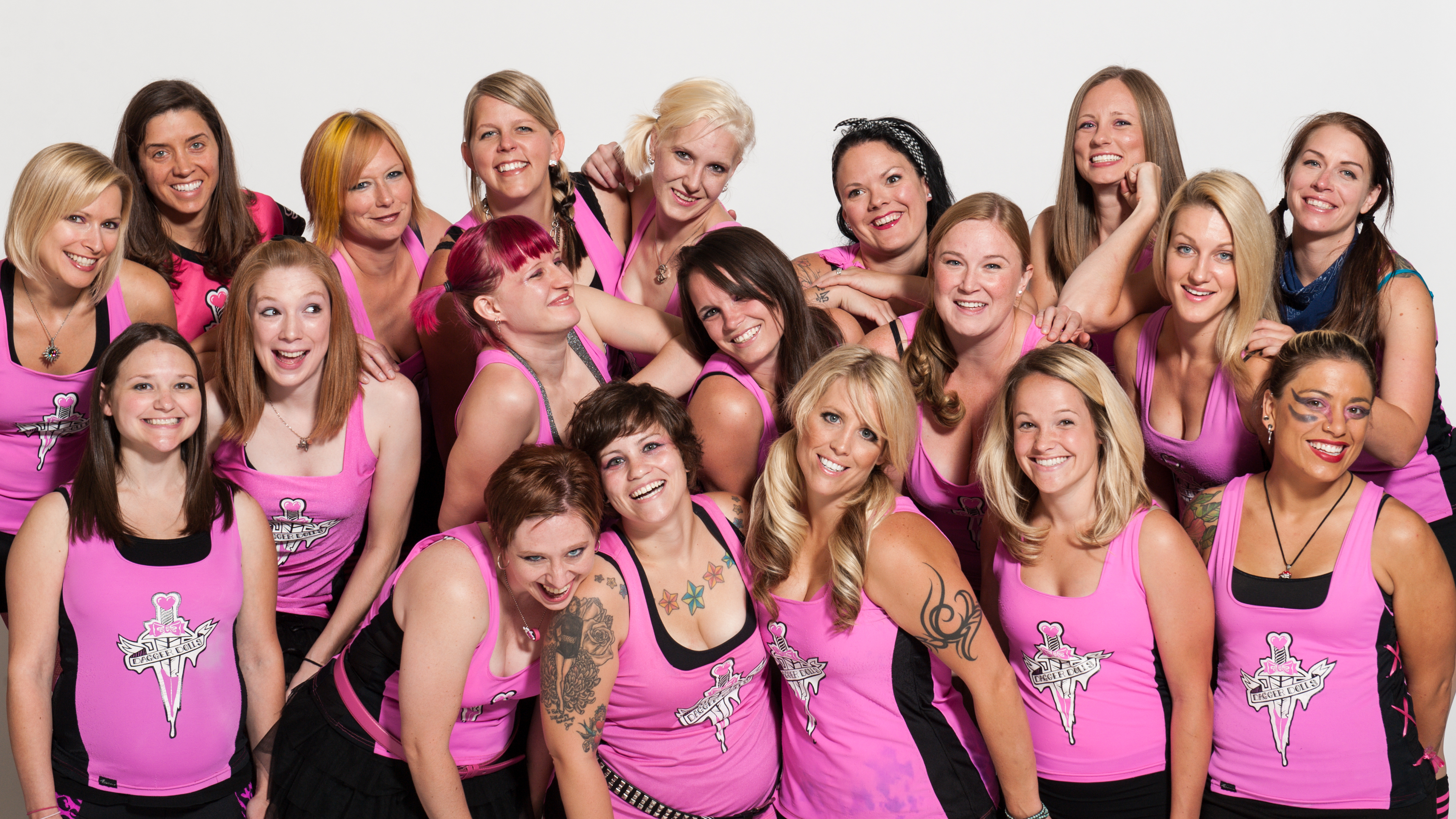
Dagger Dolls

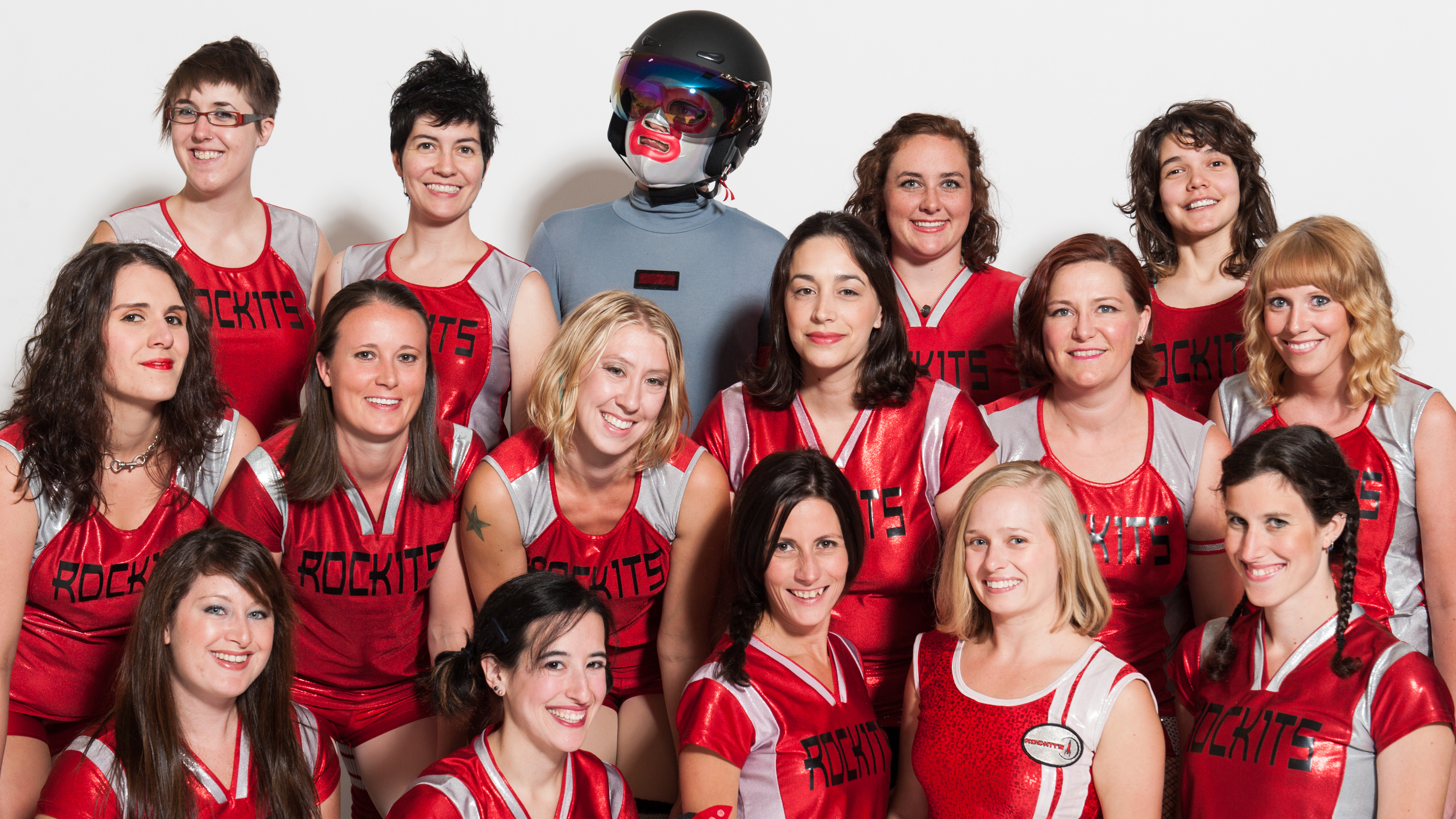
Rockits

Minnesota Roller Derby is composed of four home teams: the Bodies of Water, the Maul Rats, the Roller Vortex, and the Wednesday Warnings. These teams were created during a complete re-draft of the league following a missed Season 17 and a shortened Season 18 in which the league due to the COVID-19 pandemic fielded a pair of adult and a pair of junior teams. From 2005 to 2020, the league's home teams were the Atomic Bombshells, Dagger Dolls, Garda Belts, and Rockits. The Silver Bullets, which competed only in the league's inaugural season, were reorganized and re-themed as the Rockits for the 2005-06 season and remained the Rockits until the pandemic dissolved the original home teams. The four teams play against each other at home, with these games comprising the home season. Every MNRD home season concludes with a championship game, with the winner receiving the championship trophy, known as The Golden Skate.

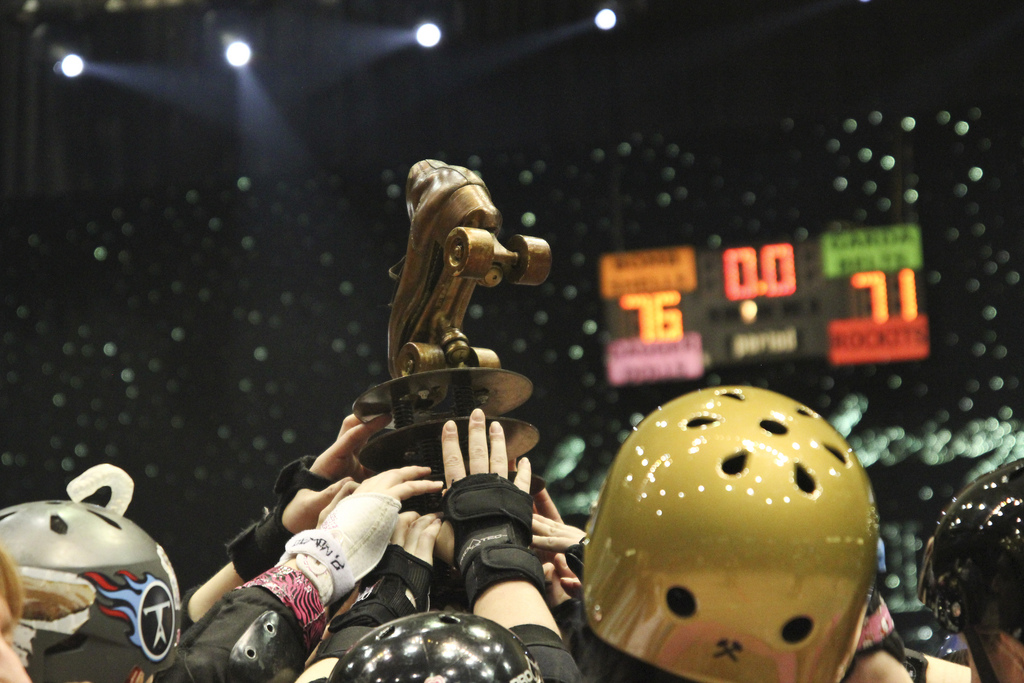
Dagger Dolls win the Golden Skate in 2012

Winners of the Golden Skate
| Year | Season Champion |
|---|---|
| 2005 | Dagger Dolls |
| 2006 | The Rockits |
| 2007 | Atomic Bombshells |
| 2008 | The Rockits |
| 2009 | The Rockits |
| 2010 | Atomic Bombshells |
| 2011 | The Rockits |
| 2012 | Dagger Dolls |
| 2013 | Atomic Bombshells |
| 2014 | Garda Belts |
| 2015 | Dagger Dolls |
| 2016 | Atomic Bombshells |
| 2017 | Atomic Bombshells |
| 2018 | Atomic Bombshells |
| 2019 | Rockits |
| 2020 | Rockits |

In 2018 a new trophy for the winner of the third-place game was unveiled. The inaugural Bronze Bearing Trophy was won for the first time by the Garda Belts.

Winners of the Bronze Bearing
| Year | Season Champion |
|---|---|
| 2018 | Garda Belts |

== Travel Team ==
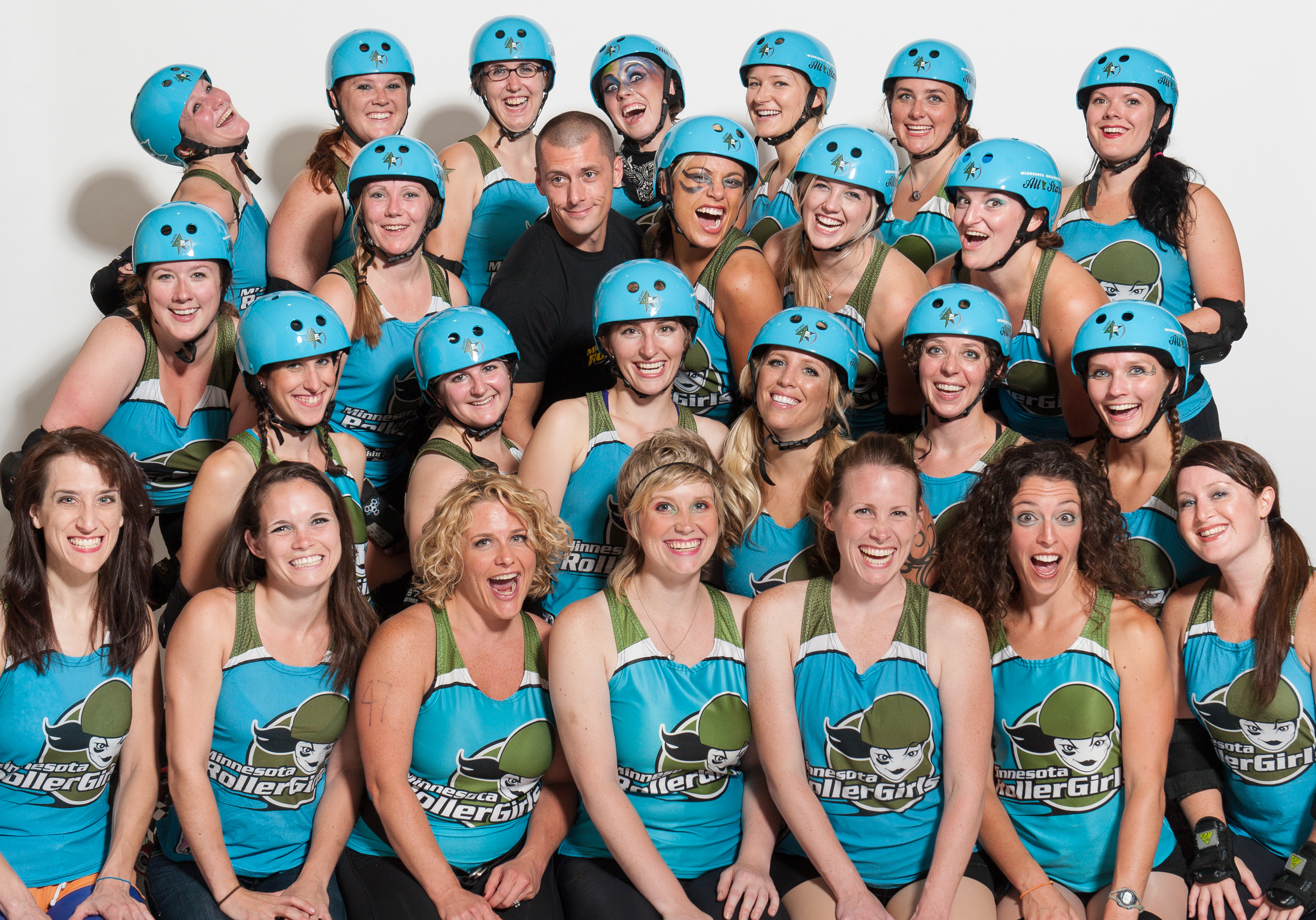
MNRG All-Stars

The Minnesota All-Stars are the league's charter all-star interleague team. This team of elite skaters, drawn from the home teams, trains together year-round and travels for sanctioned WFTDA bouts throughout the year.

The Minnesota Nice are the other half of the All-Stars program. The league's B-team are both a pool of dedicated B-team skaters and a backup personnel pool that the Minnesota All-Stars can draw from in the event of an injury or a skater leaving the program due to pregnancy or employment opportunities outside the Twin Cities. The Nice also travel to tournaments and plays in national- and international-level B-team competitions.

Separate from the charter program, the Minnesota Windchill recreation and training program maintains a bouting-ready team which plays smaller leagues and B-teams throughout the Upper Midwest.

Minnesota was one of the pioneers of the "wall" technique of blocking, where blockers engage the jammer as a unit rather than individually. Their tenacious defence has earned the nickname "the Great Wall of Saint Paul."

== WFTDA competition ==
The Minnesota All-Stars have qualified for WFTDA Playoffs and/or WFTDA Championships every year since the first Championship, the Dust Devil tournament, in 2006, at which they placed fourth overall. In 2007 and 2008, as members of the WFTDA's East Region, the All-Stars competed at the annual WFTDA Eastern Regional Tournament without advancing to the Championship.

Starting with 2009, MNRG qualified for the WFTDA North Central Regional Tournament for all four years, advancing to compete in the WFTDA Championships in 2010, 2011 and 2012. MNRG hosted the 2009 North Central Regional Tournament, the "Brawl of America", at Roy Wilkins Auditorium, at which they came in ninth place.

Minnesota has a long-standing rivalry with Chicago's Windy City Rollers, and in June 2012 the two teams played to a rare tie in WFTDA-sanctioned play. The tie (later upheld upon review by the WFTDA) resulted from a scorekeeping correction made well after the end of play, avoiding a potential overtime jam which ordinarily would have settled the score. In the 2013 revision of the Rules of Flat Track Roller Derby, it was specified that the score at the time the game-ending whistle is blown, once confirmed by the officials at the end of game time, is official and that scorekeeping errors must stand if any are discovered after the official final score is recorded.

In 2013, the Women's Flat Track Derby Association realigned its competitive divisions to emphasize teams' win–loss record and difficulty of opponents rather than organizing by regions. The Minnesota All-Stars competed at Division 1 Playoffs during the era of the Divisional system. When the Second Regional Era begins in 2023, Minnesota will compete in the North America East region along with rivals Madison Roller Derby, Windy City Rollers, and Arch Rival Roller Derby.

In 2018 the league declined invitation to the WFTDA Playoffs in A Coruña, Spain, citing the cost of air travel to the city.

=== Rankings ===
Minnesota Roller Derby plays in the WFTDA North America Northeast (NAE) region.

| Season | Final ranking | Playoffs | Championship |
|---|---|---|---|
| 2006 | 6 WFTDA | — | 4 |
| 2007 | 11 WFTDA | R2 E | DNQ |
| 2008 | 4 E | 11 E | DNQ |
| 2009 | 7 NC | 9 NC | DNQ |
| 2010 | 2 NC | 2 NC | R1 |
| 2011 | 2 NC | 2 NC | QF |
| 2012 | 2 NC | 1 NC | QF |
| 2013 | 17 WFTDA | 4 D1 | DNQ |
| 2014 | 7 WFTDA | 3 D1 | R1 D1 |
| 2015 | 12 WFTDA | 3 D1 | R1 D1 |
| 2016 | 10 WFTDA | 2 D1 | R1 D1 |
| 2017 | 17 WFTDA | 4 D1 | CR D1 |
| 2018 | 17 WFTDA | DNP | DNQ |
| 2019 | 39 WFTDA | | |
| 2020 | 39 WFTDA | | |
| 2023 | 6 WFTDA NAE | | |
| 2024 | 7 WFTDA NAE | | |

- CR = consolation round
- DNP = did not play

=== Interleague bouting record ===
Although the Minnesota home teams occasionally play against other leagues, the majority of their bouts are played by their all-star interleague team.

Partial travel team bouting history through November 2011
| Date | Opponent | Location | Score | WFTDA |
|---|---|---|---|---|
| November 12, 2011 | Texas Rollergirls | Denver, CO | 108-141 | Yes |
| November 11, 2011 | Charm City Roller Girls | Denver, CO | 160-121 | Yes |
| October 9, 2011 | Windy City Rollers | Indianapolis, IN | 100-123 | Yes |
| October 8, 2011 | Detroit Derby Girls | Indianapolis, IN | 127-106 | Yes |
| October 7, 2011 | Mad Rollin' Dolls | Indianapolis, IN | 218-81 | Yes |
| August 6, 2011 | Philly Roller Girls | Philadelphia, PA | 84-101 | Yes |
| July 17, 2011 | Demolition City Roller Derby | Nashville, TN | 221-28 | Yes |
| July 16, 2011 | Nashville Roller Girls | Nashville, TN | 130-84 | Yes |
| May 22, 2011 | Windy City Rollers | Milwaukee, WI | 105-172 | Yes |
| May 21, 2011 | Brewcity Bruisers | Milwaukee, WI | 142-66 | Yes |
| April 2, 2011 | Naptown Roller Girls | St. Paul, MN | 111-95 | Yes |
| March 5, 2011 | DC Rollergirls | St. Paul, MN | 170-33 | Yes |
| February 5, 2011 | Tucson Roller Derby | St. Paul, MN | 161-52 | Yes |
| January 29, 2011 | Mad Rollin' Dolls | St. Paul, MN | 196-74 | Yes |
| November 5, 2010 | Charm City Roller Girls | Chicago, IL | 119-249 | Yes |
| September 12, 2010 | Windy City Rollers | Green Bay, WI | 83-132 | Yes |
| September 11, 2010 | Mad Rollin' Dolls | Green Bay, WI | 119-107 | Yes |
| September 10, 2010 | Omaha Rollergirls | Green Bay, WI | 144-41 | Yes |
| September 10, 2010 | Detroit Derby Girls | Green Bay, WI | 118-99 | Yes |
| August 21, 2010 | Sacred City Derby Girls | Sacramento, CA | 202-57 | Yes |
| July 31, 2010 | Dallas Derby Devils | Dallas, TX | 73-113 | Yes |
| June 27, 2010 | Providence Roller Derby | Philadelphia, PA | 131-127 | Yes |
| June 26, 2010 | Tampa Bay Derby Darlins | Philadelphia, PA | 98-96 | Yes |
| May 22, 2010 | Pikes Peak Derby Dames | Colorado Springs, CO | 144-113 | Yes |
| December 19, 2009 | Sioux Falls Roller Dollz | Saint Paul, MN | 180-44 | Yes |
| November 21, 2009 | Hammer City Roller Girls | Saint Paul, MN | 195-46 | Yes |
| October 17, 2009 | Carolina Rollergirls | Saint Paul, MN | 105-69 | Yes |
| September 20, 2009 | Grand Raggidy Roller Girls | Saint Paul, MN | 91-75 | Yes |
| September 19, 2009 | North Star Roller Girls | Saint Paul, MN | 61-76 | Yes |
| September 18, 2009 | Windy City Rollers | Saint Paul, MN | 25-155 | Yes |
| August 29, 2009 | Houston Roller Derby | Houston, TX | 76-103 | Yes |
| June 28, 2009 | CT RollerGirls | Philadelphia, PA | 123-56 | Yes |
| June 27, 2009 | Brewcity Bruisers | Philadelphia, PA | 87-74 | Yes |
| April 25, 2009 | Grand Raggidy Roller Girls | Grand Rapids, MI | 87-76 | Yes |
| November 22, 2008 | Mad Rollin' Dolls | Saint Paul, MN | 89-87 | Yes |
| October 18, 2008 | Northwest Arkansas Roller Derby | Saint Paul, MN | 156-46 | Yes |
| October 11, 2008 | Providence Roller Derby | Madison, WI | 143-16 | Yes |
| October 10, 2008 | Mad Rollin' Dolls | Madison, WI | 67-143 | Yes |
| | Cincinnati Rollergirls | Madison, WI | 58-89 | Yes |
| September 12, 2008 | Denver Roller Dolls | Denver, CO | 57-89 | Yes |
| August 16, 2008 | Windy City Rollers | Chicago, IL | 18-206 | Yes |
| May 11, 2008 | Bay Area Derby Girls | | 25-127 | Yes |
| | Houston Roller Derby | | 97-83 | Yes |
| May 10, 2008 | OC Roller Girls | | 43-114 | Yes |
| | Rose City Rollers | | 43-114 | Yes |
| December 8, 2007 | Charm City Roller Girls | Saint Paul, MN | 69-73 | Yes |
| December 8, 2007 | Arizona Roller Derby (Tent City Terrors) | Saint Paul, MN | 87-24 | Yes |
| October 13, 2007 | Sioux Falls Roller Dollz | Sioux Falls, SD | 180-47 | No |
| September 15, 2007 | Kansas City Roller Warriors | Kansas City, MO | 84-122 | Yes |
| August 18, 2007 | Detroit Derby Girls | WFTDA Eastern Regional Tournament (Columbus, OH) | 77-99 | Yes |
| December 9, 2006 | No Coast Derby Girls (Mad Maxines) | Lincoln, NE | 205-28 | Yes |
| November 11, 2006 | Ohio Roller Girls | Saint Paul, MN | 142-55 | Yes |
| October 21, 2006 | Mad Rollin' Dolls (Dairyland Dolls) | Madison, WI | 80-96 | Yes |
| September 16, 2006 | Tampa Bay Derby Darlins | Tampa Bay, FL | 139-66 | Yes |
| September 2, 2006 | Mad Rollin' Dolls (Dairyland Dolls) | Bumbershoot Invitational (Seattle, WA) | 50-96 | Yes |
| | Rat City Rollergirls | | 24-46 | Yes |
| | Bay Area Derby Girls | | 53-29 | Yes |
| | Carolina Rollergirls | | 55-35 | Yes |
| February 25, 2006 | Tucson Roller Derby (Tucson Saddletramps) | Dust Devil Tournament 2006 (Tucson, AZ) | 75-136 | Yes |
| | Arizona Roller Derby (Tent City Terrors) | | 88-115 | Yes |
| | Kansas City Roller Warriors | | 120-79 | Yes |
| November 8, 2005 | Carolina Rollergirls | Raleigh, NC | 126-136 | Yes |
| November 8, 2005 | Carolina Rollergirls | Saint Paul, MN | 237-173 | Yes |

== MNRD in the community ==
Minnesota Roller Derby has been featured in numerous local media outlets, such as the Star Tribune, the Pulse of the Twin Cities, vita.mn, Minnesota Public Radio, and the City Pages, and were briefly featured in a Coca-Cola/NASCAR national ad campaign. Emergence Pictures produced the film Minnesota Mean, a documentary following six of the players. This film premiered April 15, 2023.

Minnesota Roller Derby is sponsored by a variety of local and national companies, including: The Onion, Minnesota Public Radio 89.3: The Current, Ultra Creative, Archetype Design, Saint Paul Athletic Club, Fiant Dental, and Pizza Lucé, among others.

Minnesota All-Stars Lynn "Juke Boxx" Klass and Melissa "Medusa" Arnold represented the United States on Team USA at the 2011 Roller Derby World Cup. In 2014, Juke Boxx returned to the Team USA roster, joined by Dana "Second Hand Smoke" Noss, for the 2014 Roller Derby World Cup.

== See also ==
- North Star Roller Derby, a nearby roller derby league in Minneapolis, Minnesota.
- Twin Cities Roller Derby, a nearby all-gender roller derby league (formerly known as Minnesota Men's Roller Derby).
