= North Star Roller Derby =

Roller derby league

- Metro area: Minneapolis
- Country: United States
- Founded: 2006
- Teams: Supernovas (A team); Northern Lights (B team); Bangers; Delta Delta Di; Kilmores; Violent Friends
- Track type(s): Flat
- Venue: Quincy Hall
- Affiliations: WFTDA
- Org. type: Non-Profit
- Website: northstarrollerderby.com

North Star Roller Derby (NSRD) is a non-profit women's flat track roller derby league based in Minneapolis, Minnesota. North Star plays its home games at Quincy Hall in Northeast Minneapolis, and is a member of the Women's Flat Track Derby Association (WFTDA). It is one of two active roller derby leagues in the Minneapolis-St. Paul area, along with Minnesota Roller Derby.

In June 2017, the league announced it had updated its name from "North Star Roller Girls" to "North Star Roller Derby".

== Organization and teams ==
former league logo

North Star Roller Derby was formed in June 2006 from the former TC Rollers organization. North Star is a nonprofit Limited Liability Company (LLC), formed pursuant to the laws of the State of Minnesota. Skaters are not paid to play, and referees, announcers, and support staff are all volunteers. North Star is committed to partnering with local businesses and charitable organizations in an effort to strengthen and support the community at large.

North Star Roller Derby has four home teams: the Bangers, Delta Delta Di, the Kilmores, and the Violent Friends. North Star also fields two traveling teams which compete against teams from other leagues, the Supernovas (A team) and the Northern Lights (B team), composed of skaters from all four league teams.

== Results ==
=== 2015-2016 home season results ===
Bout Schedule	Match-up 1/Results	Match up 2/Results
November 14, 2015	Banger Sisters (n/a) vs Kilmore Girls (n/a)	Delta Delta Di (n/a) vs Violent Femmes (n/a)
December 5, 2015	Banger Sisters (n/a) vs Violent Femmes (n/a)	Kilmore Girls (n/a) vs Forx Roller Derby (n/a)
January 9, 2016	Kilmore Girls (n/a) vs Violent Femmes (n/a)	Delta Delta Di (n/a) vs Mankato Area Roller Derby (n/a)
January 30, 2016	Banger Sisters (n/a) vs Delta Delta Di (n/a)	Violent Femmes (n/a) vs SCAR Dolls (n/a)
February 20, 2016	Delta Delta Di (n/a) vs Kilmore Girls (n/a)	Banger Sisters (n/a) vs Chippewa Valley Roller Girls (n/a)
March 12, 2016 Championship	Delta Delta Di (n/a) vs. Violent Femmes (n/a) (3rd Place)	Kilmore Girls (n/a) vs Banger Sisters (n/a) (1st Place)

=== 2013-2014 home season results ===
Bout Schedule	Match-up 1/Results	Match-up 2/Results
October 5, 2013	Delta Delta Di (95) vs Violent Femmes (96)	Banger Sisters (219) vs Kilmore Girls (69)
November 23, 2013	Kilmore Girls (47) vs Violent Femmes (179)	Banger Sisters (135) vs Delta Delta Di (64)
January 18, 2014	Delta Delta Di (180) vs Kilmore Girls (67)	Banger Sisters (81) vs Violent Femmes (139)
February 22, 2014; Championship	Delta Delta Di (163) vs Kilmore Girls (71) (3rd Place)	Banger Sisters (181) vs Violent Femmes (72) (1st Place)

=== 2012-2013 home season results ===
Bout Schedule	Match-up 1/Results	Match-up 2/Results
October 20, 2012	Delta Delta Di (113) vs Banger Sisters (63)	Violent Femmes (137) vs Kilmore Girls (22)
November 17, 2012	Violent Femmes (121) vs Banger Sisters (31)	Delta Delta Di (88) vs Kilmore Girls (50)
December 8, 2012	Violent Femmes (71) vs Delta Delta Di (80)	Banger Sisters (110) vs Kilmore Girls (70)
January 5, 2013	Banger Sisters (91) vs Delta Delta Di (103)	Violent Femmes (93) vs Kilmore Girls (52
February 22, 2013; Championships	Delta Delta Di (53) vs Violent Femmes (76) (1st Place)	Kilmore Girls (76) vs Banger Sisters (105) (3rd Place)

=== 2013 interleague season results ===
North Star Roller Derby supports two interleague travel teams. The WFTDA Charter team, the Supernovas, bout to maintain eligibility for WFTDA rankings and tournaments. The B-team, the Northern Lights, competes against other B-level teams in bouts and tournaments that maintain and support athletic development although they do not count for rankings. Both travel teams work and train together.

Bout Schedule	Supernovas Match-up/Results
June 2, 2013	(141) vs Suburbia Roller Derby Suburban Brawl (242) at Midwest Brewhaha (Milwaukee, WI)
May 31, 2013	Supernovas (142) vs Old Capitol City Roller Girls All Stars (222) at Midwest Brewhaha (Milwaukee, WI)
April 20, 2013	Supernovas (375) at Mississippi Valley Mayhem All-Stars (50) (La Crosse, WI)
March 30, 2013	Supernovas (124) vs Fargo Moorhead Derby Girls Northern Pains (148) (Minneapolis, MN)
February 2, 2013	Supernovas (194) vs Des Moines Derby Dames All Stars (92) (Minneapolis, MN)

Additional game records and stats are available at Flat Track Stats.

Bout Schedule	Northern Lights Match-up/Results
May 18, 2013	Northern Lights (509) vs Williston WreckHers (44) at Rumble in the Valley (Grand Forks, ND)
May 18, 2013	Northern Lights (362) vs Fargo Moorhead Derby Girls Furies (82) at Rumble in the Valley (Grand Forks, ND)
May 18, 2013	Northern Lights (322) vs St Cloud Area Roller (SCAR) Dolls Travel Team (88) at Rumble in the Valley (Grand Forks, ND) (For 1st Place)
March 30, 2013	Northern Lights (202) vs Fargo Moorhead Derby Girls Furies (29) (Minneapolis, MN)
February 2, 2013	Northern Lights (93) vs Des Moines Derby Dames Crash Test Dolls (58) (Minneapolis, MN)

Additional game records and stats are available at Flat Track Stats.

== WFTDA competition ==
Supernovas Team Logo

In sanctioned WFTDA play, North Star is represented by the Supernovas. North Star first competed at WFTDA Playoffs at the 2009 WFTDA North Central Regional Tournament, entering as the eighth seed and finishing in fifth place with an 85-43 victory over Arch Rival Roller Girls from St. Louis. In 2010, North Star returned to the regional playoff as the sixth seed, and finished in seventh place, capped by a 138-84 win over the Brewcity Bruisers of Milwaukee.

=== Rankings ===
WFTDA Member leagues are ranked internationally. Leagues rankings are updated monthly. NSRD plays in the North America Northeast (NAE) region as well as the Geographically Unrestricted Region (GUR).

Season	Final ranking	Playoffs	Championship
2009	5 NC	5 NC	DNQ
2010	7 NC	7 NC	DNQ
2011	12 NC	DNQ	DNQ
2012	21 NC	DNQ	DNQ
2013	81 WFTDA	DNQ	DNQ
2014	79 WFTDA	DNQ	DNQ
2015	74 WFTDA	DNQ	DNQ
2016	73 WFTDA	DNQ	DNQ
2017	59 WFTDA	DNQ	DNQ
2018	54 WFTDA		
2019	55 WFTDA		
2020	55 WFTDA		
2021	[no ranking]		
2022	[no ranking]		
2023	37 WFTDA NAE		
2024	34 WFTDA NAE		

== NSRD in the community ==
NSRD aims to build the sport of roller derby, along with women's athletics generally.

NSRD provides multiple options for learning to skate and play roller derby. The Satellites program includes learn-to-skate and learn-to-play programs. The Cosmos recreational team includes both new and retired players.

The league is sponsored by multiple local businesses including Turbo Tim's Anything Automotive, PFund Foundation, True North Roofing, 187 Killer Pads, Indeed Brewing Company, and Metro Transit.

Members of NSRD spoke out in support of transgender athletes in 2025.
