= Madison Roller Derby =

Roller derby league

- Metro area: Madison, Wisconsin
- Country: United States
- Founded: 2004
- Teams: Dairyland Dolls (A& B teams); Team Unicorn (C team); Quad Squad; Reservoir Dolls; Unholy Rollers; Cosmic Crush
- Track type: Flat
- Venue: Alliant Energy Center
- Affiliations: WFTDA
- Org. type: 503(c)3 Non-profit
- Website: https://madisonrollerderby.org/

Madison Roller Derby (MRD), founded as "Mad Rollin' Dolls", is a women's flat-track roller derby league based in Madison, Wisconsin. Founded in 2004, Madison is a founding member of the Women's Flat Track Derby Association (WFTDA), and was the fourth league to join the fledgling organization. Since 2006, Madison has qualified for the WFTDA post-season every year, including three appearances at WFTDA Championships.

== History and league structure ==
Original Mad Rollin' Dolls logo

Mad Rollin' Dolls was started in 2004 by "Crackerjack," whose sister "Lucille Brawl" had helped found Texas Rollergirls in Austin, Texas, and "Pamdemonium." Currently, the organization has a four-team home league that competes for an annual championship. The league also has two travel teams that compete internationally. Mad Rollin' Dolls games in Madison are held at the Alliant Energy Center and have been known to sell out, with crowds of 1500 people. As a business enterprise, the league was registered in 2004 as a limited liability corporation, Mad Rollin' Dolls LLC, and converted into a non-stock corporation in 2015, as Mad Rollin' Dolls Inc.

Ahead of its fifteenth season in 2019, the league announced a rebrand as Madison Roller Derby.

=== Travel teams ===
MRD has both all-star A and B-level interleague teams, which are composed of skaters from the four home teams. These teams compete against other WFTDA and non-WFTDA leagues across the United States. The Dairyland Dolls A team competes in WFTDA-sanctioned games. Starting in 2008, the Mad Rollin' Dolls added a second travel team, Team Unicorn. Their first bout was in Hamilton, Ontario on July 26, 2008.

=== Home teams ===
MRD is composed of four home teams; the Quad Squad, the Reservoir Dolls, the Unholy Rollers and the Cosmic Crush (formerly the Vaudeville Vixens). Each year the home teams compete for the league championship, with the winner being awarded a trophy named "Leggy", fashioned from a mannequin leg with a roller skate on its foot.

League Champions by year are:

Year	Season Champion
2005	Reservoir Dolls
2006	Quad Squad
2007	Reservoir Dolls
2008	Quad Squad
2009	Vaudeville Vixens
2010	Unholy Rollers
2011	Reservoir Dolls
2012	Quad Squad
2013	Reservoir Dolls
2014	Reservoir Dolls
2015	Reservoir Dolls
2016	Quad Squad
2017	Quad Squad
2018	Quad Squad
2019	Unholy Rollers

MRD also includes a recreational league in Madison, originally known as the Mad Wreckin' Dolls and renamed Madison Wreckers Roller Derby in 2016.

== WFTDA competition ==
At the first WFTDA Championships, the 2006 Dust Devil tournament, Madison placed seventh overall. The following year at the first WFTDA Eastern Regional Tournament in Columbus, Ohio, the "Heartland Havoc" event, Madison did not get past the second round.

In October 2008 the Mad Rollin' Dolls hosted that year's East Region Playoff, "Derby in Dairyland". At that tournament, Madison won their opening game against the Minnesota Rollergirls 143–67, but then lost in the quarterfinals to Gotham Girls Roller Derby of New York, 138–70. Following a win against Grand Raggidy Roller Girls and a narrow loss to Boston Derby Dames, Madison finished the weekend in sixth place.

In 2009, now part of the North Central Region, Mad Rollin' Dolls placed second in the North Central Regional Tournament, "Brawl of America" in Saint Paul, Minnesota. At the 2009 Championships, Madison was eliminated by Boston, 104–98. At the 2010 North Central Playoffs, Madison came in third place, winning their final game 164–143 against Cincinnati Rollergirls, to again qualify for WFTDA Championships. For the second straight year, Madison was defeated in the opening round, this time by Philly Roller Girls, 213–53. In 2011, the Dairyland Dolls entered the North Central Playoffs as the sixth seed, but lost each game and finished the weekend in tenth place. In 2012, Madison entered what would be the final North Central Regional Playoff as the tenth seed, and improved on their seeding by defeating Arch Rival Roller Girls in the seventh place game, 217–119.

In 2013, the WFTDA changed its playoff structure, and Madison qualified for the WFTDA Division 1 International Playoff tournament in Asheville, North Carolina as the sixth seed, ultimately finishing in ninth place with a 265–195 victory over the Columbia Quadsquad. As the seventh seed in Charleston for Division 1 Playoffs in 2014, the Dairyland Dolls improved on their seeding with upset victories over Boston (176–175) and the Naptown Roller Girls of Indianapolis (166–101) to finish in fifth place. At the 2015 Division 1 Playoff in Tucson, Madison again pulled rankings upsets (this time over Arizona Roller Derby and Baltimore's Charm City Roller Girls)to improve their position over the weekend, going from the ninth seed to sixth place.

For the first time since 2008, Mad Rollin' Dolls hosted a WFTDA Playoff tournament in September 2016. Held at the Alliant Energy Center, the Dairyland Dolls also competed at the Division 1 tournament, where they entered as the tenth seed and left in seventh place. With upset victories over No Coast Derby Girls (Lincoln, Nebraska) and Chicago's Windy City Rollers, Madison had achieved the most D1 playoff upsets in WFTDA history. In 2017, Madison was the eleventh seed at Division 1 Playoffs in Seattle, but lost 225–83 to host Rat City Rollergirls and 241–140 to Bay Area Derby and finished out of the medals.

In 2018, MRD missed the cutoff for WFTDA Playoffs, instead qualifying for the first WFTDA Continental Cup, the 2018 North America East edition in Kalamazoo, Michigan, at which they were the second seed. MRD finished the weekend in fourth place, dropping the bronze medal game to Team United Roller Derby by a score of 189–131.

In 2019, MRD again qualified for the WFTDA Continental Cup North America East, held in Lancaster, Pennsylvania, as the sixth seed. MRD defeated Ohio Roller Derby 159–132 before falling to Detroit Roller Derby 258-146 and Tampa Roller Derby 182–116.

=== Rankings ===
As a member of the Women's Flat Track Derby Association (WFTDA), the Mad Rollin' Dolls were originally member of the WFTDA's East Region, but by the end of 2008 were moved to the North Central Region, and were ranked sixth in the North Central at the end of 2012. The WFTDA moved away from regions and into a division system in 2013, and MRD consistently placed in WFTDA Division 1 Playoffs for the duration of that format.

Season	Final ranking	Playoffs	Championship
2006	5 WFTDA	—	7
2007	9 WFTDA	R2 E	DNQ
2008	2 NC	6 E	DNQ
2009	3 NC	2 NC	R1
2010	3 NC	3 NC	R1
2011	10 NC	10 NC	DNQ
2012	6 NC	7 NC	DNQ
2013	31 WFTDA	9 D1	DNQ
2014	26 WFTDA	5 D1	DNQ
2015	42 WFTDA	6 D1	DNQ
2016	33 WFTDA	7 D1	DNQ
2017	36 WFTDA	CR D1	DNQ
2018	38 WFTDA	4 CC NA East	NA

- CR = consolation round
