= Chicago Outfit Roller Derby =

American roller derby league

- Metro area: Chicago, IL
- Country: United States
- Founded: 2007
- Dissolved: 2022
- Teams: Syndicate (A team); Shade Brigade; Shakedown
- Track type(s): Flat
- Venue: Cicero Stadium
- Affiliations: WFTDA
- Org. type: Non-Profit
- Website: www.chicagooutfitrollerderby.com

Chicago Outfit Roller Derby (commonly referred to as The Outfit) was a women's flat-track roller derby league based in Chicago, Illinois. Founded in 2007, the Chicago Outfit was a member of the Women's Flat Track Derby Association (WFTDA).

In 2022 Chicago Outfit Roller Derby merged with the DuPage Derby Dames to form a new league called Chicago-Style Roller Derby. Chicago-Style Roller Derby currently plays at Coachlite Skate Center in Roselle, Illinois.

== History and league structure ==
The Outfit formed in 2007, after the collapse of another roller derby organization in Chicago, the Chi-Town Sirens. While many of the former Sirens joined "the other" Chicago league, the Windy City Rollers, the rest launched the Outfit as a new organization that only played against other league's teams, rather than creating its own home league.

In September 2009, the Chicago Outfit joined the WFTDA Apprentice Program, and became full members of the Women's Flat Track Derby Association (WFTDA) on June 17, 2010.

The Outfit consisted of three travel teams. The Syndicate was the Outfit's A-team, representing the league in bouts counting toward WFTDA rankings. The Outfit added the Shade Brigade, the B-level team, in January 2009. The Shade Brigade typically competed against lower-ranked WFTDA leagues or the B-teams of leagues that had higher rankings. Due to the large number of new skaters joining the Outfit at the end of 2010, the league created an additional, C-level team called the Shakedown for newer skaters. The Shakedown began competing in August 2011. Chicago Outfit home games were held at Cicero Stadium.

== WFTDA competition ==
The Outfit first qualified for WFTDA Playoffs in 2011, entering the WFTDA North Central Regional Tournament as the ninth seed and finishing in fifth place, by defeating Arch Rival of St. Louis (to whom they lost their opening game on day 1 of the tournament), 153-113. In 2012, the Outfit entered the North Central Playoff as the eighth seed but finished in tenth, culminating with a 180-166 loss to Cincinnati Rollergirls. As the ninth seed at the 2013 Division 1 Playoff in Salem, the Outfit lost all three of their games to finish in tenth place. In 2014, the Outfit competed at the Division 2 Playoff in Kitchener-Waterloo, Ontario as the fifth seed and finished in seventh place, with a 189-150 victory over Demolition City Roller Derby. At the 2015 Division 2 Playoff in Detroit, the Outfit had their best result to date, entering as the sixth seed yet finishing in fourth place, after a loss to Naptown Roller Girls 190-107. At the 2016 Division 2 Playoff in Wichita, the ninth-seeded Outfit defeated Carolina Rollergirls 249-173 to finish in ninth place.

=== Rankings ===
Season	Final ranking	Playoffs	Championship
2010	9 NC	DNQ	DNQ
2011	5 NC	5 NC	DNQ
2012	10 NC	10 NC	DNQ
2013	49 WFTDA	10 D1	DNQ
2014	47 WFTDA	7 D2	DNQ
2015	40 WFTDA	4 D2	DNQ
2016	67 WFTDA	9 D2	DNQ
2017	95 WFTDA	DNQ	DNQ
2018	124 WFTDA	DNQ	DNQ

== In the community ==
The Outfit was a democratic league, run by the skaters and for the skaters. The league has a long history of contributing charitably to several other non-profit organizations, including the Howard Brown Health Center, Ignite the Spirit, Family of Moxie Mayhem, Derby News Network, Help Tequila, Girls Rock! Chicago, the American Cancer Society, and Rape, Abuse, and Incest National Network (RAINN). The Outfit also coached the Chicago Riots, which is a junior roller derby league consisting of skaters ages 10 to 17.

In 2013, members of The Outfit appeared on The Queen Latifah Show. Kent Smith, member of the Ohio House of Representatives, volunteers as an announcer for the Outfit.
