= Arch Rival Roller Derby =

Roller derby league

- Metro area: St. Louis, Missouri
- Country: United States
- Founded: 2005
- Teams: All-Stars (A team); Arch Nemesis (B team); Arch Enemy (C Team); Fleur Delinquents (D team); Botanical Guardians; Jewel Boxers; Fabulous Foxes; Lafayette Scare
- Track type: Flat
- Venue: Midwest Sport Hockey Complex in Ballwin, MO
- Affiliations: WFTDA
- Org. type: skater-owned
- Website: archrivalrollerderby.com

Arch Rival Roller Derby, or ARCH, is a women's flat-track roller derby league in St. Louis, Missouri. Founded in 2005, Arch Rival is a member of the Women's Flat Track Derby Association (WFTDA).

== History ==
Arch Rival original logo

Arch Rival Roller Derby was founded as "Arch Rival Roller Girls" (ARRG) in 2005 by Sarah Kate Buckles, who skates as Mary Manglin'. The league was trained from January 2006 through May 2007 by coach Ken Watts, AKA "Papa Wheelie." In 2006 ARRG competed locally as 2 teams, each represented by one of the league colors, pink and black. In 2007, ARRG expanded to three home teams, the Stunt Devils, the M-80s and the Smashinistas. A travel team, composed of select skaters, played Arch Rival's first WFTDA-sanctioned game against the Windy City Rollers of Chicago on January 5, 2008, a 95-49 Windy City win. In May 2007, Papa Wheelie resigned, and ARCH now coach themselves using a committee/rotation system drawing from the experience and strength of the veteran skaters and captains.

Arch Rival Roller Derby is an organization consisting of more than 60 active skaters and volunteers who manage and operate the league for and by themselves in accordance with the goals and mission of the WFTDA. ARRG leadership in 2008 consisted of nine elected members of the board of directors and six skaters who serve as elected captains and co-captains of the three teams.

In April 2016, Arch Rival announced its name change from Arch Rival Rollergirls to Arch Rival Roller Derby, to better offer opportunities for trans women, intersex women, and genderqueer members.

In November 2020, it was announced that Arch Rival would be launching a Hall of Fame, inducting five retired skaters, one official, and one non-skating league volunteer each year.

== League Structure ==
=== Travel teams ===
- All Stars (A)
- Arch Nemesis (B)
- Arch Enemy (C)
- Fleur Delinquents (D)

=== Home teams ===
- Botanical Guardians
- Fabulous Foxes
- Jewel Boxers
- Lafayette Scare

Since 2017, the league has operated a junior roller derby program, St. Louis Junior Derby. This is aimed at children aged 7–17 and is associated with the Junior Roller Derby Association (JRDA).

== WFTDA Competition ==
Arch Rival was announced as a member of the Women's Flat Track Derby Association in December 2007, initially as a member of the East Region.

On September 20, 2008, the ARRG travel team won Fall Brawl, a regional tournament hosted by the Fort Wayne Derby Girls. ARRG, ranked 44 by Flat Track Stats, came into the double-elimination tournament a rankings underdog, and defeated the higher-ranked Ohio Roller Girls (32) and the Cincinnati Rollergirls (20) in early rounds, and came from behind to beat Grand Raggidy Roller Girls in an 86–71 victory.

Arch Rival has made regular appearances at WFTDA Playoffs, including WFTDA Championships in both 2015 and 2016. At the 2017 Division 1 Playoff in Dallas, Arch Rival won their quarterfinal against Queen City Roller Girls 339–123 to qualify for Championships, but then lost their semifinal to Texas Rollergirls 209–199. They then finished in third place by beating Minnesota RollerGirls 186–91. At the 2017 Championships, Arch Rival won their opening game against London Rollergirls 225–82, but lost their quarterfinal to Rose City Rollers 237–109. Arch Rival finished their weekend by defeating Crime City Rollers in the consolation round, 220–160.

In 2018, Arch Rival took first place at the WFTDA Playoff in A Coruña, Spain, by winning the title game 342–149 over Crime City; Arch Rival jammer Bricktator was named tournament MVP. As the fifth seed at the 2018 Championships in New Orleans, Arch Rival lost their quarterfinal to fourth seed Denver Roller Derby, 204–134, but ended their weekend on a high note with a consolation round victory over Texas, 122–92.

In 2023, Arch Rival's B team, Arch Nemesis, became the second WFTDA sanctioned travel team within the league.

In 2024, Arch Rival took second place at international WFTDA Championships in Portland, Oregon.

In 2025, Arch Rival announced that their C-team, previously named the Fleur-de-Linquents and renamed as Arch Enemy, would become the third sanctioned WFTDA team. A newly created D-team inherited the Fleur-de-Linquents name.

=== Rankings ===
Season	Final ranking	Playoffs	Championship
2008	NR	DNQ	DNQ
2009	8 NC	6 NC	DNQ
2010	11 NC	10 NC	DNQ
2011	6 NC	6 NC	DNQ
2012	8 NC	8 NC	DNQ
2013	20 WFTDA	6 D1	DNQ
2014	23 WFTDA	6 D1	DNQ
2015	10 WFTDA	3 D1	R1 D1
2016	8 WFTDA	3 D1	QF D1
2017	6 WFTDA	3 D1	QF D1
2018	5 WFTDA	1	CR
2019	5 WFTDA	Bye	4th Place
2020-2022	Seasons cancelled due to COVID-19	N/A	N/A
2023	2 WFTDA GUR	N/A	N/A
2024	2 WFTDA GUR	1 NE	2nd Place

- CR = consolation round

== In the media ==
The Arch Rival Roller Derby team has been featured extensively in St. Louis's media. They have been featured in local print, TV and radio news. Additionally, various league members have been featured individually in the media. Arch Rival Roller Girl Riddle Lynn was featured on the debut of the TLC show My First Home in April 2007.

In February 2009 the Arch Rival Rollergirls took part in a music video shoot for the Breeders single "Fate To Fatal".
