= Sioux City Roller Dames =

Roller derby team in Iowa

- Metro area: Sioux City, Iowa
- Country: United States
- Founded: 2008
- Dissolved: 2016
- Track type: Flat
- Venue: Long Lines Family Rec Center
- Affiliations: WFTDA

The Sioux City Roller Dames (SCRD) were a roller derby team based in Sioux City, Iowa.

Founded in 2008, the team originally competed in the Upper Midwest Division of the regional Women's Flat Track Roller Derby League. The league played its first bouts, away and then at home, against the Sioux Falls Roller Dollz in October 2008. In 2010, the Roller Dames won the "Rolling Along The River" tournament, beating the Fargo-Moorhead Derby Girls in the final.

Sioux City also supported the creation of a new league in Norfolk, Nebraska, while three of the Roller Dames' members attracted attention by skating across South Dakota to raise money for charity.

The league was accepted into the Women's Flat Track Derby Association (WFTDA) Apprentice Program in April 2011, and became a full member of the WFTDA in March 2012.

The Roller Dames shut down in December 2016 due to lack of players.

== WFTDA rankings ==
Season	Final ranking	Playoffs	Championship
2012	26 SC	DNQ	DNQ
2013	98 WFTDA	DNQ	DNQ
2014	104 WFTDA	DNQ	DNQ
2015	81 WFTDA	DNQ	DNQ
2016	206 WFTDA	DNQ	DNQ
