= Des Moines Derby Dames =

American roller derby league

- Metro area: Des Moines, IA
- Country: United States
- Founded: 2009
- Dissolved: 2015
- Teams: Des Moines Derby Dames (travel); Crash Test Dolls
- Track type: Flat
- Venue: 7 Flags Event Center
- Affiliations: WFTDA

The Des Moines Derby Dames (D3) were a women's flat-track roller derby league based in Des Moines, Iowa. The league was founded in 2009 and was the second roller derby league in the Des Moines area. The Des Moines Derby Dames were a member of the Women's Flat Track Derby Association (WFTDA).

The league ceased operations at the end of 2014.

== History and organization ==
Des Moines Derby Dames was composed of two teams: the Des Moines Derby Dames and the Crash Test Dolls. The Des Moines Derby Dames team was considered the all-star travel team for the league.

The Des Moines Derby Dames skated their first competitive bout on April 3, 2010 in a loss to Iowa City's Old Capitol City Roller Girls. D3 played their first home bout in front of a sold-out crowd at the Val Air Ballroom in West Des Moines. After consideration for their fans, D3 decided to move to the 7 Flags Event Center in Clive, Iowa.

The Dames highlighted their season with a victory at home over the Omaha Rollergirls AAA, the "B" team for the Omaha Rollergirls. On October 5, 2010, the Des Moines Derby Dames joined 9 other leagues around the world as a Women's Flat Track Derby Association Apprentice League. On September 1, 2011, the Des Moines Derby Dames graduated from Apprentice status to become the first full WFTDA league in the state of Iowa.

The Des Moines Derby Dames league experienced rapid growth after the completion of their first competitive season. In order to get more skaters actively bouting, a second home team was created. The team was named the Crash Test Dolls in a fan voting contest. The Crash Test Dolls were officially formed in late 2010 and began competition in the 2011 season.

The first bout of the 2011 campaign was played at the Jacobson Exhibition Center at the Iowa State Fairgrounds. In that bout, the largest crowd to ever watch roller derby in Iowa saw the Des Moines Derby Dames defeat the Quad City Rollers, 187-67. This bout also featured the debut of the first men's roller derby team in Des Moines: Your Mom Men's Derby. The Des Moines Derby Dames continued to sell out games and build their fan base in the Des Moines area. The 2011 season was highlighted by a win over the Kansas City Roller Warriors Plan B and a win over the Babe City Rollers, D3's first win over a WFTDA league.

The Des Moines Derby Dames entered their first full season as a WFTDA league in February 2012. The team scheduled games against Omaha Rollergirls and the Chicago Outfit Roller Derby Shade Brigade, among others. A bout was also staged against the Mid Iowa Rollers, marking the first time the two Des Moines leagues had met. Mid Iowa defeated the Des Moines Derby Dames, 206-99. The Des Moines Derby Dames record in 2012 was 6-7. The Crash Test Dolls finished the year with a record of 8-3. In August 2012, the Des Moines Derby Dames were granted full non-profit status and were designated a 501 (c)(3) organization. The Des Moines Derby Dames often gave portions of profits from home bouts to area charities such as the Girl Scouts of the USA, Youth Emergency Services and Shelter, and Habitat for Humanity.

In 2013, the Des Moines Derby Dames looked to rebuild after the retirements of key players. The team posted a 4-4 record in the spring season, including a win over the Omaha Rollergirls, 182-152. The Crash Test Dolls won six games in a row to finish the spring season with a 6-2 record.

In March 2013, the WFTDA announced that the Des Moines Derby Dames had been selected to host the first of two inaugural Division 2 Playoffs. The tournament was held August 16–18 at the Iowa Events Center in Des Moines. Ten teams from around the United States participated in the tournament for the opportunity to play for the Division 2 championship at the WFTDA Championships in Milwaukee in November 2013.

== WFTDA rankings ==
Season	Final ranking	Playoffs	Championship
2012	21 SC	DNQ	DNQ
2013	86 WFTDA	DNQ	DNQ
2014	70 WFTDA	DNQ	DNQ

== League dissolution and merger ==
Due to dwindling numbers of skaters and financial restrictions, the Des Moines Derby Dames Board of Directors voted to dissolve the teams and league at the end of 2014. With the hopes of building a larger, more competitive team in Des Moines, the Des Moines Derby Dames league members were absorbed by former rival league, Team United Roller Derby. In late 2015, the newly merged team would go on to become the first Iowa women's roller derby team participate in the WFTDA playoffs.
