= Big North Conference =

Big North Conference may refer to one of the following athletic conferences in the United States:

- Big North Conference (Michigan)
- Big North Conference (New Jersey)

== See also ==
- North Conference (disambiguation)
