= Burning River Roller Derby =

Roller derby league

- Metro area: Cleveland, Ohio
- Country: United States
- Founded: 2006
- Teams: All-Stars (A team); HazMat Crew (B team); Pyromaniacs (C team); Cleveland Steamers (Inactive); Hard Knockers (Inactive); Hellbombers (Inactive); Rolling Pin-Ups (Inactive)
- Track type: Flat
- Venue: CE Orr Arena, Euclid OH (Spring); Ohio Nets Sports Complex, Parma OH (Autumn)
- Affiliations: WFTDA
- Org. type: 501c3 non-profit
- Website: http://www.burningriverderby.com/

Burning River Roller Derby is a women's flat-track roller derby league based in Cleveland, Ohio. Founded in 2006, Burning River is a member of the Women's Flat Track Derby Association (WFTDA).

== History and organization ==
Burning River Roller Derby was started as Burning River Roller Girls in 2006, and joined the Women's Flat Track Derby Association (WFTDA) in December 2007.

Burning River Roller Derby has three travel teams that play against other teams from other leagues. The A team, "Burning River All-Stars", was formed in 2007 and plays WFTDA-sanctioned games for both regional and national rankings. The All-Stars ranked high enough to participate in the first-ever WFTDA Division 2 playoffs in 2013. The B team, "Burning River HazMat Crew", plays sanctioned and regulation games regionally, and the C team, "Burning River Pyromaniacs", plays very close, regional regulation games. The league also had four home teams who played each other in interleague play: the Cleveland Steamers, the Hard Knockers, the HellBombers, and the Rolling Pin-Ups.

In early 2015, Burning River announced the change of the league name from Burning River Roller Girls to Burning River Roller Derby, to place less emphasis on gender and better reflect its members. In August 2015, Burning River hosted a WFTDA Division 2 playoff tournament.

== WFTDA competition ==
In 2009 Burning River was the ninth seed at the WFTDA North Central Regional Tournament and finished in eighth place after an overtime loss to Brewcity Bruisers, 126-116. In 2013, the WFTDA changed their playoff structure, and Burning River qualified for the WFTDA Division 2 International Playoff tournament in Kalamazoo, Michigan as the ninth seed, ultimately finishing in eighth place.

=== Rankings ===
Pre-2015 BRRD logo

| Season | Final ranking | Playoffs | Championship |
|---|---|---|---|
| 2008 | 9 NC | DNQ | DNQ |
| 2009 | 9 NC | 8 NC | DNQ |
| 2010 | 14 NC | DNQ | DNQ |
| 2011 | 15 NC | DNQ | DNQ |
| 2012 | 17 NC | DNQ | DNQ |
| 2013 | 59 WFTDA | 8 D2 | DNQ |
| 2014 | 99 WFTDA | DNQ | DNQ |
| 2015 | 72 WFTDA | DNQ | DNQ |
| 2016 | 100 WFTDA | DNQ | DNQ |
| 2017 | 128 WFTDA | DNQ | DNQ |
