= Sioux Falls Roller Dollz =

Roller derby league

- Metro area: Sioux Falls, South Dakota
- Country: United States
- Founded: 2006
- Teams: Doll Starz (A team)
- Track type: Flat
- Venue: Sioux Falls Arena
- Affiliations: WFTDA
- Website: www.rollerdollz.com

Sioux Falls Roller Dollz (SFRD) is a women's flat track roller derby league based in Sioux Falls, South Dakota. Founded in 2006, the league currently consists of two teams, and two mixed teams which compete against teams from other leagues. Sioux Falls is a member of the Women's Flat Track Derby Association (WFTDA).

== History ==
The league was founded by Elizabeth "Queen Elizabitch" Nelson and Jayme "PainMaker" Nelson (no relation) in October 2006, after they watched Rollergirls on television and saw a live bout between the Mad Rollin' Dolls and the Minnesota RollerGirls. They were immediately able to recruit a group of around twenty skaters. They constituted the first league in South Dakota; when a second league, the Rushmore Rollerz, was set up, the Dollz acted as mentors to it.

The Roller Dollz joined the Women's Flat Track Derby Association in 2008, playing their first sanctioned bout against the North Star Rollergirls in January 2009.

By May 2011, the Dollz had raised an estimated $40,000 for local charities. In late 2011, they toured to England, to play the London Rollergirls, Central City Rollergirls and Lincolnshire Bombers Roller Girls. Their head coach is WWE Superstar Shayna Baszler

== WFTDA rankings ==
Season	Final ranking	Playoffs	Championship
2009	13 NC	DNQ	DNQ
2010	17 NC	DNQ	DNQ
2011	18 NC	DNQ	DNQ
2012	26 NC	DNQ	DNQ
2013	123 WFTDA	DNQ	DNQ
2014	118 WFTDA	DNQ	DNQ
2015	221 WFTDA	DNQ	DNQ
2016	293 WFTDA	DNQ	DNQ
