= GCRG =

GCRG can refer to:

- Gem City Rollergirls, from Dayton, Ohio
- Granite City Roller Girls, from Aberdeen in Scotland
