= Skyline Cup =

The Skyline Cup is a women's roller derby trophy traded between New York's Gotham Girls Roller Derby and Chicago's Windy City Rollers as a prize awarded to the victorious team whenever teams from the two leagues directly compete.

== Origins ==
The trophy was conceived and designed and commissioned by the Windy City Rollers in early 2010, in recognition of a strong intercity rivalry. The two teams' All-Star squads met in the WFTDA East Region finals in both 2007 and 2008, and in the finals of the WFTDA Championship in 2008.

Each league fields a variety of women's roller derby teams: All-Stars, B-Team, C-Team, and regular home teams. The two leagues have agreed that the trophy is 'on the line' each time any two teams from the two leagues meet in any full-length regulation public roller derby competition. The trophy is a symbol of the latest league victory, at any level of competition.

The trophy was initially awarded to Gotham Girls Roller Derby after their All-Stars' June 25, 2010 victory at the East Coast Derby Extravaganza in Feasterville, PA. The trophy was engraved to retroactively list prior meetings between the teams.

== Series History ==
- August 19, 2007 - Gotham Girls All-Stars 134, Windy City All-Stars 71

Columbus, OH. Flat track competition in the finals of the WFTDA's East Region Playoffs

- October 10, 2008 - Gotham Girls All-Stars 133, Windy City All-Stars 92

Madison, WI. Flat track competition in the finals of the WFTDA's East Region Playoffs

- November 16, 2008 -- Gotham Girls All-Stars 134, Windy City All-Stars 66

Portland, OR. Flat track competition in the finals of the WFTDA's Championship tournament

- June 25, 2010 - Gotham Girls All-Stars 191, Windy City All-Stars 50

Feasterville, PA. Flat track competition at the East Coast Derby Extravaganza.

- July 20, 2011 - Windy City Second Wind 166, Gotham Girls Wall Street Traitors 77

Chicago, IL. Flat track competition at UIC-Pavilion.

- November 19, 2011 - Gotham Girls All-Stars 214, Windy City All-Stars 94

Chicago, IL. Banked track competition at UIC-Pavilion at the Kitten Traxx Chicago Invitational.

- July 21, 2012 - Gotham Girls All-Stars 254, Windy City All-Stars 89

Austin, TX. Flat track competition at the Star of Texas Bowl, hosted by the Texas Rollergirls

- October 27, 2012 - Gotham Girls Grand Central Terminators 300, Windy City Third Coast 104

Brooklyn, NY. Flat track competition at Gotham's practice warehouse.

- October 27, 2012 - Windy City Second Wind 134, Gotham Girls Wall Street Traitors 119

Brooklyn, NY. Flat track competition at Gotham's practice warehouse. Note that this was the second bout in a double-header split, so the Windy City Rollers were considered the most recent winner of the cup.
