= Des Moines Roller Derby =

Roller derby league

- Metro area: Des Moines, Iowa
- Country: United States
- Founded: 2013
- Teams: WFTDA Charter Team; Open Division All Gender Team
- Track type(s): Flat
- Venue: MVP Sports, Des Moines
- Affiliations: WFTDA
- Org. type: 501(c)(3) Non-Profit Organization
- Website: www.desmoinesrollerderby.com

Des Moines Roller Derby (DMRD), formerly known as Team United Roller Derby (TURD), is a flat track roller derby league located in Des Moines, Iowa. It consists of two travel teams: a WFTDA charter team, and an Open Division all gender team. DMRD is a member of the Women's Flat Track Derby Association (WFTDA).

== History ==
The league was founded in early 2013, with most of its founders being former skaters for the Mid Iowa Rollers. It was coached by Mark Muse, also the coach of nearby Your Mom Men's Derby. The All Stars team saw rapid success, beating Minnesota RollerGirls' All Stars in December.

The league affiliated with the Women's Flat Track Derby Association (WFTDA), completing its Apprentice Program in 2014. The following year, it began taking on WFTDA Division 1 teams, nearly beating the Rocky Mountain Rollergirls.

In December 2019, the league underwent a complete rebrand, changing its name, logo, coaching, and leadership structure (including Board of Directors/Executive Board) to better suit its mission. The league is currently skater-coached.

== WFTDA Competition ==
By 2015, Team United had absorbed most of the skaters from the Des Moines Derby Dames. Later that year, Team United qualified for the WFTDA Division 1 Playoff in Tucson, and took seventh place, with a 191–165 victory over Charm City Roller Girls. For the 2016 Madison Division 1 Playoff Team United came in as the fifth seed, and finished in fifth place by defeating Helsinki Roller Derby 206–155.

In 2017, Team United did not meet the required minimum of sanctioned gameplay to be eligible for WFTDA Playoffs, although they were ranked at 26th overall at the time, and were declared ineligible for Division 1.

In 2018, Team United competed at the first WFTDA Continental Cup - North America East post-season tournament in Kalamazoo, Michigan. The team took home third place in the tournament, with a 195–131 victory over Mad Rollin' Dolls.

In 2019, Team United competed at the WFTDA Continental Cup - North America West post-season tournament in Orem, Utah. Team United lost to top-seeded Calgary Roller Derby in the team's second game, and finished the tournament in the consolation bracket.

=== Rankings ===
Season	Final ranking	Playoffs	Championship
2014	NR	N/A	DNQ
2015	28 WFTDA	7 D1	DNQ
2016	14 WFTDA	5 D1	DNQ
2017	32 WFTDA	DNQ	DNQ
2018	45 WFTDA	3 CC NA East	DNQ
2019	44 WFTDA	CR CC NA West	DNQ

- NR = no final ranking assigned this year
- DNQ = did not qualify
- CR = consolation round
