= Ohio Roller Derby =

Roller derby league

- Metro area: Columbus, Ohio
- Country: United States
- Founded: March 2005
- Teams: Ohio Roller Derby All-Stars; Gang Green
- Track type: Flat
- Venue: The Ohio State Fairgrounds
- Affiliations: WFTDA
- Org. type: LLC
- Website: ohiorollerderby.com

Ohio Roller Derby (OHRD) is a women's flat track roller derby league based in Columbus, Ohio. Founded in 2005, the league currently consists of two mixed teams which compete against teams from other leagues. Ohio Roller Derby is a founding member of the Women's Flat Track Derby Association (WFTDA).

== League history ==
Former Ohio league logo

Ohio Roller Derby was founded as the Ohio Roller Girls (OHRG) in April 2005 by Melissa "Scarlette Fury" Wallace, with the first bout held in Battelle Hall at the Greater Columbus Convention Center on April 23, 2006. In 2007, the league began holding bouts at the Lausche Building at the Ohio State Fairgrounds, by which point they were drawing roughly 1,000 fans to events.

In 2007, the league hosted the first WFTDA Eastern Regional Tournament, Heartland Havoc. Twelve teams from the East Region of the WFTDA competed, with Gotham Girls Roller Derby (New York City) winning the tournament.

In 2008, the league debuted an all-Ohio roller derby expo at the Ohio State Fair. The event returned in 2009 and 2011.

In May 2010, the league hosted the WFTDA Annual Meeting, known as Oh!con.

In 2016, the league announced a name change to "Ohio Roller Derby", to better reflect its community and its members.

Ohio Roller Derby is a skater-owned and operated organization, overseen by a board of directors that is elected by its members.

== Teams ==
For its first three seasons, OHRG had a four-team home league comprising the Band of Brawlers, the Blackeye Bullies, the Sprockettes, and the Take-Outs, which competed for a league championship called the Envy Cup, held at times at the Lausche Building at the Ohio Expo Center. Each team had a unique theme. The Brawlers were the WWII-inspired military team, the Bullies were schoolyard bullies, the Sprockettes were from space, and the Take-Outs were ninja-esque.

Beginning with the 2009 season, the league switched to an A & B team, interleague only format, consisting of the WFTDA Chartered Team (formerly All-Stars) that competes against other WFTDA leagues from around the country for rankings, and a B-team, Gang Green, that plays against other WFTDA B teams and non-WFTDA teams.

== WFTDA competition ==
Ohio's first appearance at WFTDA Playoffs was the 2007 OHRG-hosted WFTDA Eastern Regional Tournament "Heartland Havoc", at which Ohio Roller Girls were defeated in the first round by Providence Roller Derby.

Ohio Roller Girls did not qualify for WFTDA Playoffs again until 2011, when they made the WFTDA North Central Regional Tournament "Monumental Mayhem" as the tenth seed, and finished in ninth place with a victory over the Mad Rollin' Dolls of Madison, Wisconsin.

In 2012, the Ohio Roller Girls set a WFTDA record for most sanctioned victories in a season, going 20-1 in regular season play, which put them into the North Central tournament as the fifth seed. After winning their quarterfinal game against Arch Rival of St. Louis, Ohio lost to Windy City Rollers (Chicago) in their semifinal, and then to Naptown Roller Girls (Indianapolis) in the third-place game to finish the tournament in fourth. OHRG skaters Phoenix Bunz and The Smacktivist won the tournament's MVP awards for blocking and jamming, respectively.

In 2013, Ohio qualified for Division 1 Playoffs, competing at the Fort Wayne tournament in early September as the sixth seed; seeding upsets over third seed Arch Rival and second seed Montreal Roller Derby earned Ohio a spot in the tournament final, as well as their first trip to WFTDA Championships. Ohio lost the Fort Wayne final 304-134 to top-seeded Denver to finish the weekend in second place. At the Championships in Milwaukee in November, Ohio won their opening round game against Rat City Rollergirls (Seattle) 230-212, but then were eliminated by defending (and eventual repeating) champion Gotham 509-64 in the quarterfinals. Of note, even though both Ohio and Gotham are founding members of the WFTDA, this game marked the first time they had ever played each other.

At the 2014 Evansville Division 1 tournament, Ohio entered as the fifth seed, but lost to lower seeded Jacksonville Rollergirls and Steel City Roller Derby (Pittsburgh) to drop them into the ninth-place game, which they won against Houston Roller Derby 209-129. Ohio again finished in ninth place at the 2015 Dallas Division 1 tournament, this time by winning their final game against Rideau Valley of Ottawa, Ontario. For the second straight year, Ohio was a ninth-seeded team at Division 1 Playoffs in 2016, and for the third straight year finished in ninth place, in Madison, beating No Coast Derby Girls (Lincoln, Nebraska) on the third day 227-188. Ohio qualified for the WFTDA Division 2 Playoffs and Championship in 2017 as the eighth seed in Pittsburgh, and finished in tenth place.

=== Rankings ===
Season	Final ranking	Playoffs	Championship
2006	23 WFTDA	—	DNQ
2007	25 WFTDA	R1 E	DNQ
2008	7 NC	DNQ	DNQ
2009	12 NC	DNQ	DNQ
2010	13 NC	DNQ	DNQ
2011	9 NC	9 NC	DNQ
2012	5 NC	4 NC	DNQ
2013	22 WFTDA	2 D1	QF D1
2014	22 WFTDA	9 D1	DNQ
2015	31 WFTDA	9 D1	DNQ
2016	36 WFTDA	9 D1	DNQ
2017	46 WFTDA	N/A	10 D2

== Community involvement ==
From 2008 through 2014, OHRG was an official partner with the City of Columbus Neighborhood Pride Program, designed to improve neighborhoods through increased activism and inter-community involvement. As part of celebrations of the Columbus city bicentennial in 2012, Columbus Alive named the first public games of the league as the 2006 entry in its "200 Arts and Cultural Moments that Shaped the City’s History". Mayor Michael B. Coleman blew the opening whistle at an OHRG event in March 2012, in recognition of it being an official 200 Columbus Event.
