= Cincinnati Rollergirls =

Roller derby league in Ohio, US

- Metro area: Cincinnati, Ohio
- Country: United States
- Founded: 2005
- Teams: Black Sheep (A team); Violent Lambs (B team)
- Track type: Flat
- Venue: Schmidt Memorial Field House
- Affiliations: WFTDA
- Org. type: LLC
- Website: cincinnatirollergirls.com

The Cincinnati Rollergirls is a women's flat track roller derby league based in Cincinnati, Ohio. Founded in 2005, the league currently consists of two teams which compete against teams from other leagues, and is a member of the Women's Flat Track Derby Association (WFTDA).

== History and structure ==
The league was founded by Paula Estes and Christa Zielke in April 2005, wanting a new way to exercise. By the following year, they had enough skaters to form four teams: the Bloody Sundaes, Cincinnati Riots, Dames of Destruction and Full Metal Corsets. They played their first public bout in September 2006, selling out the 700-seat venue. By the following year, the league rationalized to two teams, and from 2008 it focused entirely on bouts against teams from other leagues.

The league affiliated with the Women's Flat Track Derby Association (WFTDA) in 2007, and reached fourth place in its North Central Region by 2009.

After playing its home games at the Cincinnati Gardens since 2006, where a 2011 high-water mark for attendance was 4100 fans, the league was forced to look for a new home when the Gardens was announced in 2016 to be slated for demolition. In February 2017 it was announced that the league was moving to the Schmidt Memorial Field House at Xavier University in time for its 2017 season.

Cincinnati Rollergirls is a limited liability corporation with two teams; the Black Sheep is the league's A team, and its B team is the Violent Lambs.

== WFTDA competition ==
For their first season as a WFTDA member in 2008, Cincinnati was placed in the East Region, and competed at that year's Eastern Regional Tournament as the 11th seed, and went 2-2 with victories against Grand Raggidy Roller Girls and Minnesota Rollergirls and losses against Boston and Charm City Roller Girls to finish in ninth place. In 2009, now part of the North Central Region, Cincinnati was the fourth seed at the North Central Regional Tournament, and finished in fourth place with a 126-62 loss to Detroit.

The league started 2010 strongly, winning their first seven bouts against WFTDA opposition, leading to them being seeded fourth for the 2010 North Central Region Playoff, where they again finished in fourth place, losing 164-143 to Mad Rollin' Dolls. In the 2011 Playoffs, Cincinnati were seeded fifth, but ultimately took eighth place, after a 157-99 loss to Brewcity Bruisers. As the seventh seed at the 2012 North Centrals, Cincinnati lost their first two games but recovered to defeat Chicago Outfit 180-166 to claim ninth place.

In 2013, the WFTDA changed their playoff structure, and Cincinnati qualified for the WFTDA Division 1 International Playoff tournament in Fort Wayne, Indiana as the eighth seed, finishing in eighth with a 275-95 loss to Wasatch Roller Derby. After missing Playoffs in 2014 and 2015, Cincinnati returned to Playoffs at the WFTDA Division 2 level in 2016 as the fourth seed in Lansing, Michigan, where they went 1-3 and ultimately finished in eighth place after a 220-174 loss to the Sac City Rollers.

=== Rankings ===
pre-2016 league logo

Season	Final ranking	Playoffs	Championship
2007	NR	N/A	N/A
2008	3 NC	9 E	DNQ
2009	4 NC	4 NC	DNQ
2010	5 NC	4 NC	DNQ
2011	8 NC	8 NC	DNQ
2012	9 NC	9 NC	DNQ
2013	38 WFTDA	8 D1	DNQ
2014	98 WFTDA	DNQ	DNQ
2015	70 WFTDA	DNQ	DNQ
2016	61 WFTDA	7 D2	DNQ
2017	NR WFTDA	DNQ	DNQ

- NR = no end-of-year ranking supplied
