= North Central Province =

North Central Province may refer to:

- North Central Province, Maldives
- North Central Province, Sri Lanka
- North Central Province (Victoria), former electorate of the Victorian Legislative Council (Australia), abolished in 1908

== See also ==
- North Central (disambiguation)
