= Brewcity Bruisers =

Roller derby league

- Metro area: Milwaukee, Wisconsin
- Country: United States
- Founded: October 19, 2005
- Teams: All-Stars (A-Team); Battlestars (B-Team)
- Track type: Flat
- Venue: New Berlin Sportsplex
- Affiliations: WFTDA (North America Northeast)
- Org. type: 501(c)3
- Website: brewcitybruisers.com

The Brewcity Bruisers is a women's flat-track roller derby league based in Milwaukee, Wisconsin. Founded in 2005, the league played their twentieth season in 2025. The Bruisers are a member of the Women's Flat Track Derby Association (WFTDA).

== History and organization ==
Brewcity Bruisers was founded in late 2005 by skaters "Jesse Jameson", "Butch Cassidy" and "Cris Carny Power", and was announced as a new member of the Women's Flat Track Derby Association in May 2007. By 2011 the league was drawing over 3500 people to an event at U.S. Cellular Arena.

From its inception until 2019, the Brewcity Bruisers home league was composed of four home teams, the Crazy 8s, the Maiden Milwaukee, the Shevil Knevils, and the Rushin' Rollettes. Skaters from these home teams participated in two travel teams, the All-Stars (A-level team) and the Battlestars (B-level).

In 2019, the league restructured, retiring the four home teams and establishing the All-Stars and Battlestars as its two teams. The league is supported by a cheer/dance team called the Brewcity Beerleaders, as well as a group of skating referees and NSOs (Non-Skating Officials).

== WFTDA competition ==
In 2009 Brewcity was the ninth seed at the WFTDA North Central Regional Tournament and finished in seventh place after an overtime victory over Burning River Roller Girls, 126-116. Brewcity was the fifth seed at the 2010 North Central Playoff, but finished in eighth place following a 138-84 loss to North Star Rollergirls. As the seventh seed in 2011, Brewcity finished in seventh place with a 157-99 victory over Cincinnati Rollergirls. Brewcity was the ninth seed at the final North Central Playoff in 2012, and improved to a sixth-place finish, ending with a 222-61 loss to Detroit Derby Girls.

In 2013, the WFTDA changed their playoff structure, and Brewcity qualified for the WFTDA Division 2 International Playoff tournament in Des Moines, Iowa as the second seed, ultimately finishing in sixth place. Brewcity returned to Division 2 Playoffs in 2014 as the fourth seed in Duluth, and finished in seventh place with a 186-174 victory over Brandywine Roller Girls. In 2015, Brewcity was the ninth seed at Division 2 Playoffs in Detroit, but lost all three of their games to finish in tenth place.

In 2024, Brewcity's B team, the Brewcity Battlestars, were officially sanctioned by WFTDA and played their seeding game against Madison Roller Derby's The Herd on February 10.

=== Rankings ===
==== All-Stars ====
| Season | Final ranking | Playoffs | Championship |
|---|---|---|---|
| 2007 | 27 WFTDA | DNQ | DNQ |
| 2008 | 8 NC | DNQ | DNQ |
| 2009 | 6 NC | 7 NC | DNQ |
| 2010 | 8 NC | 8 NC | DNQ |
| 2011 | 7 NC | 7 NC | DNQ |
| 2012 | 7 NC | 6 NC | DNQ |
| 2013 | 62 WFTDA | 6 D2 | DNQ |
| 2014 | 50 WFTDA | 7 D2 | DNQ |
| 2015 | 60 WFTDA | 10 D2 | DNQ |
| 2016 | 107 WFTDA | DNQ | DNQ |
| 2017 | 103 WFTDA | DNQ | DNQ |
| 2018 | 89 WFTDA | DNQ | DNQ |
| 2019 | 78 WFTDA | DNQ | DNQ |
| 2020-2022 | - | - | - |
| 2023 | 32 NA Northeast | - | - |
| 2024 | 25 NA Northeast | DNQ | DNQ |
| 2025 | 31 NA Northeast | DNQ | DNQ |

WFTDA postseason tournaments were put on hold for 2020-2023 due to the global COVID-190 pandemic.

==== Battlestars ====
| Season | Final ranking | Playoffs | Championship |
|---|---|---|---|
| 2024 | 94 NA Northeast | DNQ | DNQ |
| 2025 | 86 NA Northeast | DNQ | DNQ |
