= Hammer City Roller Derby =

Roller derby league

- Metro area: Hamilton, Ontario
- Country: Canada
- Founded: 2006
- Teams: Eh! Team (A team); Dundurn Hassle (B team); Pier Pressure (rookie)
- Track type: Flat
- Venue: Dave Andreychuk Arena; J. L. Grightmire Arena
- Affiliations: WFTDA
- Website: hammercityrollerderby.ca

Hammer City Roller Derby is a women's flat track roller derby league based in Hamilton, Ontario. Founded in 2006, the league currently consists of three teams which compete against teams from other leagues, and is a member of the Women's Flat Track Derby Association (WFTDA).

== History ==
The league was founded as Hammer City Roller Girls in January 2006, and played its first bout in July, attracting almost 1,000 fans to what was described as "the region's first roller derby in decades". In 2009, Hammer City became one of the first two Canadian leagues accepted into the Women's Flat Track Derby Association (WFTDA). In February 2017, the organization rebranded itself as Hammer City Roller Derby, to "more accurately reflect the diversity of (its) membership".

== League structure ==
When the league was first formed, there were three home teams: The Death Row Dames, The Hamilton Harlots and The Steeltown Tank Girls. In early 2011 Hammer City reorganized the league structure, keeping the Harlots as a secondary travel team to the charter Eh! Team, which competes in the WFTDA North Central Region. In 2007, the Harlots were the first winners of the Beast of The East invitational tournament hosted by Montreal Roller Derby. In 2014, Hammer City was placed in the WFTDA's Division 2, having finished at 85 overall the previous year.

As of February 2017, in conjunction with the league rebrand, Hammer City features three teams: the A-level WFTDA charter team remains the Eh! Team, the B-level Harlots become the Dundurn Hassle (named in honour of local landmark, Dundurn Castle), and the rookie-level team is Pier Pressure. Hammer City hosts home games at Dave Andreychuk Arena in Hamilton.

== WFTDA rankings ==
Former Hammer City logo

Season	Final ranking	Playoffs	Championship
2009	17 NC	DNQ	DNQ
2010	18 NC	DNQ	DNQ
2011	25 NC	DNQ	DNQ
2012	29 NC	DNQ	DNQ
2013	85 WFTDA	DNQ	DNQ
2014	108 WFTDA	DNQ	DNQ
2015	144 WFTDA	DNQ	DNQ
2016	147 WFTDA	DNQ	DNQ
