= Schmidt Fieldhouse =

Building in Ohio, United States

Coordinates: 39.149666°N 84.478340°W

- Interactive map of Schmidt Fieldhouse
- Former names: Xavier University Fieldhouse
- Location: Xavier University; Cincinnati, OH 45207
- Owner: Xavier University
- Operator: Xavier University
- Capacity: 3,000

Construction
- Groundbreaking: 1927
- Opened: March 7, 1928

Tenants
- Xavier Musketeers (NCAA); Men's basketball (1928–1983); Women's basketball (1971–2000); Cincinnati Rollergirls (WFTDA) (2017–present)

Schmidt Fieldhouse, formerly known as Xavier University Fieldhouse, is an on-campus arena at Xavier University in Cincinnati, Ohio.

== History ==
It was built in 1927 and opened on March 7, 1928, with a win against archrival Cincinnati. It is named for Walter Schmidt, Class of 1905, a benefactor to then-St. Xavier College who also donated money for Schmidt Hall (formerly the library, now the President's office) on campus.

It was the first on-campus arena for the university, and was in use by the men's basketball team from the last game of the 1928 season to 1983, when the team moved to the off-campus Cincinnati Gardens full-time. (The team had played a few big games a year there, as well as Riverfront Coliseum, prior to that.) Since 1983, the team has only returned once to the arena, for a game against Florida International University in January 1988. Schmidt Fieldhouse was also used by the women's basketball team from 1971 until moving to the Cintas Center in 2000.

Currently the fieldhouse is the home of the Cincinnati Rollergirls. It is also used for the school's recreational sports program. It has also hosted concerts, including Jimi Hendrix, Rush and Robin Trower, and a speech by President Bill Clinton in 1996.
