= Bleeding Heartland Roller Derby =

Roller derby league

- Metro area: Bloomington, Indiana
- Country: United States
- Founded: 2006
- Teams: Flatliners (A team); Code Blue Assassins (B team)
- Track type(s): Flat
- Venue: Frank Southern Ice Arena
- Affiliations: WFTDA
- Website: bleedingheartlandrollerderby.com

Bleeding Heartland Roller Derby (BHRD) is a roller derby league based in Bloomington, Indiana, United States. Founded in 2006, but has since disbanded in 2019.

== History ==
The league played its first home bout in August 2007. Founded as "Bleeding Heartland Rollergirls", the league rebranded in 2014 as Bleeding Heartland Roller Derby, to "more accurately reflect the composition of our organization", as noted in an announcement on their official Facebook page.

== WFTDA play ==
Former Bleeding Heartland logo

The league was accepted as a member of the Women's Flat Track Derby Association in December 2008. It competed in the 2010 Spring Roll event, hosted by the Fort Wayne Derby Girls. Bleeding Heartland initially had a losing record, and finished both the 2009 and 2010 seasons ranked in 16th place in the North Central Region, but rose to 13th over the course of 2011.

In 2013, Bleeding Heartland qualified for the WFTDA Division 1 Playoffs for the first time, ultimately finishing the Fort Wayne tournament in 10th place.

== Rankings ==
Season	Final ranking	Playoffs	Championship
2009	16 NC	DNQ	DNQ
2010	16 NC	DNQ	DNQ
2011	13 NC	DNQ	DNQ
2012	11 NC	DNQ	DNQ
2013	41 WFTDA	10 D1	DNQ
2014	102 WFTDA	DNQ	DNQ
2015	184 WFTDA	DNQ	DNQ
2016	198 WFTDA	DNQ	DNQ
2017	248 WFTDA	DNQ	DNQ
