= North Central Conference (disambiguation) =

The North Central Conference was a college athletic conference that operated in the United States.

North Central Conference may also refer to:

- North Central Conference (IHSAA), an IHSAA-sanctioned athletic conference; Indiana
- North Central Conference (Iowa), an eight-team high school athletic conference
- North Central Conference (OHSAA), an OHSAA athletic league; Ohio
- North Central Community College Conference (N4C), of the National Junior College Athletic Association; in Illinois and Wisconsin

== See also ==
- North Conference (disambiguation)
- North Central (disambiguation)
