= Twin City Derby Girls =

Roller derby league

Twin City Derby Group
- Metro area: Champaign, IL
- Country: United States
- Founded: 2010
- Teams: Evil Twins (A team); Dead Ringers (B team); Alter Egos (C team)
- Track type: Flat
- Affiliations: WFTDA
- Website: twincityderbygirls.com

Twin City Derby Group (TCDG) is a roller derby league based in Champaign-Urbana, Illinois. Founded in 2010, the league currently consists of three teams, which play teams from other leagues. In 2022 the league changed its name from Twin City Derby Girls to Twin City Derby Group to reflect a policy of gender inclusivity.

Twin City Derby Group is a member of the Women's Flat Track Derby Association (WFTDA).

== History ==
Twin City was established at the beginning of 2010. By the end of the year, it was regularly sold out its venue - for the final bout of the season, it sold out in twelve minutes. As a result, it, moved to the 1,200-seater University of Illinois Ice Arena for the 2011 season. Home games were then played out of Skateland in Savoy, IL and the David S. Palmer Arena in Danville, IL.

The league was accepted into the Women's Flat Track Derby Association Apprentice Program in July 2010, and became a full member of the WFTDA in March 2012.

Up until December 2013, the Twin City Derby Girls consisted of three league teams (the Damagin' Dames, the 'Paign, and the Boneyard Bombshells) as well as two travel leagues, an A and a B team. As of 2017, Twin City has three teams, the Evil Twins (Travel A), Dead Ringers (Travel B), and the Alter Egos (C) as well as a new skater program, Doppel Gang.

== WFTDA rankings ==
Season	Final ranking	Playoffs	Championship
2012	22 NC	DNQ	DNQ
2013	71 WFTDA	DNQ	DNQ
2014	83 WFTDA	DNQ	DNQ
2015	92 WFTDA	DNQ	DNQ
2016	68 WFTDA	DNQ	DNQ
