= North Central =

North Central may refer to:

- North Central Airlines, a defunct United States based airline
- North-Central American English
- North Central College, a private, 4-year liberal arts college located in Naperville, Illinois
- The North Central region of the United States, which is divided into the West North Central States and the East North Central States
- North Central Nigeria
- North Central Province, Maldives
- North Central Province, Sri Lanka
- North Central Region, United States, the former name of the Midwestern United States
- North Central Region (WFTDA)
- North Central Service, commuter rail service in the United States
- North Central University in Minneapolis, Minnesota
- Northcentral University, a doctoral research university
- North Central Conference (disambiguation)
