= Northern Illinois Conference =

Northern Illinois Conference may refer to the following:

- Northern Illinois Conference (United Methodist)
- Northern Illinois Conference (athletic conference), a highschool athletics conference
- Northern Illinois-Iowa Conference, a defunct NCAA Division III college athletics conference
- Big Northern Conference (Illinois), a highschool athletics conference

== See also ==
- North Conference (disambiguation)
