= Babe City Rollers =

Roller derby league in Bemidji, Minnesota, US

- Metro area: Bemidji, MN
- Country: United States
- Founded: 2009
- Track type: Flat
- Venue: Sanford Center
- Affiliations: WFTDA
- Website: Archived 2019-03-28 at the Wayback Machine

The Babe City Rollers is a women's flat track roller derby league based in Bemidji, Minnesota. Founded in 2009, Babe City is a member of the Women's Flat Track Derby Association (WFTDA).

== History and organization ==
The league was founded in 2009 by two local women: Shannon Murray, inspired by watching a Windy City Rollers bout, and Sara Bronczyk, a former figure skater. By early 2010, it had members with ages ranging from 19 to 55, totaling more than twenty skaters. It played its first bout in February of that year.

Babe City was accepted into the Women's Flat Track Derby Association Apprentice Program in July 2010, and became a full member of the WFTDA in June 2011.

Babe City Rollers is a member-run, non profit sports league that is committed to active community involvement. Each home bout helps raise money for area charities, including Nameless Coalition for the Homeless, Great River Rescue (formally Beltrami Humane Society), and Support Within Reach.

== Rankings ==
Season	Final ranking	Playoffs	Championship
2012	25 NC	DNQ	DNQ
2013	129 WFTDA	DNQ	DNQ
2014	166 WFTDA	DNQ	DNQ
2015	174 WFTDA	DNQ	DNQ
2016	264 WFTDA	DNQ	DNQ
2017	NR WFTDA	DNQ	DNQ

- NR = no end-of-year ranking assigned
