= Windy City Rollers =

Roller derby league

- Sport: Roller derby
- Founded: September 2004; 21 years ago
- No. of teams: 4
- Country: United States
- Venue: Credit Union 1 Arena
- Website: www.windycityrollers.com

Windy City Rollers is a women's flat-track roller derby league located in Chicago, Illinois. Founded by Juanna Rumbel (Elizabeth Gomez) and Sister Sledgehammer (Kelly Simmons) in 2004, Windy City is the first flat-track roller derby league established in Chicago, and is a founding member of the Women's Flat Track Derby Association (WFTDA).

== League history ==
Chicago residents Juanna Rumbel (Elizabeth Gomez) and Sister Sledgehammer (Kelly Simmons) were introduced to the roller derby revival on a trip to Austin, Texas in April 2004, where they were served at a bar by a member of the Texas Rollergirls. After their trip, Simmons and Gomez organized the four-team league, and at the initial practice 96 women appeared. Organizational fundraisers followed, along with open skates at locations such as the South Side's Martin Luther King skating rink to continue recruitment. The league engaged skater/speedskater Susan (Sabin) Schwartz to train and coach the 66 skaters and eventually Windy City began holding bouting events in July 2005, and by the end of the year was regularly drawing 2,000 fans to games at Chicago's Congress Theater, attracting the largest audience flat-track derby had yet seen at the time. That first season the league used a smaller than regulation-sized track due to limitations at their venue - they literally skated in the orchestra pit at the Congress Theater - and moved to Cicero Stadium in early 2006 for a proper-sized space. The Windy City Rollers changed venues again in October 2008 and currently play at the Credit Union 1 Arena.

On August 25, 2007, Chicago attorney Tahirah Johnson, skating as "Tequila Mockingbird" for The Fury, was injured in the most serious accident of the current roller derby revival. She injured her spinal cord during a bout, and was temporarily paralyzed from the neck down. She has since moved to Oklahoma City, and through physical therapy has regained some movement in all of her limbs.

== Member teams ==
=== Home teams ===
Windy City has a four-team home league, comprising the Double Crossers, the Fury, Hell's Belles and the Manic Attackers. These teams compete for an annual championship game named after Chicago roller derby legend, Ivy King. The Fury won the Ivy King Cup in 2005 and 2006. In 2007 the trophy was claimed by the Double Crossers. In 2008 the Ivy King Cup was won by the Hell's Belles. In 2009 the Manic Attackers beat out the Hell's Belles to win the Ivy King Cup. The Fury came back to claim the cup in 2010 and 2011. The Manic Attackers beat The Fury in 2012 to win the title. But The Fury won back the cup yet again in 2013. After seasons of defeat, the Double Crossers won it in 2014, before the Belles, after being shut out for seven years, won it in 2015 in a win over The Fury.

In December 2015, the Windy City Rollers held their final home team "season", which was a single night, 30 minute game round-robin tournament to temporarily retire the home teams. A newly-minted Juanna Rumbel Cup, named after the league's co-founder, was presented to the winning Manic Attackers.

The Haymarket Rioters are the Windy City Rollers' farm team.

=== Travel teams ===
- Windy City Rollers All-Stars - The all star travel team for competition with other leagues in the Women's Flat Track Derby Association.
- Second Wind - Windy City Rollers' B Team
- Third Coast - Windy City Rollers' C Team

== WFTDA competition ==
In early 2006, the Windy City Rollers began interleague bouting. After finishing 18th out of 20 teams at the first WFTDA Championships, the "Dust Devil" in February 2006, the league regrouped, moved to a new venue that allowed the space for a regulation sized track, and increased the number of league practices. After completing another season of intra-league bouting, the All-Stars team was reformed. In early 2007, the league resumed inter-league play.

The Windy City Rollers All-Stars entered the competition at the 2007 WFTDA Eastern Regional Tournament in Columbus (the "Heartland Havoc") ranked 14th in the nation (7th in their region). After defeating Atlanta Rollergirls on day one, they achieved what many considered a stunning victory on day 2, defeating Madison, Wisconsin's Mad Rollin' Dolls, ranked fourth nationally and first in the Eastern region. They went on to claim second place in the tournament, defeating the Carolina Rollergirls before falling to New York's Gotham Girls. At the 2007 WFTDA National Championships (the "Texas Shootout") in Austin, Texas, the All-Stars were defeated 108-56 in the first round by the home favorite Texas Rollergirls.

At the 2008 WFTDA Eastern Regional Tournament in Madison ("Derby in Dairyland") the Windy City Rollers All-Stars defeated Baltimore's Charm City Rollergirls and the Carolina Rollergirls to advance to the final match, which they lost to Gotham 133-92 to placed second in the region and advance them to the 2008 Championships in Portland. At Championships the All-Stars advanced to the final after defeating Seattle's Rat City Rollergirls and the Texas Rollergirls, but lost the championship to Gotham, 134-66.

In 2009, now part of the North Central Region, Windy City won the WFTDA North Central Regional Tournament in St. Paul, Minnesota (the "Brawl of America"), beating the Minnesota RollerGirls (St. Paul), Cincinnati Rollergirls and Mad Rollin' Dolls. Windy had a bye past the preliminary round at the 2009 Championships but were defeated in the quarterfinals by Denver Roller Dolls 157-125. Windy City repeated as North Central Regional champions in 2010, with wins against North Star Rollergirls (Minneapolis), Naptown Roller Girls (Indianapolis), Cincinnati and Minnesota. In November Windy City hosted the WFTDA Championships, dubbed the "Uproar on the Lakeshore", with a weekend attendance of 8,815 at the UIC Pavilion. Again with a bye past the first round, Windy City lost their quarterfinal game 174-76 to the Oly Rollers of Olympia, Washington. Windy won their third straight North Central Regional in 2011 by defeating Minnesota, 123-100, and again fell in the quarterfinals at Champs, this time 112-95 to the Kansas City Roller Warriors. 2012 was the final year of regional play for the WFTDA, and Windy City again captured the regional title, defeating Minnesota 165-153 in Niagara Falls, New York. Windy City then lost their fourth consecutive Champs quarterfinal, 212-130 to Denver.

Windy's long-standing rivalry with the Minnesota RollerGirls came to a head in June 2012 when the two teams played to a rare tie in WFTDA-sanctioned play. The tie (later upheld upon review by the WFTDA) resulted from a scorekeeping correction made well after the end of play, avoiding a potential overtime jam which ordinarily would have settled the score.

In 2013, the WFTDA changed their playoff structure, and Windy City qualified for the WFTDA Division 1 International Playoff tournament in Asheville, North Carolina as the third seed, ultimately finishing in third with a 160-154 victory over old North Central rival Minnesota. After winning their opening round match against the Philly Roller Girls, Windy lost their quarterfinal to Bay Area Derby, 230-135. At the 2014 D1 Playoff in Evansville, Indiana, Windy upset higher-ranked Texas in the semifinals, dropping the final to London Rollergirls 226-131. Windy won their opening game at Champs over Rocky Mountain Rollergirls, but lost their sixth straight Champs quarterfinal 241-133 to Rose City Rollers. Ahead of the 2015 season, a number of skaters, including some original members of Windy City, moved away and/or retired from roller derby, dropping Windy in the rankings as the team reorganized. In October Windy City missed WFTDA Championships for the first time with a ninth-place finish at the Omaha Division 1 Playoff, ending with a victory over Toronto Roller Derby. Seeded eighth for the 2016 Madison Division 1 Playoff, Windy City opened the weekend with a victory over Ohio Roller Derby, but then dropped their remaining games to Gotham, Team United Roller Derby and hosts Mad Rollin' Dolls to finish in eighth place. At the 2017 Division 1 Playoff in Seattle, Windy City lost their opening game to 2×4 Roller Derby 178-135, and also lost their consolation round game to Tampa Bay Derby 222-150 to finish out of the medals. In 2018 at the WFTDA Playoff in Atlanta, Windy City finished out of the medals, ending their weekend with a consolation round loss, 213-185 to Ann Arbor Roller Derby.

=== Rankings ===
Season	Final ranking	Playoffs	Championship
2006	22 WFTDA	—	18
2007	7 WFTDA	2 E	R1
2008	1 NC	2 E	2
2009	1 NC	1 NC	QF
2010	1 NC	1 NC	QF
2011	1 NC	1 NC	QF
2012	1 NC	7 NC	QF
2013	8 WFTDA	3 D1	QF D1
2014	11 WFTDA	5 D1	QF D1
2015	61 WFTDA	9 D1	DNQ
2016	39 WFTDA	8 D1	DNQ
2017	24 WFTDA	CR D1	DNQ
2018	27 WFTDA	CR	DNQ
2019	20 WFTDA	CR	DNQ
2023	5 WFTDA NA Northeast	DNQ	DNQ
2024	8 WFTDA NA Northeast	4 NE	DNQ

- CR = consolation round

Preceded by New tournament	WFTDA North Central Regional Tournament winners 2009–2012	Succeeded by Tournaments restructured
