= North Central Region (WFTDA) =

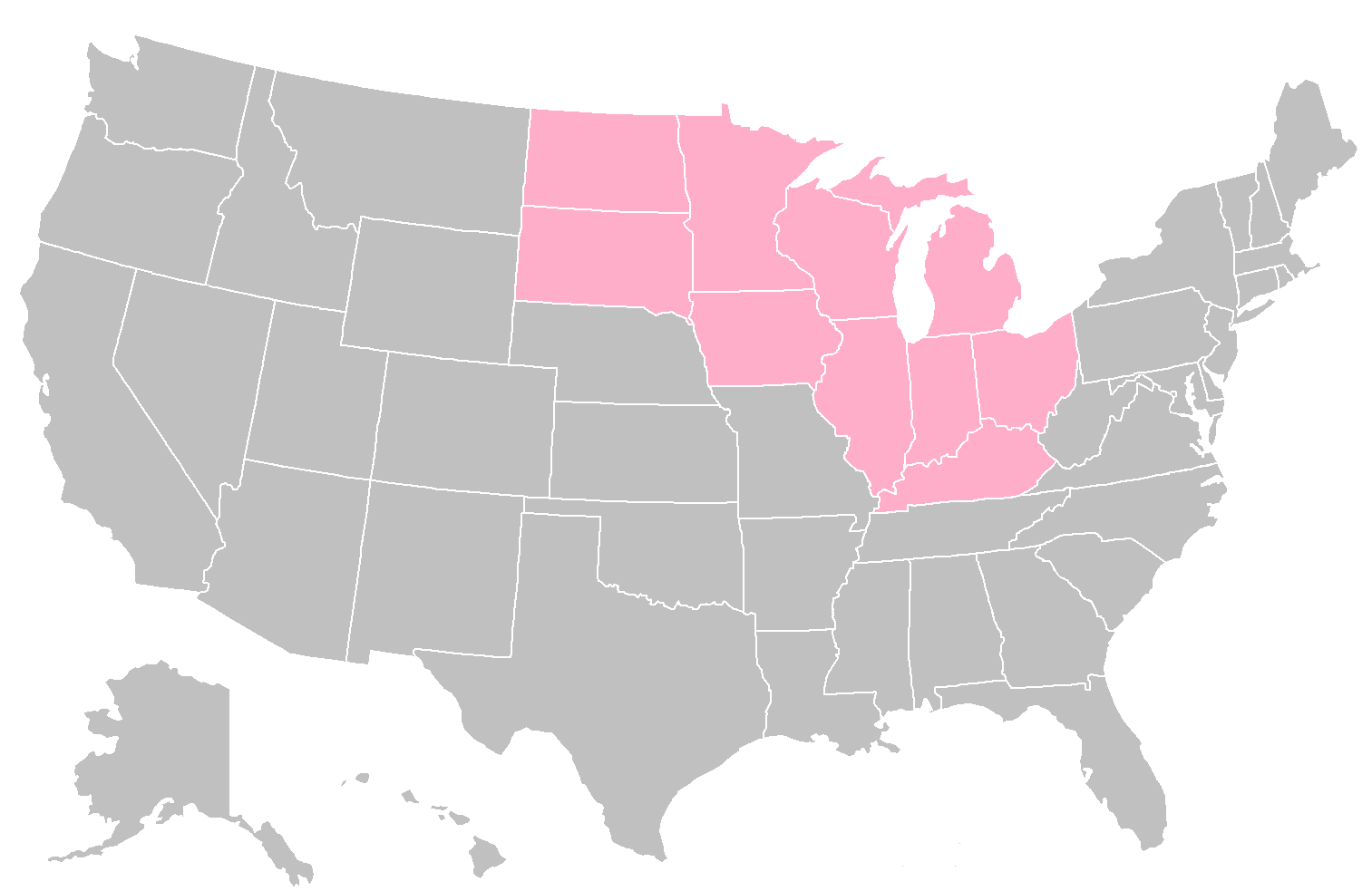
WFTDA North Central Region

The Women's Flat Track Derby Association's North Central Region was formed in 2008 when WFTDA changed from having just two regional tournaments (East and West) to five—consisting of teams from four regions: East, North Central, South Central, and West.

Members in the central part of the Canada Region competed in the North Central Region. For 2011, the region was reduced in size, with teams in Nebraska moving to the South Central Region.

WFTDA has now moved away from the Big 5 WFTDA Championships qualification tournament structure, which was last held in 2012. Starting with the 2013 WFTDA season, the regions were discontinued in favour of an overall-rankings based system, and a new playoff format was created.

== Member leagues ==
| League | Metro area | Country | Admitted | Notes |
|---|---|---|---|---|
| Arch Rival Rollergirls | St Louis, MO | United States | 1 January 2009 | Transferred from East Region |
| Babe City Rollers | Bemidji, MN | United States | 1 June 2011 | |
| Black-n-Bluegrass Rollergirls | Latonia, KY | United States | 1 March 2012 | |
| Bleeding Heartland Rollergirls | Bloomington, IN | United States | 23 December 2008 | |
| Brewcity Bruisers | Milwaukee, WI | United States | 1 January 2009 | Transferred from East Region |
| Burning River Roller Girls | Cleveland, OH | United States | 1 January 2009 | Transferred from East Region |
| Chicago Outfit Roller Derby | Chicago, IL | United States | 17 June 2010 | |
| Cincinnati Rollergirls | Cincinnati, OH | United States | 1 January 2009 | Transferred from East Region |
| Circle City Derby Girls | Indianapolis, IN | United States | 1 June 2012 | |
| CoMo Derby Dames | Columbia, MO | United States | 1 March 2012 | |
| Demolition City Roller Derby | Evansville, IN | United States | 17 June 2010 | |
| Derby City Rollergirls | Louisville, KY | United States | 2009 | |
| Detroit Derby Girls | Detroit, MI | United States | 1 January 2009 | Transferred from East Region |
| Fargo Moorehead Derby Girls | Fargo, ND | United States | 1 March 2012 | |
| Fort Wayne Derby Girls | Fort Wayne, IN | United States | 1 January 2009 | Transferred from East Region |
| Fox Cityz Foxz | Oshkosh, WI | United States | 1 September 2010 | |
| Glass City Rollers | Toledo, OH | United States | 1 March 2012 | |
| Grand Raggidy Roller Girls | Grand Rapids, MI | United States | 1 January 2009 | Transferred from East Region |
| Hammer City Roller Girls | Hamilton, ON | Canada | 2009 | |
| Killamazoo Derby Darlins | Kalamazoo, MI | United States | 1 September 2010 | |
| Little Steel Derby Girls | Youngstown, OH | United States | 1 June 2012 | |
| Mad Rollin' Dolls | Madison, WI | United States | 1 January 2009 | Transferred from East Region |
| McLean County MissFits | Danvers, IL | United States | 3 December 2012 | |
| Minnesota RollerGirls | St. Paul, MN | United States | 1 January 2009 | Transferred from East Region |
| Mississippi Valley Mayhem | La Crosse, WI | United States | 3 December 2012 | |
| Naptown Roller Girls | Indianapolis, IN | United States | 1 January 2009 | Transferred from East Region |
| NEO Rock n' Rollergirls | Akron, OH | United States | 1 September 2010 | |
| North Star Roller Girls | Minneapolis, MN | United States | 15 December 2008 | |
| Ohio Roller Girls | Columbus, OH | United States | 1 January 2009 | Transferred from East Region |
| Old Capitol City Roller Girls | Iowa City, IA | United States | 10 January 2012 | |
| Paper Valley Rollergirls | Appleton, WI | United States | 17 June 2010 | |
| Rockford Rage Women's Roller Derby | Rockford, IL | United States | 17 June 2010 | |
| Sioux Falls Roller Dollz | Sioux Falls, SD | United States | 1 January 2009 | Transferred from West Region |
| Southern Illinois Roller Girls | Marion, IL | United States | 10 January 2012 | |
| St. Chux Derby Chix | St. Charles, MO | United States | 7 September 2012 | |
| Toronto Roller Derby | Toronto, ON | Canada | 1 June 2011 | |
| Tri-City Rollergirls | Kitchener, ON | Canada | 1 December 2010 | |
| Twin City Derby Girls | Champaign, IL | United States | 1 March 2012 | |
| Windy City Rollers | Chicago, IL | United States | 1 January 2009 | Transferred from East Region |

== Former members ==
| League | Metro area | Admitted | Left | Notes |
|---|---|---|---|---|
| Gem City Rollergirls | Dayton, OH | 1 January 2009 | November 2010 | Transferred from East Region; became Apprentice members. |
| Omaha Rollergirls | Omaha, NE | 1 January 2009 | 1 January 2011 | Transferred from East Region and to South Central Region |
| Rollergirls of Southern Indiana | Evansville, IN | 17 June 2010 | 22 September 2012 | League dissolved on September 22, 2012. |

== Rankings ==
Official WFTDA Regional Rankings as of January 29, 2013

| Region | North Central |
| 1 | Windy City Rollers |
| 2 | Minnesota RollerGirls |
| 3 | Naptown Roller Girls |
| 4 | Ohio Roller Girls |
| 5 | Detroit Derby Girls |
| 6 | Mad Rollin' Dolls |
| 7 | Brewcity Bruisers |
| 8 | Arch Rival Rollergirls |
| 9 | Cincinnati Rollergirls |
| 10 | The Chicago Outfit |
| 11 | Bleeding Heartland Roller Girls |
| 12 | Tri-City Roller Girls |
| 13 | Killamazoo Derby Darlins |
| 14 | Toronto Roller Derby |
| 15 | Grand Raggidy Roller Girls |
| 16 | Fort Wayne Derby Girls |
| 17 | Burning River Roller Girls |
| 18 | Paper Valley Rollergirls |
| 19 | NEO Roller Derby |
| 20 | Old Capitol City Roller Girls |
| 21 | North Star Roller Girls |
| 22 | Demolition City Roller Derby |
| 23 | Fargo Moorhead Derby Girls |
| 24 | Twin City Derby Girls |
| 25 | Babe City Rollers |
| 26 | Sioux Falls Roller Dollz |
| 27 | Black-n-Bluegrass Rollergirls |
| 28 | Derby City Rollergirls |
| 29 | Hammer City Roller Girls |
| 30 | CoMo Derby Dames |
| 31 | St. Chux Derby Chix |
| 32 | Fox Cityz Foxz |
| 33 | Rockford Rage Women's Roller Derby |
| 34 | Southern Illinois Roller Girls |

Member teams unranked at this time:

- Circle City Derby Girls
- Glass City Rollers
- Little Steel Derby Girls
- McLean County MissFits
- Mississippi Valley Mayhem

== Region Champions ==
- 2009 - Windy City Rollers
- 2010 - Windy City Rollers
- 2011 - Windy City Rollers
- 2012 - Windy City Rollers

== Hydra Trophy winners produced ==
none

== North Central Region titles won by league ==
| League | Number of Championships Won | Last Year Won |
|---|---|---|
| Windy City Rollers | 4 | 2012 |

== See also ==
- East Region
- West Region
- South Central Region
