= Fort Wayne Roller Derby =

Roller derby league

- Metro area: Fort Wayne, IN
- Country: United States
- Founded: 2005
- Teams: Bomb Squad (A team); SWAT Team (B team); The Academy (rookie team)
- Track type: Flat
- Venue: Parkview Fieldhouse and Parkview Icehouse
- Affiliations: WFTDA
- Website: www.fortwaynederbygirls.com

Fort Wayne Roller Derby (FWRD) is an open gender flat track roller derby league based in Fort Wayne, Indiana. Founded in 2005 originally as Fort Wayne Derby Girls, the league currently consists of a women's team and an open gender team that compete against teams from all over the United States and Canada. Fort Wayne Roller Derby is a member of the Women's Flat Track Derby Association (WFTDA).

== History ==
Fort Wayne Derby Girls was the first flat track roller derby league in Indiana, founded in October 2005 by Danielle Smith (Abbott), who skates under the derby name "Little D Evil" and Tonya Vojtkofsky, who skated as "Minx", after they saw the Rat City Rollergirls in Seattle.

Former team logo

The league played its first exhibition bout in May 2006, to a crowd of 1,200 fans. According to Amber Recker, the first skater to respond to Minx's call for a new team, "We kind of had to get butts in seats by playing up the fighting and more of the sexy aspect of it. As we've evolved... we're much more sports driven". FWRD first played a team from another league in January 2007, when it took on the Gem City Rollergirls and in the same month it joined the Women's Flat Track Derby Association, (and was announced as a new member by the WFTDA in May 2007) and by the end of the year was ranked 29th in the WFTDA.

In 2009, it formed a B team, scrapping its intraleague teams. In 2013, Fort Wayne hosted a WFTDA Division 1 Playoff at the Allen County War Memorial Coliseum.

FWRD hosts the annual Spring Roll tournament, featuring women's, men's and junior roller derby games.

=== In the community ===
The league also focuses on charitable fundraising, and had donated more than $26,000 to charities by June 2008, and $110,000 by September 2013.

=== Rankings ===
Season	Final ranking	Playoffs	Championship
2007	29 WFTDA	DNQ	DNQ
2008	6 NC	DNQ	DNQ
2009	14 NC	DNQ	DNQ
2010	15 NC	DNQ	DNQ
2011	14 NC	DNQ	DNQ
2012	16 NC	DNQ	DNQ
2013	105 WFTDA	DNQ	DNQ
2014	85 WFTDA	DNQ	DNQ
2015	76 WFTDA	DNQ	DNQ
2016	105 WFTDA	DNQ	DNQ
2017	94 WFTDA	DNQ	DNQ
2018	209 WFTDA	DNQ	DNQ
2019	197 WFTDA	DNQ	DNQ
2023	90 NA Northeast	DNQ	DNQ
