= Old Capitol City Roller Derby =

Roller derby league

- Metro area: Iowa City, IA
- Country: United States
- Founded: 2008
- Teams: All Stars (A team); Ped Maulers (B team)
- Track type: Flat
- Venue: Coralville Marriott
- Affiliations: WFTDA
- Org. type: non-profit
- Website: occrd.com

Old Capitol City Roller Derby is a women's flat track roller derby league based in Iowa City, Iowa. Founded in 2008, the league currently consists of two teams which compete against teams from other leagues. Old Capitol City is a member of the Women's Flat Track Derby Association (WFTDA).

== History ==
The league began practicing in late 2008. In April 2010, it defeated the Des Moines Derby Dames travel team, for that league's first ever loss.

Old Capitol City was accepted into the Women's Flat Track Derby Association Apprentice Program in October 2010, and became a full member of the WFTDA in January 2012.

Old Capitol City changed their name in 2015 to Old Capitol City Roller Derby in order to project more gender inclusiveness, and at the same time changed the league organization to a non-profit.

== WFTDA rankings ==
Season	Final ranking	Playoffs	Championship
2012	20 NC	DNQ	DNQ
2013	87 WFTDA	DNQ	DNQ
2014	56 WFTDA	DNQ	DNQ
2015	87 WFTDA	DNQ	DNQ
2016	162 WFTDA	DNQ	DNQ
