= North Conference =

North Conference, Northern Conference, Conference North, or variant, may refer to:

== Europe ==
- FIBA Europe Conference North, a former basketball tournament

== New Zealand ==
- Northern Conference cricket team

== United Kingdom ==
- National League North (formerly Conference North), an English professional soccer league

== United States ==
- Big North Conference (Michigan), a high school athletics league
- Big North Conference (New Jersey), a high school athletics league
- Big Northern Conference (Illinois), a high school athletics league
- Great Northern Conference (Wisconsin), a high school athletics league
- Great Northern UP Conference (Michigan), a high school athletics league

== See also ==
- Northern Illinois Conference (disambiguation)
- North Central Conference (disambiguation)
- Northern Division (disambiguation)
- Conference
- Northern (disambiguation)
- North (disambiguation)
