= Mid Iowa Rollers =

Roller derby league

- Metro area: Des Moines, IA
- Country: United States
- Founded: 2006
- Teams: Mid Iowa Rollers (A team); Rollin Rebels (B team)
- Track type: Flat
- Venue: Camp Dodge
- Affiliations: WFTDA
- Website: www.midiowarollers.com

The Mid Iowa Rollers is a roller derby league based in Des Moines, Iowa. Founded in 2006, the league currently consists of two teams which compete against teams from other leagues.

The league was founded by Jamie "Dangerous" Daugharthy, after she watched Rollergirls on television. The league initially had five women skaters, and was the first to be created in Iowa. In its early days, the league was given considerable assistance by the No Coast Derby Girls, of Lincoln, Nebraska. By 2008, the league had twenty skaters, and was attracting around 500 fans to its bouts, while, in 2010, crowds topped 1,000, in a season in which the All Stars team won all eight of its interleague bouts.

Mid Iowa was accepted into the Women's Flat Track Derby Association Apprentice Program in October 2010, and became a full member of the WFTDA in December 2011.
