= Grand Raggidy Roller Derby =

Sports league

- Metro area: Grand Rapids, MI
- Country: United States
- Founded: 2005
- Teams: All Stars (A team); Attack! (B team)
- Track type(s): Flat
- Venue: Rivertown Sports
- Affiliations: WFTDA
- Website: grandraggidy.com

Grand Raggidy Roller Derby is a women's flat track roller derby league based in Grand Rapids, Michigan. Founded in 2005, the league is a founding member of the Women's Flat Track Derby Association (WFTDA).

== History ==
The league was founded as "Grand Raggidy Roller Girls" by Tricia "The Vindicator" Woolfenden and Katy "Shutter Speed" Batdorff in 2005. The first public game for Grand Raggidy was held in April 2006 with over 2,000 fans in attendance at the DeltaPlex Arena. Since as far back as 2009, Grand Raggidy has held its home games at Rivertown Sports, with exceptions in 2013 when the venue was flood-damaged.

Four of the league's skaters appeared as themselves in the movie Whip It!: Dot Matrix, Shutter Speed, Tamara Hurtsworse, and Jackie Daniels, who was recruited after skating for the mixed-league "Team Awesome" in Los Angeles.

In 2015, Grand Raggidy updated its name from "Roller Girls" to "Roller Derby", as part of its tenth anniversary season and recognizing the contributions of its members.

== WFTDA competition ==
pre-2015 league logo

The league qualified for the 2007 WFTDA Eastern Regional Tournament; they were seeded eleventh and lost in the first round to Gotham Girls Roller Derby, 206-47. They qualified again the following year, going 1–3 on the weekend and finished in tenth place. In 2009 Grand Raggidy qualified for the newly created WFTDA North Central Regional Tournament, seeded seventh, but lost all their bouts to finish tenth.

After missing WFTDA Playoffs from 2010–12, Grand Raggdiy qualified for Division 1 Playoffs in 2013, and went 1–2 as the tenth seed in Fort Wayne and finished in ninth place courtesy of a 186-134 victory over Bleeding Heartland. In 2014, Grand Raggidy competed at Division 2 Playoffs in Kitchener-Waterloo, Ontario as the tenth seed and went winless to finish in tenth. Grand Raggidy missed Playoffs in 2015 but returned to Division 2 in 2016 as the tenth seed in Lansing, Michigan, but again went winless and finished in tenth place.

=== Rankings ===
Season	Final ranking	Playoffs	Championship
2006	27 WFTDA	—	N/A
2007	24 WFTDA	R1 E	DNQ
2008	NR NC	10 E	DNQ
2009	10 NC	10 NC	DNQ
2010	12 NC	DNQ	DNQ
2011	11 NC	DNQ	DNQ
2012	15 NC	DNQ	DNQ
2013	56 WFTDA	9 D1	DNQ
2014	63 WFTDA	10 D2	DNQ
2015	67 WFTDA	DNQ	DNQ
2016	69 WFTDA	10 D2	DNQ
