= Gem City Roller Derby =

Roller derby league

- Metro area: Dayton, OH
- Country: United States
- Founded: 2006
- Teams: Purple Reign (A team); Violet Femmes (B team); Lavender Haze (C team); Bully Frogs; Murder Squad; Snark Attack
- Track type: Flat
- Venue: Skateworld of Vandalia
- Affiliations: WFTDA
- Org. type: 501(c)3
- Website: www.gemcityrollerderby.com

Gem City Roller Derby (GCRD) is a women's flat track roller derby league based in Dayton, Ohio. Founded in 2006, the league features two teams that compete against teams from other leagues, plus three home league teams that play each other. Gem City is a member of the Women's Flat Track Derby Association (WFTDA).

== History and organization ==
GCRD was founded as Gem City Rollergirls in January 2006 by Ginger Clark and Andrea Moore, known as "Helen of DesTroy" and "Cyn Vicious". The league initially formed two teams, the Queens of Hearts and the Aces of Spades, that later became the Rude Girls and Damage Inc. After a decrease in league membership, the two teams became one for several years. Steady growth led to a return of the two-team structure for the 2014 season. The new team names are The Purple Reign and The Violet Femmes.

Gem City rebranded in June 2016 as Gem City Roller Derby, and further expanded to include three intraleague home teams, who play one another during the travel team off season: Bully Frogs, Snark Attack, and Murder Squad. The Bully Frogs were the initial home season champion, with a 174–154 victory over the Murder Squad in March 2017.

== WFTDA ==
GCRD initially joined the Women's Flat Track Derby Association (WFTDA) in December 2007. However, after struggling to maintain a sufficient number of eligible skaters, GCRD was unable to play any fully sanctioned bouts during the 2008 season. During 2009 several long-standing skaters left the league, which also incurred increases in rink costs; however the league survived.

In 2010, the league reverted to the status of apprentice members of the WFTDA. The league grew each year following and, during the 2013 boot camp, nearly doubled in size to a total of over fifty skaters. Gem City earned its full WFTDA status back for the 2014 season.

=== Rankings ===
Season	Final ranking	Playoffs	Championship
2008	NR NC	DNQ	DNQ
2009	18 NC	DNQ	DNQ
2010	NR NC	DNQ	DNQ
2011	NR NC	DNQ	DNQ
2012	NR NC	DNQ	DNQ
2013	NR WFTDA	DNQ	DNQ
2014	181 WFTDA	DNQ	DNQ
2015	123 WFTDA	DNQ	DNQ
2016	104 WFTDA	DNQ	DNQ
2017	78 WFTDA	DNQ	DNQ
2018	67 WFTDA	DNQ	DNQ
2019	62 WFTDA	DNQ	DNQ
2023	14 NA Northeast	DNQ	DNQ
2024	63 NA Northeast	DNQ	DNQ

- league did not receive WFTDA final rankings 2010-2013
- no rankings from 2020-2022 due to COVID-19 pandemic
