= Fargo Moorhead Derby Girls =

Roller derby league

- Metro area: Fargo, ND
- Country: United States
- Founded: 2009
- Teams: Northern Pains, Furies
- Track type(s): Flat
- Venue: Fargo Civic Center
- Affiliations: WFTDA
- Website: fmderbygirls.com

The Fargo Moorhead Derby Girls (FMDG) is a roller derby league based in Fargo, North Dakota. Launched in 2008 by Sara Rundlett, the league currently consists of two teams, Northern Pains and Furies, who compete against other cities. The league began with two home teams, Fighting Suzies and Monkey Wenches, and one travel team, Northern Pains. In the Summer of 2010, in response to increased league membership, FMDG expanded to four home teams: Fighting Suzies, Monkey Wenches, Haute Dishes and BattleScar Galactica, and two travel teams: Northern Pains and Furies. Due to decreased membership all home teams were suspended in 2012, just prior to their fourth season.

It held its first bout in November, drawing more than 1,700 fans. In October 2012, FMDG's former treasurer was convicted of a Class C felony and sentenced to restitution of $10,000, 25 days in jail and one year probation.

Fargo Moorhead was accepted into the Women's Flat Track Derby Association Apprentice Program in April 2011, and became a full member of the WFTDA in March 2012, the first in North Dakota.
