= Detroit Roller Derby =

Roller derby league

- Metro area: Detroit, MI
- Country: United States
- Founded: 2005
- Teams: Travel Teams; Detroit Roller Derby Allstars (A Team); Motor City Disassembly Line (B Team); Motown Wreckers (Pick up team); Home Teams; D-Funk Allstars; Devil's Night Dames; The Detroit Pistoffs; Grand Prix Madonnas
- Track type: Flat
- Venue: Detroit Masonic Temple Drill Hall, Detroit, MI
- Affiliations: WFTDA
- Website: https://www.detroitrollerderby.com/

Detroit Roller Derby (DRD) is a women's flat-track roller derby league based in Detroit, Michigan. The league was formed as Detroit Derby Girls in January 2005 and held their first bouts in February 2006. In November 2016, the league announced it had officially changed its name to Detroit Roller Derby. Detroit Roller Derby is a founding member of the Women's Flat Track Derby Association (WFTDA).

== Teams ==
The Detroit Roller Derby league comprises four home teams: the D-Funk Allstars, the Devil's Night Dames, the Detroit Pistoffs, and the Grand Prix Madonnas. In 2010 the league added the Grand Prix Madonnas and moved venues from the Detroit Masonic Temple to Cobo Arena. Due to renovations at Cobo, the league has returned to the Detroit Masonic Temple, and occasionally hosts games at the Taylor Sportsplex.

The league also has three inter-league travel teams; "A" and "B" all-star teams: The Detroit Roller Derby Allstars, a "C" team: Motor City Disassembly Line (MCDL), and a pick-up style team containing various skill levels: Motown Wreckers.

== WFTDA competition ==
The Detroit Derby Girls finished third in the 2009 WFTDA North Central Regional Tournament, qualifying them to compete in the 2009 National Tournament.

At the 2009 WFTDA National Championships, the DDG faced defending WFTDA champions Gotham Girls Roller Derby in the first round. Gotham won by a score of 187–38, eliminating Detroit from the tournament.

In 2014, Detroit was the first champion of the newly created WFTDA Division 2, defeating Rideau Valley Roller Girls of Ottawa, Canada in the final. In 2015, Detroit hosted a Division 2 playoff tournament, while returning themselves to Division 1 play at Jacksonville, where they placed sixth. In 2016, Detroit finished eighth at the Division 1 tournament hosted in Montreal. At the 2017 Division 1 Playoff in Malmö, Detroit finished outside of the medals after losing their quarterfinal to Gotham Girls Roller Derby.

In 2018, Detroit was the twelfth seed at the WFTDA Playoff in A Coruña, Spain, and ended their weekend with a narrow 224-223 consolation round victory against Sailor City Rollers.

=== Rankings ===
Season	Final ranking	Playoffs	Championship
2006	26	—	N/A
2007	8 E	4 E	R1
2008	N/A	6 E	DNQ
2009	2 NC	2 NC	R1
2010	4 NC	5 NC	DNQ
2011	4 NC	4 NC	DNQ
2012	5 NC	5 NC	DNQ
2013	28 WFTDA	4 D1	DNQ
2014	30 WFTDA	1 D2	1 D2
2015	20 WFTDA	6 D1	DNQ
2016	24 WFTDA	8 D1	DNQ
2017	26 WFTDA	CR D1	DNQ
2018	36 WFTDA	CR	DNQ
2019	33 WFTDA	2 CC East	DNQ

- CR = consolation round
- CC = Continental Cup

== Film appearance ==
A number of skaters of the Detroit Derby Girls appeared in Drew Barrymore's directorial debut film, Whip It!.

Preceded by Jet City Rollergirls	WFTDA Division 2 Championship winners 2014	Succeeded by Sacred City Derby Girls
