= Naptown Roller Derby =

Roller derby league

- Metro area: Indianapolis, Indiana
- Country: United States
- Founded: 2006
- Teams: The Tornado Sirens (A team); The Warning Belles (B team); The 3rd Alarm (C team)
- Track type(s): Flat
- Venue: Indiana Farmers Coliseum; Indiana Convention Center
- Affiliations: WFTDA
- Website: www.naptownrollerderby.com

Naptown Roller Derby (NRD) is a women's flat-track roller derby league based in Indianapolis, Indiana. Founded in 2006, the league started their 10th season in March 2016. Naptown Roller Derby is a member of the Women's Flat Track Derby Association (WFTDA). The home bouts of Naptown Roller Derby are held at the Indiana State Fairgrounds in Indianapolis.

== League history ==
Naptown Roller Girls first formed in 2006, with ad hoc practices in public spaces, and first held a competitive bout in 2007. Naptown was announced as a member of the WFTDA in December 2007. By early 2008 NRG was repeatedly selling out events at the Indiana State Fairgrounds, with nearly 4,500 in attendance on February 9 of that year. Naptown's top attendance mark was 4,978 at the Pepsi Coliseum with average attendance of 3,500 as of 2011.

In 2009, Naptown was the host league for the WFTDA North Central Regional Tournament "Monumental Mayhem', held at the Indiana Convention Center.

In January 2017, the league announced it had changed its name to Naptown Roller Derby as part of an effort to be an "inclusive and supportive environment for skaters and staff."

== Teams ==
The league is composed of three teams at different levels of competitive play: The Tornado Sirens (A-Team), The Warning Belles (B-team) and The Third Alarm (C-team).

== WFTDA competition ==
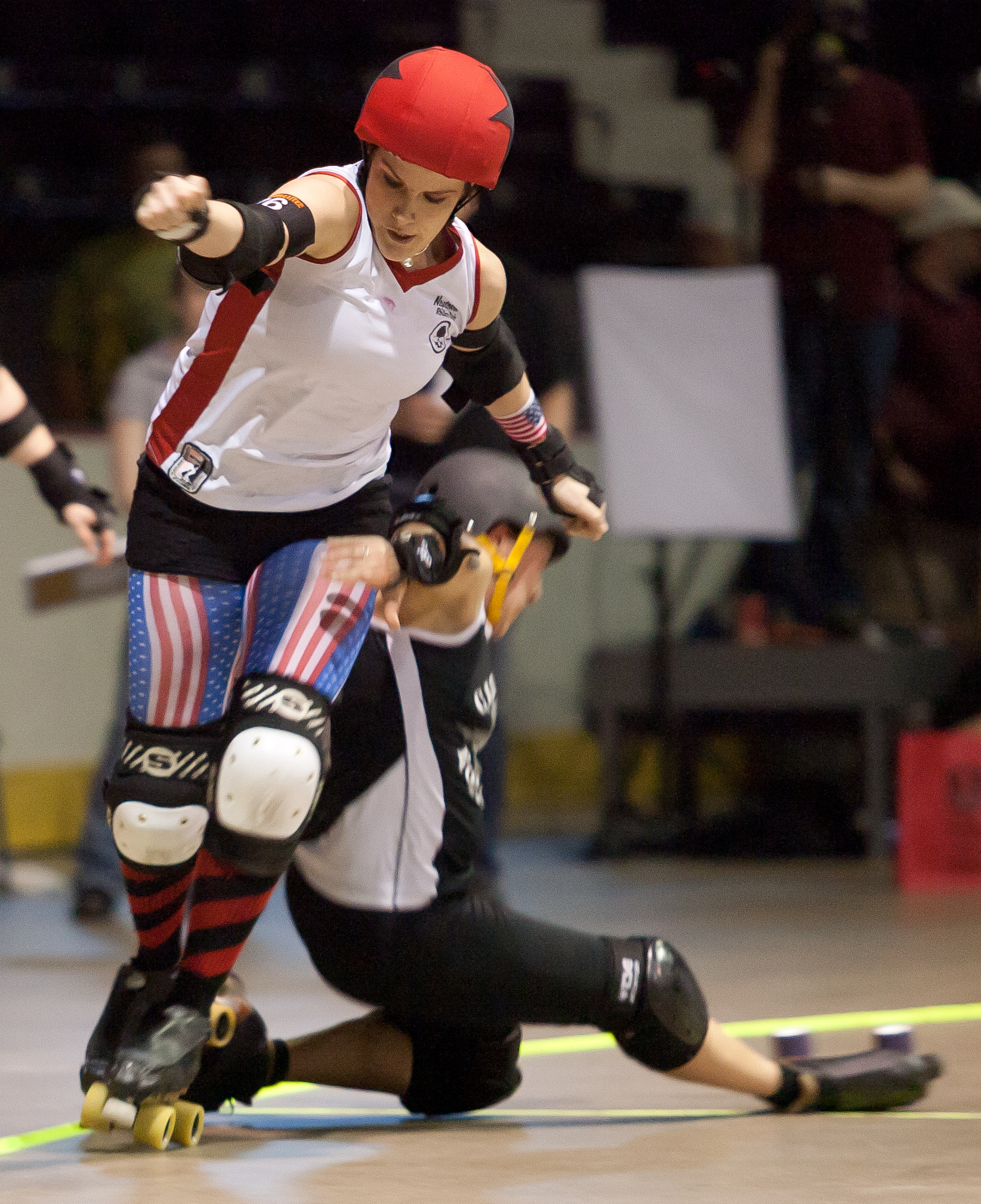
Tornado Sirens jammer Maiden America in 2011

Naptown's WFTDA A team, the Tornado Sirens, has consistently qualified for WFTDA Playoffs at various levels since 2010, including appearances at WFTDA Championships in 2011 and 2012. Naptown qualified for the WFTDA Division 2 Playoffs and Championship in 2017 as the twelfth seed in Pittsburgh, and finished in third place with a 215–144 victory over Dublin Roller Derby. In 2018 the league declined invitation to the WFTDA Playoffs, citing the cost of travel.

=== Rankings ===
Season	Final ranking	Playoffs	Championship
2008	5 NC	DNQ	DNQ
2009	11 NC	DNQ	DNQ
2010	6 NC	6 NC	DNQ
2011	3 NC	3 NC	R1
2012	3 NC	3 NC	QF
2013	12 WFTDA	4 D1	DNQ
2014	27 WFTDA	6 D1	DNQ
2015	46 WFTDA	3 D2	DNQ
2016	31 WFTDA	10 D1	DNQ
2017	45 WFTDA	NA	3 D2
2018	28 WFTDA	DNP	DNQ

- DNP = did not play

== In the community ==
Local brewery Sun King Brewing produces an American brown ale for Naptown called "Naptown Brown".
