= WFTDA North Central Regional Tournament =

- 2009–2012

Tournament information
- Location: Various
- Month played: September/October
- Established: 2009
- Format: Knockout

Current champion
- Windy City Rollers

The WFTDA North Central Regional Tournament or WFTDA North Central Region Playoffs was one of four annual roller derby regional qualifying tournaments for the WFTDA Championships.

The Tournament was organised by the Women's Flat Track Derby Association (WFTDA). Full WFTDA members in the North Central Region were eligible for ranking, and the top ten leagues would qualify for the North Central Regional Tournament, with the top three finalists qualifying for the Championships. Together, the four qualifying tournaments and Championships were termed the "Big 5". Starting with the 2013 WFTDA season, WFTDA's regions were discontinued in favor of an overall-rankings based system, and a new playoff format was created.

== Championships ==
Year	Date	Name	Venue	Champion	Second	Third
2009	18-20 September	Brawl of America	Saint Paul, Minnesota	Windy City Rollers	Mad Rollin' Dolls	Detroit Derby Girls
2010	10-12 September	Thunda on the Tundra	Green Bay, Wisconsin	Windy City Rollers	Minnesota RollerGirls	Mad Rollin' Dolls
2011	30 September-2 October	Monumental Mayhem	Indianapolis, Indiana	Windy City Rollers	Minnesota RollerGirls	Naptown Roller Girls
2012	14-16 September	Thrill of the Spill	Niagara Falls, New York	Windy City Rollers	Minnesota RollerGirls	Naptown Roller Girls

== 2009 Brawl of America ==
On September 20, 2009, the Windy City Rollers defeated the Mad Rollin' Dolls (Dairyland Dolls) 150-56 in the North Central championship bout. The Detroit Derby Girls beat the Cincinnati Rollergirls (Black Sheep) 126-62 to place 3rd.
