= Sports in Newark, New Jersey =

Overview of sports traditions and activities in Newark, New Jersey, United States

Sports in Newark, New Jersey, the second largest city in the New York metropolitan area, are part of the regional professional sports and media markets. The city has hosted many teams and events, though much of its history is without an MLB, NBA, NHL, or NFL team in the city proper. Prudential Center is in Downtown Newark. Sports Illustrated Stadium is just across the Passaic River in Harrison. The Meadowlands Sports Complex is less than 10 miles away from Downtown and reached with the Meadowlands Rail Line via Newark Penn Station or Broad Street Station.

== Professional sports ==
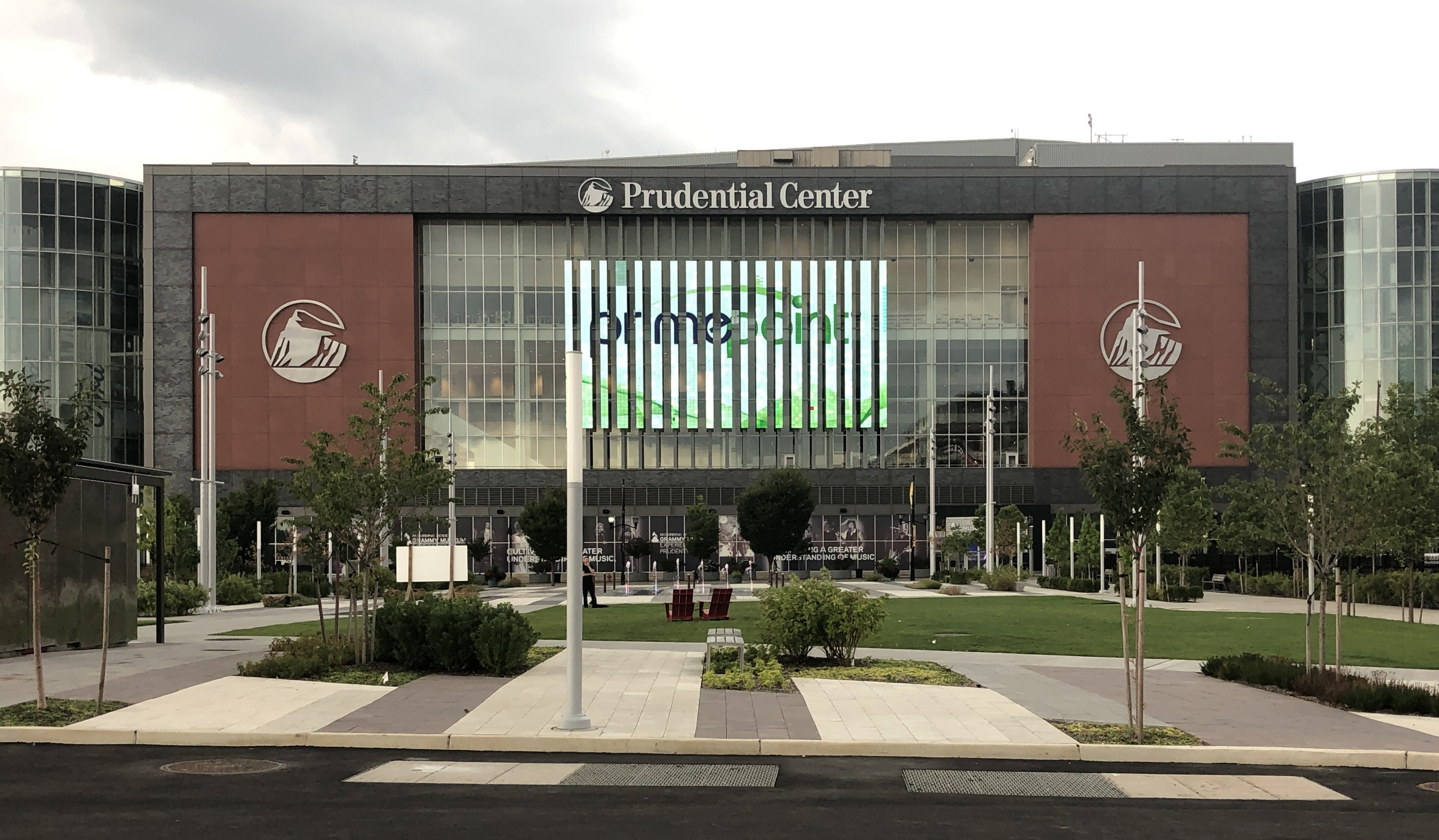
Prudential Center at Mulberry Commons

=== Hockey ===
The New Jersey Devils of the National Hockey League moved in 2007 from the Continental Airlines Arena in the Meadowlands to the Prudential Center, an arena jointly financed by the team and the city. Part of the 2012 Stanley Cup Final were played there. The 2013 NHL entry draft (the 51st NHL entry draft) took place at the Prudential Center on June 30, 2013.

The Metropolitan Riveters of the now defunct National Women's Hockey League played at the Devils' practice facility from 2017 to 2022. Prudential Center is now home to the New York metropolitan area's representative in the Professional Women's Hockey League, the New York Sirens.

Historically, Newark was home to the minor professional Newark Bulldogs, a Canadian-American Hockey League franchise which played one season in 1928-29. The New York Slapshots of the Atlantic Coast Hockey League ended up playing some of their home games at the Ironbound Arena during the 1985–86 season because the venue they were supposed to play at on Staten Island had not been built. The Slapshots' games in Newark were sparsely attended and financial issues forced the team to move to Virginia in the middle of the season.

=== Soccer ===
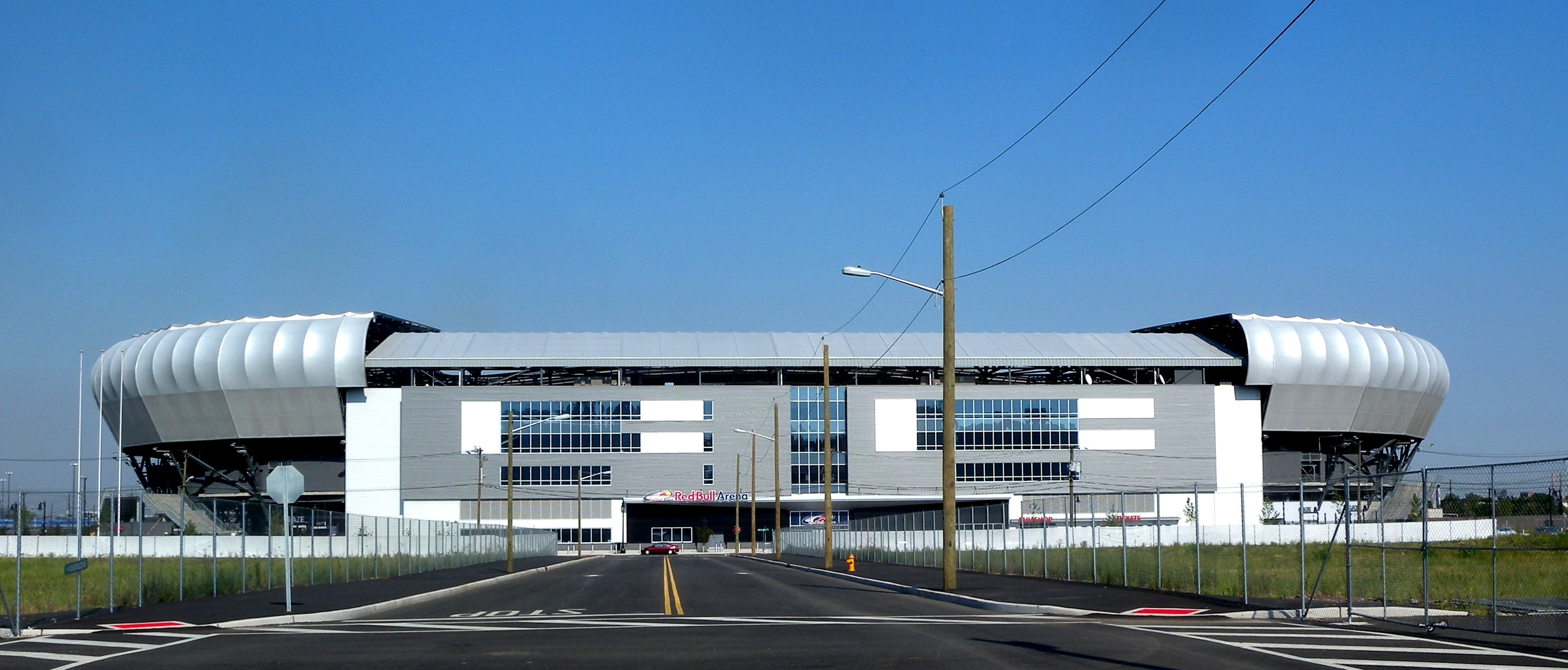

Newark is the transportation hub for the Sports Illustrated Stadium, home stadium of Major League Soccer's Red Bulls, and the NWSL's Gotham FC across the Passaic River from Newark's Riverbank Park in Harrison, with shuttle bus service running from downtown train stations. PATH trains from Newark Penn Station are one stop to nearby Harrison station.

Newark, particularly the Ironbound, and the adjacent West Hudson towns on the Passaic, Harrison and Kearny, have a long tradition of soccer. Kearny's nickname, "Soccer Town USA" is inspired by the era that begin in the mid-1870s, when thousands of Scottish and Irish immigrants settled there after two Scottish companies, Clark Thread Company and Nairn Linoleum, opened. The Newark Portuguese was one of many teams.

Jersey Express S.C. played at the New Jersey Institute of Technology. New Jersey Ironmen was an indoor soccer team of the Major Indoor Soccer League that played at Prudential Center from 2007 to 2009.

=== Baseball ===
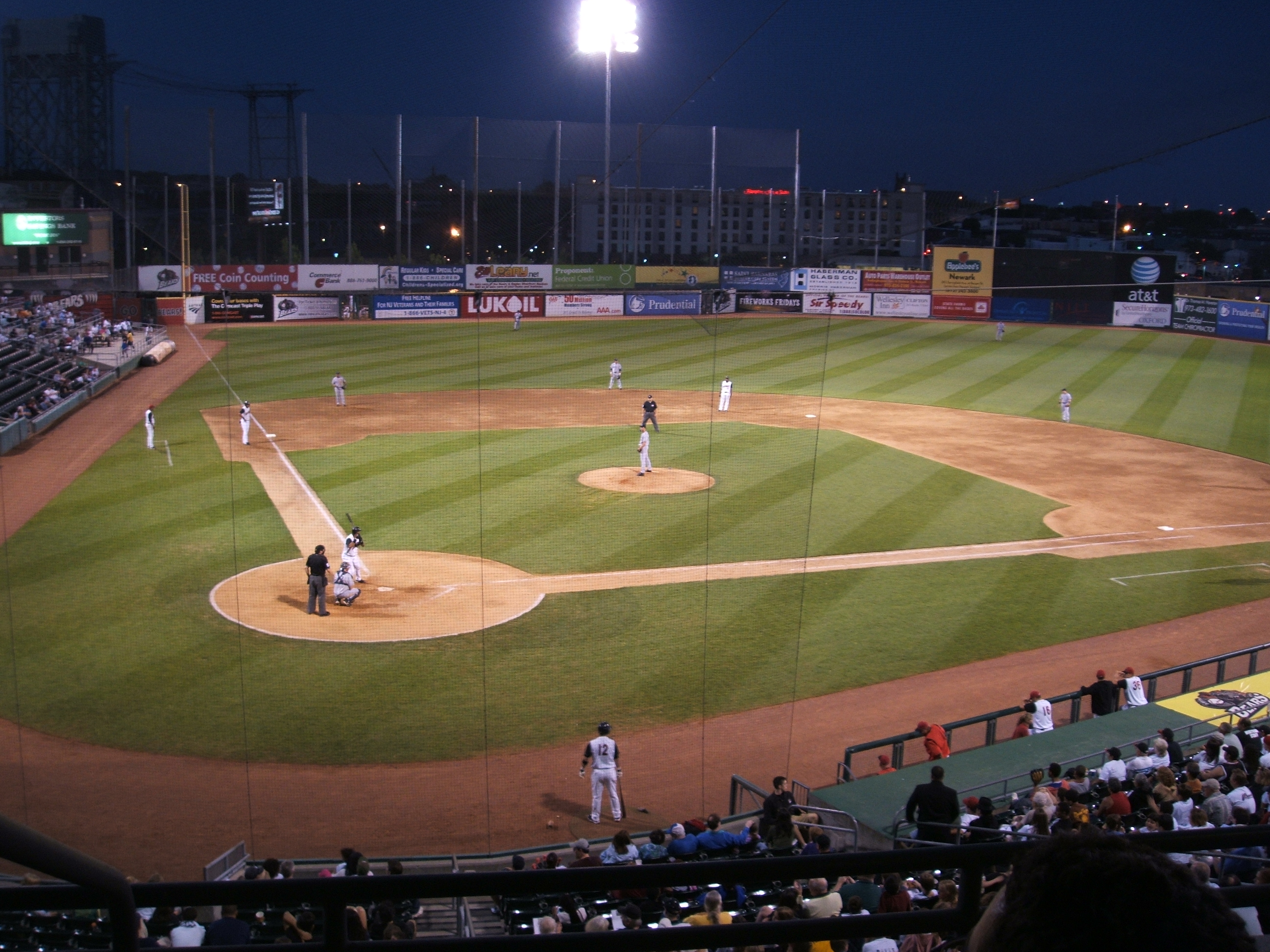
Newark Bears, the last pro team to play in Newark, folded in early 2010s

The Newark Bears were a minor-league professional baseball franchise that were part of the independent Atlantic League (which also includes the Somerset Patriots and the Camden Riversharks). They played at Bears & Eagles Riverfront Stadium, a 6,200-seat ballpark that is also home to local college baseball teams. Both the stadium and team have struggled financially. In November 2013, the future of the team became uncertain as they were unable to commit to a 2014 season and folded shortly thereafter. In 2019, the stadium was demolished to make way for a new development called Riverfront Square.

Baseball in Newark began in the 1850s. The Newark Peppers of the Federal League, played the 1915 season across the river at Harrison Park. The original Newark Bears, a farm team for the New York Yankees played in the International League until the 1949 season playing at Ruppert Stadium. They shared the stadium in the Ironbound with the Negro league's Newark Eagles, managed by Effa Manley. The Bears and Eagles Riverfront Stadium is named for the teams. Newark had eight teams in the National Association of Base Ball Players, including the Newark Eurekas and the Newark Adriatics. Newark was then home to the Newark Indians of the International League.

=== Basketball ===
A team in the American Basketball Association, the Newark Express was introduced to the city in 2005. The team formerly played their home at Essex County College and Drew University in Madison and now plays at East Orange Campus High School.

The New Jersey Nets played two seasons (2010–2012) at the Prudential Center until moving to the Barclays Center in Brooklyn, New York. New York Liberty of the Women's National Basketball Association (WNBA) also played there for three seasons (2011–2013) during renovations of Madison Square Garden in Manhattan, New York.

Both the 2011 NBA draft and 2012 NBA draft were held at the arena.

=== Football ===
The national headquarters of National Football League Alumni is located at One Washington Park in Downtown Newark.

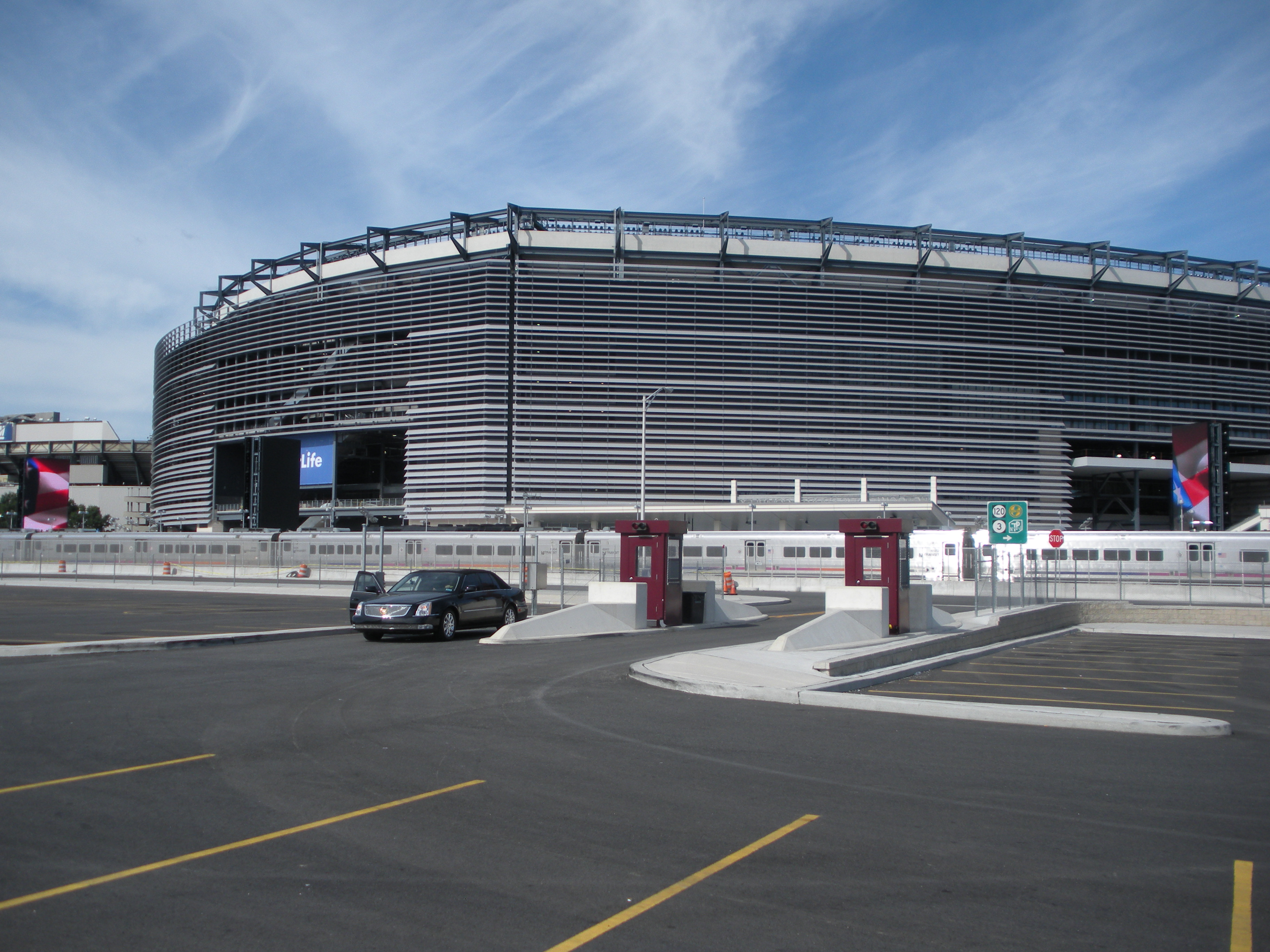
Met Life Stadium and Meadowlands station

Newark was a host city and its airport a gateway for Super Bowl XLVIII which was played on February 2, 2014. The game took place at MetLife Stadium, home of the hosting teams New York Giants and New York Jets, at the nearby Meadowlands Sports Complex, accessible with the Meadowlands Rail Line via Newark Penn Station or Broad Street Station. In anticipation of the convergence of thousands for the events, New Jersey Transit had created a weekly pass for travel throughout the region as well as game-day express bus from the airport. Super Bowl Media Day, kicked off at the Prudential Center on January 28, 2014, with a series of events. The original Vince Lombardi Trophy produced by Tiffany & Co. in Newark in 1967 is displayed at the Newark Museum.

Newark had a team which competed in the first American Football League in 1926, the Newark Bears. The Tornadoes were a long-lived professional American football franchise that existed in some form from 1887 to 1971, having played in the National Football League from 1929 to 1930, the American Association from 1936 to 1941, the Atlantic Coast Football League from 1963 to 1964 and 1970 to 1971, and the Continental Football League from 1965 to 1969. Established in 1946, the Newark Bombers in 1947 moved to Bloomfield and became the Bloomfield Cardinals.

In the modern football era, the Meadowlands was home to the New Jersey Generals of the United States Football League from 1983-85. The USFL was a challenger to the NFL, and featured many of the top professional football players and several future Pro Football Hall of Famers. The Generals roster included Heisman Trophy winners Herschel Walker and Doug Flutie. Despite a disappointing 6-12 inaugural season in 1983, the Generals finished 11-7 and 14-4 the following two seasons, losing in the playoffs to the eventual champion Philadelphia/Baltimore Stars both years. Giants Stadium hosted the 1985 USFL Championship Game, which became the final USFL game ever when the league folded before the start of the 1986 season.

The New York/New Jersey Knights were the metro area's entry in the World League of American Football, a developmental league introduced by the NFL in 1991. The league featured ten teams in five countries, including three in Europe. The team drew respectable crowds in their two-year stay in New Jersey, including a Giants Stadium crowd of 41,219 against the London Monarchs in 1992. The league took a hiatus in 1993, and when it returned its six franchises were all located in Europe.

The Meadowlands also hosted a trio of short-lived teams in other nationwide professional leagues since, including the New York/New Jersey Hitmen of the original XFL (2001), the New York Sentinels of the United Football League (2009), and the New York Guardians of the second incarnation of the XFL (2020). The original XFL folded after one season, and its successor shut down due to COVID and has yet to return.

The New Jersey Titans of the Women's Spring Football League Women's Spring Football League#11-woman division play at Belleville Municipal Stadium in adjacent Belleville.

=== Roller Derby ===
Garden State Roller Derby is a flat track roller derby league based in the city that was founded in 2006, it has three home teams, and two travel teams which compete against teams from other leagues. Garden State Roller Derby is a member of the Women's Flat Track Derby Association (WFTDA).

=== Mixed martial arts ===
EliteXC: Primetime was a mixed martial arts event promoted by Elite Xtreme Combat that took place on May 31, 2008, at the Prudential Center. The main card aired live on CBS, marking the first time an MMA event aired in primetime on major American network television.

The UFC held UFC 78 on November 17, 2007, one of the first events to take place at the new arena. It also played host to UFC 111, which took place on March 27, 2010. On March 19, 2011, it hosted UFC 128, and hosted UFC 159 on April 27, 2013.

Ultimate Fighting Championship's UFC 169: Cruz vs. Barao, mixed martial arts event will also be in at the Prudential Center during Super Bowl week on February 1.

=== Boxing and wrestling ===
Until the 1920s the Newark Armory was a major venue for boxing. The Laurel Garden Arena, in the Central Ward, operated as a sports venue from the 1920s until its closing, hosted numerous boxing and wrestling matches, and was also important music venue. Newark produced many fighters during The Golden Age of the American Jewish Boxer. In the 1930s many Jewish prizefighters once in the employ of crime boss Longie Zwillman became part of the Minuteman, a group dedicated to preventing Nazi activities in the city. Day of the Fight, the first picture directed by Stanley Kubrick, shows Irish-American middleweight Walter Cartier during the height of his career, on the day of a fight with Bobby James, which took place on April 17, 1950, at Laurel Garden. One of the last bouts in Laurel Garden-era was on May 30, 1953, in which Joey Giardello defeated middleweight Hurley Sandler in a nationally televised event.

=== Gymnastics ===
The AT&T American Cup, an annual elite senior level international gymnastics competition, was held at Prudential Center in 2016 and 2017.

== College sports ==
The Seton Hall Pirates men's basketball program is the NCAA Division I intercollegiate men's basketball program of Seton Hall University in South Orange. The team competes in the Big East Conference and plays their home games at the Prudential Center. In 2011, the GoNewarkHoopFest was hosted by Seton Hall University for the East Regional playoffs of the 2011 NCAA Men's Division I Basketball Tournament.

The Rutgers–Newark Scarlet Raiders field teams for NCAA competition in 14 Division III sports (7 each for men and women): men's and women's basketball, men's and women's cross country, men's and women's soccer, men's and women's tennis, men's and women's track and field, men's and women's volleyball, baseball (men) and softball (women). The Scarlet Raiders are members of the New Jersey Athletic Conference (NJAC) and the Eastern Intercollegiate Volleyball Association. Built in 1977, the Golden Dome Athletic Center is the hub of Rutgers–Newark athletics, seating 2,000. Soccer, baseball, and softball games are held on Alumni Field.

The New Jersey Institute of Technology's sports teams are called the NJIT Highlanders. NJIT's athletic teams compete in the NCAA Division I (full membership officially September 1, 2009). They play in the ASUN Conference. The men's volleyball team plays in the Eastern Intercollegiate Volleyball Association (EIVA) conference, the men's swimming team plays in the Coastal Collegiate Swimming Association. The club-level ice hockey team plays in the Great Northeast Collegiate Hockey Conference. The Fleisher Center was replaced by the Wellness and Events Center as the school's athletic center.

Essex County College teams are represented in the Garden State Athletic Conference (GSAC) and Region 19 of the National Junior College Athletic Association.

== High-school basketball and soccer ==
Saint Benedict's Preparatory School basketball team, coach by Dan Hurley between 2001 and 2010, consistently ranks as one of the top high-school basketball teams in the United States among USA Today High School Boys Basketball Super 25. and is part of the "NBA Pipeline".

St. Benedict's had the top-ranked high school soccer team in the nation by ESPN/Rise in 1990, 1997–98, 2001, 2005–06 and 2011. Numerous alumni of the soccer program at St. Benedict's have become world-renowned players.

== Statues ==
In 2009, a 22 ft (6.7 m) stainless steel sculpture of a hockey player was installed at Championship Plaza at Prudential Center. A bronze statue, created by sculptor Thomas Jay Warren, was dedicated to the memory of Althea Gibson in Branch Brook Park in March 2012 "I hope that I have accomplished just one thing," she once wrote, "that I have been a credit to tennis, and to my country." "By all measures," reads the inscription "Althea Gibson certainly attained that goal." In June 2012, a life-size bronze statue of Roberto Clemente was also unveiled in the park. The Salute, created by Jon Krawczyk, is a statue of the longtime New Jersey Devils goaltender Martin Brodeur was installed at Prudential Center in 2016.

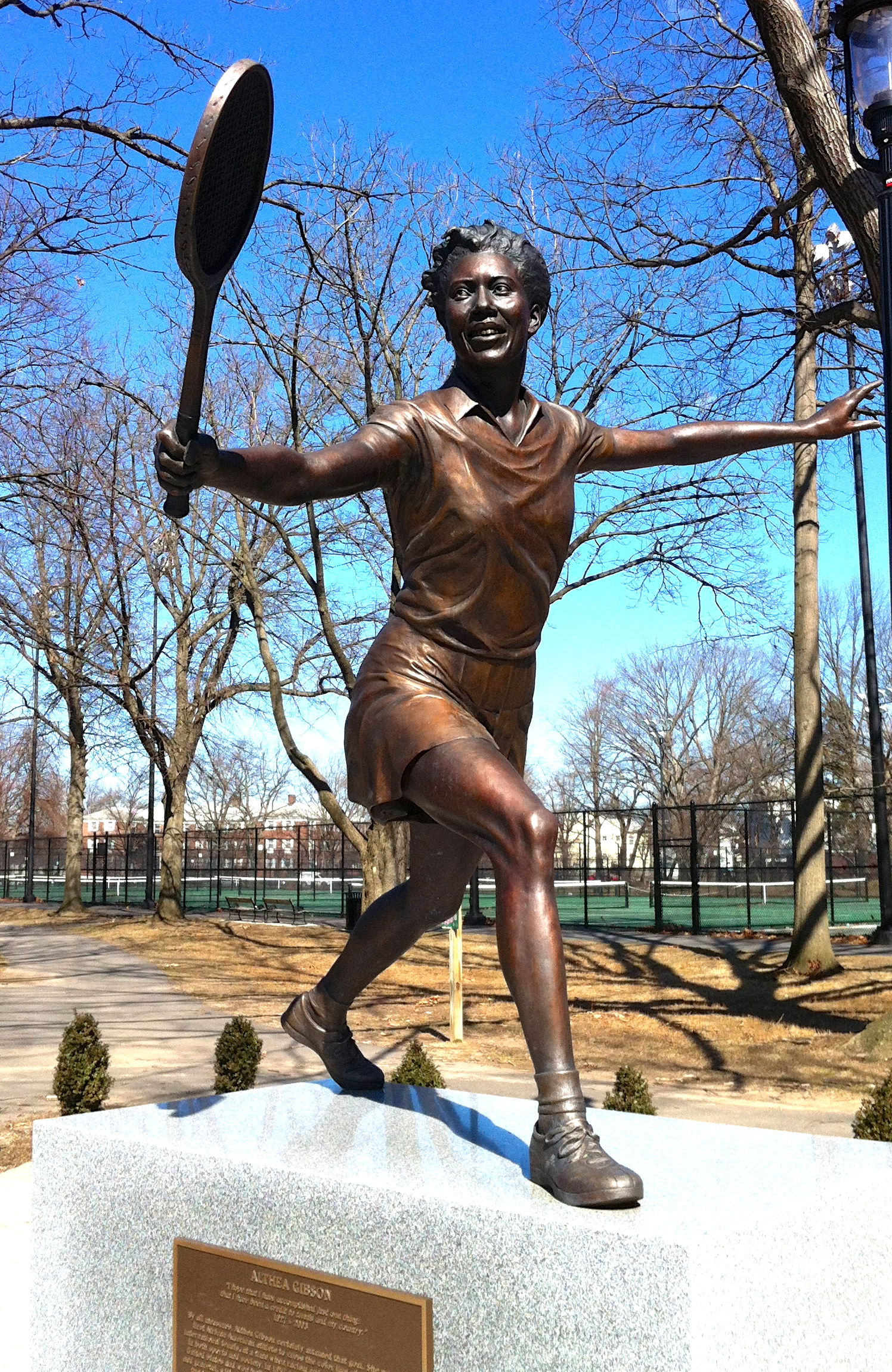
Althea Gibson

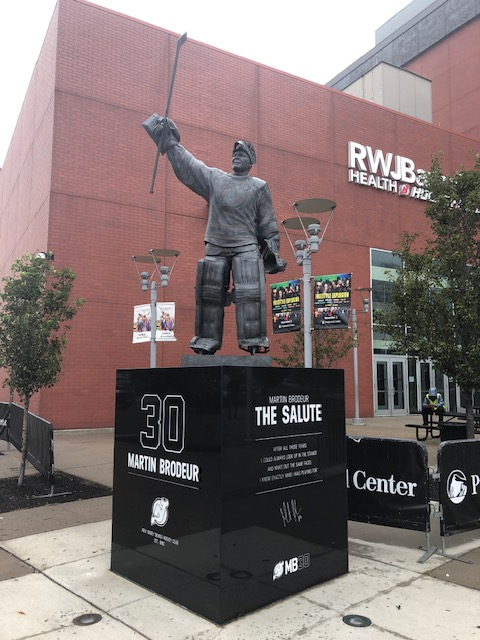
Martin Brodeur

== See also ==
- BCR (Brick City Rock)
- List of people from Newark, New Jersey
- Newark Schools Stadium
- Sports in New Jersey
- Sports in Jersey City, New Jersey
- List of college athletic programs in New Jersey
- Timeline of Newark, New Jersey history
