= Fleisher Center =

Former arena in Newark, New Jersey, US

Coordinates: 40°44′35.25″N 74°10′55.78″W

The Estelle & Zoom Fleisher Athletic Center was a 1,600-seat multi-purpose arena in Newark, New Jersey, USA.

Built in 1967, it was the home of the New Jersey Institute of Technology Highlanders men's and women's basketball, volleyball, fencing and swim teams until the Wellness and Events Center opened.

The multi-purpose arena had a main hall area with three basketball/volleyball courts which could be independently partitioned for simultaneous tournament hosting and practice. Other amenities includes a medical clinic, a 25-yard indoor swimming pool, a fitness center, two weight rooms, sauna, training room, locker rooms, racquetball courts and a two-lane jogging track.

NJIT played its last game at the arena on February 23, 2017, an 88–87 win over USC Upstate in front of a crowd of 677. The team has since moved to the new Wellness and Events Center starting with the 2018-19 season.

== See also ==
- Golden Dome Athletic Center
- List of college athletic programs in New Jersey
- List of NCAA Division I basketball arenas
- History of sports in Newark, New Jersey
- Sports in New Jersey
