= Golden Dome Athletic Center =

Sports venue in Newark, New Jersey

Coordinates: 40.7387°N 74.1784°W

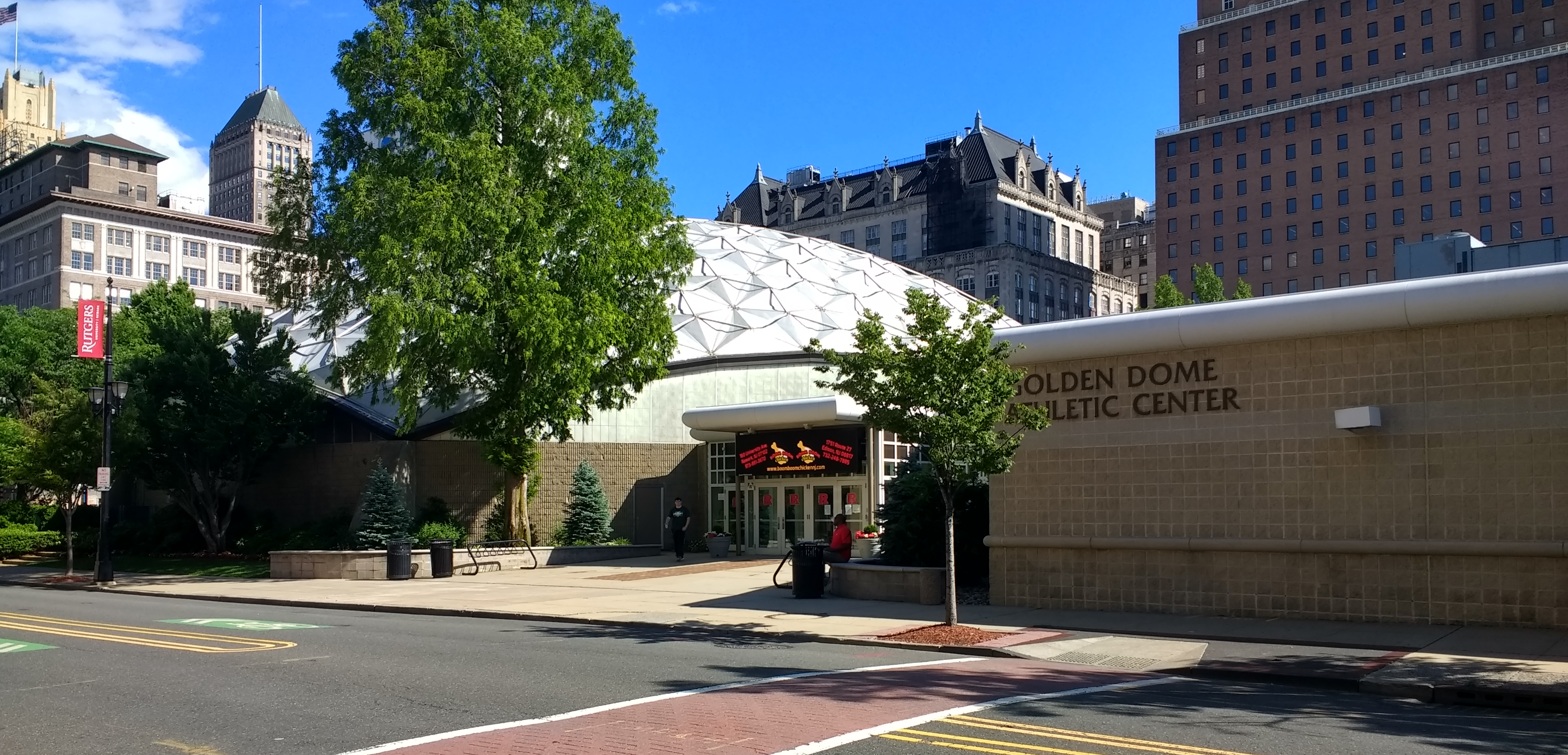
Golden Dome Athletic Center

The Golden Dome Athletic Center in Newark, New Jersey is the hub of Rutgers–Newark athletics and teams, the Scarlet Raiders. It is located at 42 Warren Street between Downtown and University Heights. Built in 1977, it seats 2,000. The facility includes two gyms, five outdoor tennis courts, four racquetball courts, an exercise/dance studio and a 25-yard, eight-lane pool.

Fredrick Douglass Field (formerly known as Alumni Field) across the street is the venue for NCAA softball and soccer games. The baseball team formerly played at the since demolished Bears & Eagles Riverfront Stadium. Weequahic Park in Newark now serves as the site for baseball team's home games.

== See also ==
- Fleisher Center
- Wellness and Events Center
- List of college athletic programs in New Jersey
- History of sports in Newark, New Jersey
- Sports in New Jersey
