= List of professional sports teams in New Jersey =

New Jersey is the 11th most populated state in the United States and has a rich history of professional sports.

== Active teams ==
=== Major league teams ===
New Jersey is home to four major professional sports teams. Two of the teams are located in East Rutherford, one is in Harrison, one is in Newark.

American football
League	Team	City	Stadium	Capacity
NFL	New York Giants	East Rutherford	MetLife Stadium	82,500
NFL	New York Jets	East Rutherford	MetLife Stadium	82,500
Ice Hockey
League	Team	City	Arena	Capacity
NHL	New Jersey Devils	Newark	Prudential Center	16,514
Soccer
League	Team	City	Stadium	Capacity
MLS	New York Red Bulls	Harrison	Sports Illustrated Stadium	25,000

=== Other professional sports teams ===
Baseball
League	Team	City	Stadium	Capacity
EL (AA)	Somerset Patriots	Bridgewater	TD Bank Ballpark	6,100
SAL (High-A)	Jersey Shore BlueClaws	Lakewood	ShoreTown Ballpark	6,588
FL (Ind.)	New Jersey Jackals	Paterson	Hinchliffe Stadium	7,500
FL (Ind.)	Sussex County Miners	Augusta	Skylands Stadium	4,200
Ice hockey
League	Team	City	Arena	Capacity
PWHL	New York Sirens	Newark	Prudential Center	16,514
Soccer
League	Team	City	Stadium	Capacity
MLSNP	New York Red Bulls II	Montclair	MSU Soccer Park at Pittser Field	5,000
USL1	New York Cosmos	Paterson	Hinchliffe Stadium	7,500
NWSL	Gotham FC	Harrison	Sports Illustrated Stadium	25,000

=== Map of cities with a professional sports team ===
Location with a professional sports team

== See also ==
- Sports in New Jersey
