= GSAC =

GSAC may refer to:

== College athletic conferences ==
- The Garden State Athletic Conference, an athletic conference affiliated within the National Junior College Athletic Association (NJCAA), located in New Jersey, Delaware and Pennsylvania.
- The Great Southwest Athletic Conference (formerly known as the Golden State Athletic Conference), an athletic conference affiliated within the National Association of Intercollegiate Athletics (NAIA), located in California and Arizona
- The Great South Athletic Conference, a defunct athletic conference affiliated within the Division III ranks of the National Collegiate Athletic Association (NCAA), located in Alabama, Georgia, Tennessee and North Carolina.
