= The Streak (Easton High School Wrestling) =

The Streak was a period of 68 years, spanning from 1948 to 2015, in which Easton Area High School in Easton, Pennsylvania produced at least one individual Eastern Pennsylvania Athletic Conference district champion in high school wrestling.

From 1948 to 2015, Easton had 185 individual district wrestling champions, and at least one district champion in each of these years. Competing in Pennsylvania's Eastern Pennsylvania Conference, a district that has long been regarded as one of the most competitive wrestling districts in the nation,

Easton High School's 68-year streak was considered to a testament to the program's consistent excellence.

The Easton wrestling streak, which began in 1948, ended February 27, 2016, when it failed to produce a district champion.

== District champions by year ==
Year

Year	Wrestler (weightclass)	State Champion	NCAA All American
1948	Dick Rutt (105)		
1948	Qunidi Pompilli (114)		
1948	Charles Debellis (129)		
1948	Mario DiVietro (156)		
1949	Santo Calcagnetti (95)		
1949	Dick Rutt (103)		
1949	Clair Rutt (112)		
1949	Qunidi Pompilli (120)		
1949	Charles Debellis (133)		
1949	Jim Mangino (138)		
1949	Gene Abbott (145)		
1949	Claude Danner (165)		
1949	Tom Riehl (185)		
1950	Dick Finelli (95)	✓	
1950	Harry Cather (103)		
1950	Jim Mangino (145)		
1951	Jack Uhler (95)		
1951	Dick Finelli (103)		
1951	Harry Cathers (112)		
1951	Gus Basso (120)		
1951	Dan Finelli (127)		
1951	Sam Divetro (138)		
1951	Art Cathers (145)		
1951	Oscar Dorsey (154)		
1951	Art Schaeffer (HWT)		
1952	Dick Finelli (115)		
1952	Gus Basso (123)		
1952	Al Zarbatany (136)		
1952	Sam Divietro (141)		
1953	Joseph Piscitello (145)		
1953	Bill Schaeffer (HWT)		
1954	Tom Gaines (97)		
1954	Larry Gaines (114)		
1954	Charles Dentith (147)		
1955	Larry Gaines (122)		
1955	Nido Collina (140)		
1955	John Divetro (167)		
1956	Gino Delorenzo (147)		
1957	Ted Sulkin (105)		
1958	Malcom Purdy (97)		
1958	Bill Kelley (135)		
1958	Phil Richards (140)		
1959	John Vincent (105)		
1959	Bill Kelley (140)		
1960	John Vincent (114)		
1960	Malcom Purdy (122)		
1961	Malcom Purdy (122)		
1961	Dick Dewalt (129)		
1961	Larry Callair (HWT)		
1962	Alton Boyer (98)	✓	
1962	Jim Balsco (106)		
1962	Dick Dewalt (136)	✓	
1962	Willie Falwell (148)		
1963	Ray Ferarro (115)		
1964	Bob Ferarro (98)		✓
1964	Don Doll (106)		
1964	Chuck Amato (168)	✓	
1965	Bob Ferarro (115)		✓
1965	Rueben Roberts (123)		
1965	Steve Diacount (183)		
1966	Bob *Ferarro (130)		✓
1967	Dwight Dansor (115)		
1968	Bob Pratt (130)		
1968	Craig Fox (136)	✓	
1968	Barry Snyder (141)		
1969	Ed Gigliotti (106)		
1969	Chico Lutes (115)	✓	
1969	Bob Pratt (130)		
1969	Barry Snyder (141)		
1969	Mike Capobainco (148)		
1970	Brad Weaver (98)		
1970	Larry Davis (136)		
1971	Ed Kovacs (91)		
1971	Rocky Creazzo (98)	✓	
1971	Brad Weaver (106)		
1972	Greg Shoemaker (88)		
1972	Rocky Creazzo (95)		
1972	Tom Heilman (180)		
1973	Greg Shoemaker (98)		
1973	Rocky Creazzo (103)		
1973	Russ Snyder (132)		
1973	Darwin Brodt (167)		
1973	Lee Guzzo (185)		
1974	Greg *Shoemaker (105)		
1974	Brain Lutz (119)		
1974	Russ Snyder (138)		
1974	Darwin Brodt (167)	✓	
1974	Lee Guzzo (185)		
1975	Bobby Weaver (98)	✓	
1975	Fred Stoelzl (132)		
1975	Jim Palmer (HWT)		
1976	Bobby Weaver (98)	✓	
1977	Bobby Weaver (105)	✓	
1977	Dave Smith (132)		
1978	Rick Scarpantino (145)		
1978	Dan Kasperkoski (HWT)		
1979	Dan Kasperkoski (HWT)		
1980	John Cuvo (98)	✓	
1980	Randy Ascani (119)		
1980	Pete Stoelzl (126)		
1981	Randy Ascani (119)	✓	
1981	Pete Stoelzl (126)		
1981	Barry Rutt (138)		
1981	Chip Easterday (167)		

1982

Jack Cuvo (98)

1983

Jack *Cuvo (98)
Jody Karam (155)

1984

Jack Cuvo (98)
Mark Benton (105)
Brian McIntyre (126)
Jerry Hulbert (132)

1985

Jack *Cuvo (105)
Jerry Hulbert (138)
Jeff Karam (155)

1986

Trevor Purdy (126)
Mike Disora (132)

1987

Doug Hager (112)

1988

Moss *Grays (132)

1989

Moss *Grays (135)
Dave Disora (140)
Tony Rizzolino (152)

1990

Steve Calandra (130)
Moss Grays (145)
Dan Goffredo (171)

1991

Greg Geiger (140)

1992

Gino *Cerulli (103)

1993

Eric Thompson (160)

1994

Eric Thompson (160)

1995

Jamarr Billman (112)

1996

Willie Saylor (103)
Chris Kelly (112)
Gary Rute (119)
Bryan Snyder (125)
Jamarr Billman (130)
Rich Morris (135)
Eric Greshko (140)

1997

Chris Kelly (112)
Bryan Snyder (135)
Jamarr Billman (140)

1998

Gino Fortebuono (112)

1999

Matt Ciasulli (103)

2000

Chad Sportelli (103)
Jake Giamoni (135)
Ryan Kilpatrick (171)

2001

Chad Sportelli (103)
Matt Ciasulli (119)
Dan Brown (140)
Ryan Kilpatrick (160)
Justin Mclennan (189)

2002

Alex Krom (103)
Matt Ciasulli (125)
Matt Lear (152)

2003

Seth Ciasulli (103)
Alex Krom (112)
Mike Rogers (140)

2004

Mike Rogers (152)
Sean Richmond (160)
Jason Groller (275)

2005

Jordan Oliver (103)
Brad Gentzle (119)
Alex Krom (135)
Zach Pizarro (189)

2006

Jordan Oliver (103)
Russ Souders (119)
Ju Ju Drummond (125)
Braylin Williams (140)

2007

Desmond Moore (103)
Kegan Handlovic (112)
Jordan Oliver (119)

2008

Kegan Handlovic (119)
Jordan Oliver (130)
Chris Wilson (215)

2009

Chris Wilson (215)
Justin Grant (285)

2010

Mitchell Minotti (130)
Joe Rizzolino (135)

2011

Joe Rizzolino (135)
Mitchell Minotti (140)

2012

Mitchell Minotti (145)
Tyler Greene (182)

2013

Robbie Rizzolino (132)
Evan DiSora (160)

2014

Elijah Brown (152)

2015

Evan Fidelibus (132)
Jimmy Saylor (145)

== Years with only one champion ==
Of the 68 years in the streak, there were 17 seasons in which the streak was sustained by just one champion:

1956

Gino Delorenzo (147)

1957

Ted Sulkin (105)

1963

Ray Ferarro (115)

1966

Bob *Ferarro (130)

1967

Dwight Dansor (115)

1976

Bobby Weaver (98)

1979

Dan Kasperkoski (HWT)

1987

Doug Hager (112)

1988

Moss *Grays (132)

1991

Greg Geiger (140)

1992

Gino *Cerulli (103)

1993

Eric Thompson (125)

1994

Eric Thompson (119)

1995

Jamarr Billman (112)

1998

Gino Fortebuono (112)

1999

Matt Ciasulli (103)

2014

Elijah Brown (152)

== Notable Easton High School wrestlers who contributed to the streak ==
- Chuck Amato, former head college football coach, North Carolina State
- Jordan Oliver, two-time Division I NCAA Champion, Three Time NCAA Finalist, Four Time All American (Oklahoma State)
- Bobby Weaver, Olympic Gold Medalist (1984), two-time Olympian (1980, 1984), Olympic Alternate (1976), world champion (1979), NCAA Division I All American (Lehigh)
- Bryan Snyder, two-time NCAA Division I runner-up, four-time NCAA All-American (Nebraska)
