= Charlotte Speed Demons =

Roller derby team in North Carolina, US

- Metro area: Charlotte, North Carolina
- Country: United States
- Founded: 2010
- Dissolved: 2012
- Teams: Charlotte Speed Demons
- Track type: Flat
- Venue: Metrolina Tradshow Expo
- Affiliations: USARS

The Charlotte Speed Demons was a women’s flat track roller derby team based in Charlotte, North Carolina, United States.

== History ==
The Charlotte Speed Demons was a women’s flat track roller derby team based in Charlotte, North Carolina, US. Established in 2010, the team was owned and operated by Race City Roller Derby, Inc. The team is part of the movement to develop roller derby into a professional level sport with an eye on inclusion in the Olympic Games. Unfortunately, the team dissolved just two years later.

The Charlotte Speed Demons competed with their legal names while the majority of skaters in the Women's Flat Track Derby Association (WFTDA) compete using "derby names" or stage names.

On June 15, 2010, the team held its first practice at Sports Connection in Charlotte, North Carolina.

On December 4, 2010, in front of a full house of 600, the team competed in its first game held at the First Ward Recreation Center in Charlotte, NC. They faced off against the Gate City Roller Girls of Greensboro, North Carolina, and took a 185–65 victory.

In 2011, the team’s first full season, it held home games at the First Ward Recreation Center. The schedule, which ran from February 26 to September 25, had six home games and one away.

On April 16, 2011, the Charlotte Speed Demons, along with its opponent Mother State Roller Derby, made history. With players on both teams using their legal names, it marked the first all legal name roller derby game in modern history. Games have been played with at least one team using legal names but never with all players doing so.

In September 2011, the Charlotte Speed Demons were selected by USA Roller Sports (USARS), the national governing body of Roller Sports in the United States and recognized by the United States Olympic Committee (USOC), to hold a beta test for a new roller derby rules set being developed for the Olympic Games.

On October 2, 2011, the Charlotte Speed Demons, along with its opponent the Greenville Derby Dames, competed in a non-public game at Kate’s Skating Rink in Gastonia, North Carolina, using the new USARS roller derby rules set. The Charlotte Speed Demons took a 227–136 victory. Feedback from this game was instrumental in the further development of the rules set.

After playing teams from North Carolina, South Carolina and Virginia, the Charlotte Speed Demons ended the 2011 season with a 3–4 record.

For the 2012 season, the Charlotte Speed Demons held its home games at Metrolina Tradeshow Expo.

The team dissolved after the end of their 2012 season.

== See also ==
- Roller derby
- History of roller derby
- Roller Derby in the United States
