= Bryan Snyder =

American wrestler and coach (born 1979)

Personal information
- Full name: Bryan M. Snyder
- Born: June 15, 1979 (age 47)

Sport
- Country: United States
- Sport: Wrestling
- Weight class: 157 lb (71 kg)
- Event: Folkstyle
- College team: Nebraska
- Coached by: Mark Manning
- Now coaching: Nebraska (AHC)
Medal record
Collegiate Wrestling
Representing the Nebraska Cornhuskers
NCAA Division I Championships
Silver medal – second place	2001 Iowa City	157 lbs
Silver medal – second place	2002 Albany	157 lbs
Big 12 Championships
Gold medal – first place	1999 Ames	157 lb
Gold medal – first place	2000 Lincoln	157 lb
Gold medal – first place	2001 Stillwater	157 lb
Gold medal – first place	2002 Norman	157 lb
- Updated on January 29, 2025

Bryan M. Snyder (born June 15, 1979) is an American former folkstyle wrestler who currently serves as the associate head coach of the Nebraska Cornhuskers.

== Amateur wrestling career ==
=== High school ===
Snyder attended Easton Area High School (EAHS) in Easton, Pennsylvania where he was a three-time Pennsylvania Interscholastic Athletic Association (PIAA) state placer. He won the 135-pound PIAA state championship during his senior year in 1997. He also helped keep The Streak alive for EAHS by winning PIAA District 11 titles in 1996 and 1997. Snyder finished his high school career with a 112–12 record.

=== College ===
Snyder committed to the University of Nebraska–Lincoln as the top recruit at 134 pounds.

==== 1997–1998 ====
Snyder redshirted during the 1997–98 season, wrestling unattached at 142 and 150 pounds. He compiled a 6–2 record and a first place finish at the UNK Hardees Open.

==== 1998–1999 ====
Snyder entered the 1998–99 season as the Nebraska starter at 157 pounds. On January 11, 1999, Snyder was named Big 12 Wrestler of the Week after going 4–0 and winning the Great Plains Open. Snyder went into the 1999 Big 12 Wrestling Championships with a 26–3 record, earning the first seed despite having a rib injury. Snyder won his first round match before defeating David Maldonado in the championship match, becoming the fourth Nebraska freshman to win a conference title. Snyder was the fifth seed at the 1999 NCAA Division I Wrestling Championships, winning his first three matches before losing to Casey Cunningham in the semifinals. Snyder would then defeat Chris Ayres in the consolation semifinals before losing to Larry Quisel in the third-place match. Snyder became the second-highest-finishing Nebraska freshman with his fourth-place result and the third to earn All-American status. Snyder finished his freshman season with a 32–5 record.

==== 1999–2000 ====
On December 19, 1999, Snyder won the Reno Tournament of Champions after going 4–0 and defeating Larry Quisel in the finals. On December 30, Snyder went 4–2 to finish fourth at the Midlands Tournament. On February 7, 2000, Snyder defeated Eric Jorgensen to win the NWCA All-Star Classic. At the 2000 Big 12 Wrestling Championships, Snyder defeated Shane Roller in the first round before David Kjeldgaard forfeited out of the championship bout due to an aggravated knee injury making Snyder the 157-pound champion. Entering the 2000 NCAA Division I Wrestling Championships, Snyder had a 19-match win streak and was favored to win the 157-pound title, but was upset by Shaun Shapert in the first round of the tournament. Snyder would then win five straight matches before being defeated by T.J. Williams in the consolation semifinals but would bounce back and defeat Luke Becker to finish fifth in the tournament while earning All-American status. Snyder finished his junior season with a 43–3 record and a dual mark of 18–0. His 43 wins tied him for second in Nebraska history for a single season and his dual winning percentage (100.0%) tied Gil Sanchez who achieved the same feat during the 1986–87 season.

On May 21, 2000, the Big 12 All-Stars faced the Korean University National Team with Snyder defeating Hong Kyung-Rae by a 10–4 decision.

==== 2000–2001 ====
On December 18, 2000, Snyder was named Big 12 Wrestler of the Week after two bonus point wins. At the 2001 Big 12 Wrestling Championships, Snyder again won his first round match before defeating Cole Sanderson in the finals to become Nebraska's second three-time conference champion. Snyder earned the second-seed for the 2001 NCAA Division I Wrestling Championships, winning his first two matches via falls before picking up decision wins over Cole Sanderson and Luke Becker to advance to the finals against T.J. Williams. Snyder would be defeated in double overtime to finish as the runner-up in the tournament. Snyder finished his junior season with a 28–2 record.

==== 2001–2002 ====
On January 15, 2002, Snyder was named Big 12 Wrestler of the Week after defeating third-ranked Luke Becker.

== Coaching career ==
=== Harvard (2002–03) ===
On July 18, 2002, Snyder was named an assistant coach at Harvard.

=== Nebraska (2003–05) ===
In 2003, Snyder became a graduate assistant for Nebraska.

=== Arizona State (2009–10) ===
On July 29, 2009, Arizona State hired Snyder as their head assistant coach.

=== Nebraska (2010–) ===
On June 15, 2010, Snyder returned to Nebraska as an assistant coach. Before the start of the 2014–15 season, Snyder was promoted to associate head coach under head coach Mark Manning. In 2017, Manning and Snyder were named winners of the Terry McCann Award as USA Wrestling Freestyle Co-Coaches of the Year after being the personal coaches of gold medalist Jordan Burroughs and silver medalist James Green at the 2017 World Wrestling Championships in Paris, France.

== NCAA Championships record ==
NCAA Division I Championships Matches
Res.	Record	Opponent	Score	Date	Event
2002 NCAA Championships (silver) at 157 lbs
Loss	18–6	Luke Becker	TB 4–5	March 21–23, 2002	2002 NCAA Division I Championships
Win	18–5	Shane Roller	5–2	March 21–23, 2002	2002 NCAA Division I Championships
Win	17–5	Gray Maynard	Fall	March 21–23, 2002	2002 NCAA Division I Championships
Win	16–5	Tony Overstake	TF 25–10	March 21–23, 2002	2002 NCAA Division I Championships
Win	15–5	Warren Stout	TF 25–10	March 21–23, 2002	2002 NCAA Division I Championships
2001 NCAA Championships (silver) at 157 lbs
Loss	14–5	T.J. Williams	TB 2–3	March 15–17, 2001	2001 NCAA Division I Championships
Win	14–4	Luke Becker	3–2	March 15–17, 2001	2001 NCAA Division I Championships
Win	13–4	Cole Sanderson	7–2	March 15–17, 2001	2001 NCAA Division I Championships
Win	12–4	Gray Maynard	Fall	March 15–17, 2001	2001 NCAA Division I Championships
Win	11–4	Sulieman Mumin	Fall	March 15–17, 2001	2001 NCAA Division I Championships
2000 NCAA Championships 5th at 157 lbs
Win	10–4	Luke Becker	6–2	March 16–18, 2000	2000 NCAA Division I Championships
Loss	9–4	T.J. Williams	5–7	March 16–18, 2000	2000 NCAA Division I Championships
Win	9–3	Shaun Shapert	7–2	March 16–18, 2000	2000 NCAA Division I Championships
Win	8–3	Cole Sanderson	10–3	March 16–18, 2000	2000 NCAA Division I Championships
Win	7–3	Warren McPherson	3–2	March 16–18, 2000	2000 NCAA Division I Championships
Win	6–3	Ed Hockenberry	10–6	March 16–18, 2000	2000 NCAA Division I Championships
Win	5–3	Ray Stofko	10–3	March 16–18, 2000	2000 NCAA Division I Championships
Loss	4–3	Shaun Shapert	4–5	March 16–18, 2000	2000 NCAA Division I Championships
1999 NCAA Championships 4th at 157 lbs
Loss	4–2	Larry Quisel	2–8	March 18–20, 1999	1999 NCAA Division I Championships
Win	4–1	Chris Ayres	4–3	March 18–20, 1999	1999 NCAA Division I Championships
Loss	3–1	Casey Cunningham	0–1	March 18–20, 1999	1999 NCAA Division I Championships
Win	3–0	Mike Ziska	6–5	March 18–20, 1999	1999 NCAA Division I Championships
Win	2–0	Ben Boozer	OT 4–2	March 18–20, 1999	1999 NCAA Division I Championships
Win	1–0	Eric Jorgensen	6–2	March 18–20, 1999	1999 NCAA Division I Championships

== Personal life ==
Snyder graduated from the University of Nebraska–Lincoln with a bachelor’s degree in sociology and communication studies in 2002. In 2005, he earned his Master of Arts in sociology. He then enrolled in the University of Colorado Denver where he earned his Doctor of Philosophy in sociology in 2012.
