= Roller derby in the United States =

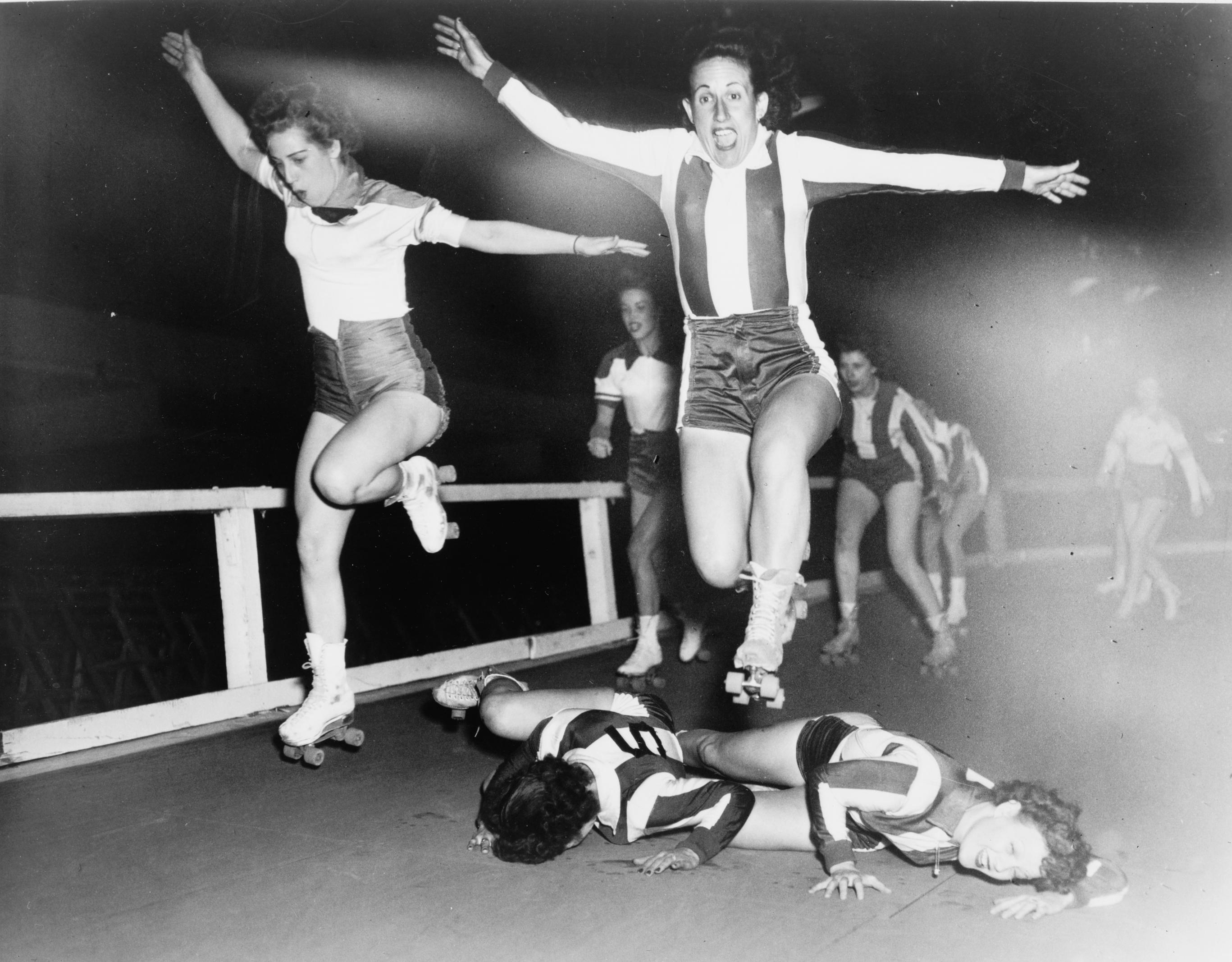
Two women's league roller derby skaters leap over two who have fallen in a 1950 bout in New York City.

The growing popularity of roller skating in the United States led to the formation of organized multi-day endurance races for cash prizes as early as the mid-1880s. Speed and endurance races continued to be held on both flat and banked tracks in the century's first three decades and spectators enjoyed the spills and falls of the skaters. The term "roller derby" was used to refer to such races by 1922.

== Associations ==
There are a multitude of roller derby associations in the United States.

- Men's Roller Derby Association (MRDA) – 68 member leagues as of September 2019
- Modern Athletic Derby Endeavor (MADE) – 8 member leagues
- Junior Roller Derby Association (JRDA) – 118 junior roller derby member leagues as of Dec 2017
- Roller Derby Coalition of Leagues (RDCL) – 8 banked track member leagues as of September 2019
- USA Roller Sports (USARS) – 57 member leagues (combines all age and gender divisions)
- Women's Flat Track Derby Association (WFTDA) – 460 member leagues as of September 2019

== Leagues ==
Due to historical accident, the term "league" in modern roller derby means something more akin to a football club than to a traditional sports league thus, there are a very large number of leagues sometimes even including two or more based in a single city.

Western USA
City, State	Team	Dates
Albuquerque, NM	Albuquerque Roller Derby	2015–present
Albuquerque, NM	Duke City Derby	2005–present
Honolulu, HI	Aloha City Rollers	2011–present
Anchorage, AK	Rage City Rollergirls	2007–present
Antioch, CA	Undead Bettys	2008–present
Auburn, WA	A-Town Derby Dollz	
Austin, TX	Texas Rollergirls	2003–present
Austin, TX	TXRD Lonestar Rollergirls	2001–present
Austin, TX	(known as Bad Girl/Good Woman Productions)	2001–2003
Bakersfield, CA	Bakersfield Diamond Divas	
Bakersfield, CA	Derby Revolution of Bakersfield	2009–present
Beaumont, TX	Spindletop Rollergirls	2009–present
Bellingham, WA	Bellingham Roller Betties	
Bend, OR	Lava City Roller Dolls	2006–present
Bend, OR	Renegade Rollergirls of Oregon	
Boise, ID	Treasure Valley Roller Girls	
Castle Rock, CO	Castle Rock'n'Rollers	
Centralia, WA	Rainy City Roller Dolls	2007–present
Chico, CA	NorCal Roller Girls	
Chino, CA	Prison City Derby Dames; Hottest Flat Track Mommas Around!!	
Coeur d'Alene, ID	North Idaho Roller Derby (N.I.R.D.'s)	2009–present
Coeur d'Alene, ID	Snake Pit Derby Dames	2010–present
Colorado Springs, CO	Pikes Peak Derby Dames	2005–present
Coos Bay, Oregon	Coos County Roller Girls	
Corpus Christi, TX	Crude City Roller Derby	
Corvallis, Oregon	Sick Town Derby Dames	
Dallas, TX	Assassination City Derby	2005–present
Dallas, TX	Dallas Derby Devils	2004–present
Deer Park, TX	Battleground Rollerderby	
Denver, CO	Denver Roller Dolls	2005–present
Denver, CO	Rocky Mountain Rollergirls	2004–present
El Paso, TX	Sun City Rollergirls	
Elko, NV	NV East Roller Girls	
Ellensburg, WA	Rodeo City Rollergirls	
Eugene, Oregon	Emerald City Roller Girls	
Eureka, CA	Humboldt Roller Derby	
Everett, WA	Jet City Roller Girls	2006–present
Everett, WA	Flat Track	2010–present
Fairbanks, Alaska	Fairbanks Rollergirls	
Flagstaff, AZ	High Altitude Roller Derby	2012–present
Fort Collins, CO	FOCO Girls Gone Derby	
Fresno, CA	NOtown Roller Derby	2008–present
Gilroy, CA	South County Derby Girls	
Greeley, CO	Slaughterhouse Derby Girls	
Honolulu, HI	Pacific Roller Derby	
Houston, TX	Houston Roller Derby	
Humboldt County, CA	Humboldt's Redwood Rollers	
Inland Empire, CA	Inland Empire Derby Divas	
Joint Base Lewis-McChord, WA	Bettie Brigade	2010–present, flat track
Juneau, AK	Juneau Roller Girls	
Kalispell, MT	Flathead Valley Roller Derby	
Kennewick, WA	Atomic City Rollergirls	
Kihei, HI	Maui Roller Girls	
Las Vegas, NV	Fabulous Sin City Rollergirls	2005–present
Las Vegas, NV	(known as Sin City Rollergirls)	2005–2007
Lawton, OK	580 Rollergirls; Flat track	2010–present
Lawton, OK	Darkside Derby	2011–present
Lawton, OK	Welcome to the Darkside	July 2011
Los Angeles	Angel City Derby Girls	
Los Angeles	L.A. Derby Dolls	
Lancaster, CA	Wasteland Roller Derby	
Lubbock, TX	West Texas Roller Dollz	
Lynnwood, WA	Angel Makers of Everett	
Medford, OR	Southern Oregon Rollergirls	
Mesa, AZ	Arizona Rollergirls	2009–present
Modesto, CA	SINtral Valley Derby Girls	2008–present
Moscow, ID	Rolling Hills Derby Dames	
Oak Harbor, WA	Whidbey Island Roller Girls	2010–present
Ogden, UT	Junction City Roller Dolls	2009–present
Ogden, UT	O-Town Derby Dames	2008–present
Oklahoma City, OK	Oklahoma City Roller Derby's Tornado Alley Rollergirls	
Oklahoma City, OK	Oklahoma Victory Dolls	
Oklahoma City, OK	Red Dirt Rebellion Rollergirls	
Olympia, WA	Oly Rollers	
Orange County, CA	The Renegade Rollergirls of Orange County	2007–present
Orange County, CA	Orange County Roller Girls	
Pearland, TX	South Side Roller Derby	
Phoenix, AZ	Arizona Derby Dames	2005–present
Phoenix, AZ	Arizona Roller Derby	2003–present
Phoenix, AZ	Desert Dolls Roller Derby League	2009–present
Phoenix, AZ	Hell City Rollergirls	
Phoenix, AZ	Renegade Rollergirls	2004–present
Port Angeles, WA	Port Scandalous Roller Derby	
Port Orchard, WA	Slaughter County Roller Vixens	2007–present
Portland, Oregon	Rose City Rollers	
Poteau, OK	Mountain Gateway Sister Hood of Steel	
Pueblo, CO	Pueblo Derby Devil Dollz	
Pullman, WA	Rolling Hills Derby Dames	
Reno, NV	Battle Born Derby Demons	2006–present
Reno, NV	Reno Roller Girls	
Riverside, CA	Inland Empire Derby Divas	2006–present
Sacramento, CA	Sac City Rollers	2006–present
Sacramento, CA	Sacred City Derby Girls	2006–present
Salt Lake City, UT	Salt City Derby Girls	2005–present
Salt Lake City, UT	Wasatch Roller Derby	2009–present
San Antonio, TX	Alamo City Rollergirls	
San Clemente, CA	South Coast Roller Derby	
San Diego	San Diego Derby Dolls	
San Diego	San Diego Roller Derby	
San Diego	Renegade Rollergirls	
San Francisco	B.ay A.rea D.erby Girls	
San Jose, CA	Silicon Valley Roller Girls	
San Luis Obispo, CA	Central Coast Roller Derby	
San Marcos, TX	Hill Country Derby Dames	2010–present
Santa Barbara, CA	Mission City Brawlin' Betties	
Santa Cruz, CA	Santa Cruz Derby Girls	
Santa Maria, CA	Rocketeer Rollers	
Rohnert Park, CA	Resurrection Roller Derby	2011–present
Seattle, WA	Rat City Rollergirls	2004–present
Seattle, WA	Seattle Shanghai	
Seattle, WA	Tilted Thunder Rail Birds	
Sonoma, CA	Sonoma County Roller Derby; Wine Country Homewreckers/North Bay Bruisers	2007–present
Sonora, CA	Mountain Derby Girls	
Spokane, WA	Lilac City Rollergirls	
Spokane Valley, WA	Spokannibals	
Stillwater, OK	Central Oklahoma Roller Derby Association	
Stockton, CA	Port City Roller Girls	
Tacoma, WA	Dockyard Derby Dames	
Tacoma, WA	Toxic–253	
Tacoma, WA	Dome City Retro Rogues	
Tri-Cities, WA	Atomic City Rollergirls	
Tucson, AZ	Tucson Roller Derby	2003–present
Tulsa, OK (Tulsa Metro Area)	Green Country Roller Girls	
Tyler, TX	East Texas Bombers	
Ventura, CA	Ventura County Derby Darlins	2007–present
Ventura, CA	West Coast Derby Knockouts	
Victorville, CA	Dirt City Roller Rats	
Wasilla, AK	Denali Destroyer Dolls	2010–present
Wenatchee, WA	Apple City Roller Derby	

Midwestern USA
City, State	Team	Dates
Akron, OH	The Rubber City Rollergirls	2008–present
Akron	NEO Rock'n'Rollergirls	2007–present
Ann Arbor, MI	Ann Arbor Derby Dimes	2010–present
Appleton, WI	The Fox Cityz Foxz	2007–present
Appleton, WI	Paper Valley Roller Girls	2008–present
Athens, OH	Athens Ohio Roller Derby	2012–present
Aurora, IL	Aurora 88's Roller Derby	
Beloit, WI	Stateline Roller Derby Divas	2007–June 2012
Beloit, WI	Beloit Bombshells	June 2012 – present
Bemidji, MN	The Babe City Rollers	2009–present
Bloomington, IN	Boomington Blockheads Roller Derby	2021–present
Bloomington-Normal, IL	McLean County MissFits	2010–present
Bowling Green, KY	Vette City Roller Derby	
Burlington, WI	Chocolate City Cherry Bombers	
Cape Girardeau, MO	Cape Girardeau Roller Girls	2010–present
Cedar Rapids, IA	Cedar Rapids Rollergirls	2008–present
Champaign, IL	Champaign Urbana Rollers	2009–2010
Champaign, IL	Twin City Derby Girls	2010–present
Chicago, IL	Windy City Rollers	2004–present
Chicago, IL	Chicago Outfit Roller Derby	2007–present
Cincinnati, OH	Cincinnati Rollergirls	2006–present
Cleveland, OH	Burning River Roller Girls	
Columbia, MO	COMO Derby Dames	2007–present
Columbus, OH	Ohio Roller Girls	
Covington, KY	Black-n-Bluegrass Rollergirls	
Davenport, IA	Quad City Rollers	
Dayton, OH	Gem City Roller Derby	
Decatur, IL	Prairieland Punishers	2011–present
Delavan, WI	Delavan Dolls of Derby	2010–present
Des Moines, IA	Des Moines Derby Dames	
Des Moines, IA	Mid-Iowa Rollers	
Detroit, MI	Detroit Derby Girls	
Duluth, MN	Harbor City Roller Dames	
Evansville, IN	Demolition City Roller Derby	
Evansville, IN	Rollergirls of Southern Indiana	
Fargo, ND	Fargo Moorhead Derby Girls	
Flint, MI	Flint City Derby Girls	
Fort Wayne, IN	Fort Wayne Derby Girls	
Grand Rapids, MI	Grand Raggidy Roller Girls	
Indianapolis, IN	Naptown Roller Derby	
Indianapolis, IN	Circle City Roller Derby	
Iowa City, IA	Old Capitol City Roller Girls	
Kalamazoo, MI	Killamazoo Derby Darlins	
Kansas City, MO	Kansas City Roller Warriors	
Kokomo, IN	City of Fists Roller Girls	
La Crosse, WI	La Crosse Skating Sirens	
La Crosse, WI	Mississippi Valley Mayhem	
Lafayette, IN	Lafayette Brawlin Dolls	
Lansing, MI	Mitten Mavens	
Lansing, MI	Lansing Derby Vixens	
Lexington, KY	Rollergirls Of Central Kentucky	
Liberty, MO	Dead Girl Derby KC	
Lincoln, NE	No Coast Derby Girls	
Louisville, KY	Derby City Rollergirls	
Madison, WI	Mad Rollin' Dolls	
Marietta, OH	Hades Ladies	
Marion, IL	Southern Illinois Roller Girls	2009–present
Milwaukee, WI	Brewcity Bruisers	
Minneapolis-St. Paul, MN	Minnesota RollerGirls	
Minneapolis-St. Paul, MN	North Star Roller Girls	
Mount Morris, MI	Mid Michigan Derby Girls	
Mount Vernon, OH	Central Ohio Roller Derby	
Muncie, IN	Cornfed Derby Dames	
Newport, KY	Riverside Rollergirls	
Omaha, NE	Omaha Rollergirls	
Oskaloosa, IA	Mahaska Mayhem	2009–present
Paducah, KY	West Kentucky Rockin' Rollers	2010–present
Paducah, KY	Radioactive City Rollergirls	
Peoria, IL	Peoria Push	2010–present
Richmond, IN	The Dire Skates (Wayne County Women's Roller Derby LLC)	2010–present
Rock Island, IL	Farm Fresh Roller Girls	
Rockford, IL	Rockford Rage Roller Derby	
Roselle, IL	DuPage Derby Dames	2010–present
Sand Springs, OK	Tulsa Derby Brigade	
Sandusky, OH	Sandusky Rollergirls	
Sioux City, IA	Sioux City Roller Dames	
Sioux Falls, SD	Sioux Falls Roller Dollz	
South Bend, IN	South Bend Roller Girls	
Springfield, MO	Springfield Roller Girls,	2005–present
Springfield, MO	Ozarks Derby Bridade (Men's team),	2010–present
St. Louis, MO	Arch Rival Rollergirls	2005–present
St. Clairsville, OH	Ohio Valley Roller Girls	
Toledo, OH	Glass City Rollers	
Traverse City, MI	Traverse City Roller Derby	
Wausau, WI	The River Valley Rollergirls	
Wichita, KS	Wichita/ICT Roller Girls	2006–present

Northeastern USA
City, State	Team	Dates
Albany, NY	Albany All Stars Roller Derby	
Allentown, PA	Lehigh Valley Rollergirls	
Baltimore, MD	Charm City Roller Girls	2005–present
Barre, VT	Central Vermont Roller Derby	2010–present
Boston, MA	Boston Derby Dames	
Buffalo, NY	Queen City Roller Girls	
Burlington, VT	Green Mountain Derby Dames	2007–present
Charlottesville, VA	Charlottesville Derby Dames	
Concord, NH	Granite State Roller Derby	
Cattaraugus County, NY	Rockin' Rural Roller Girls	
Downingtown, PA	Brandywine Roller Derby	
Frederick, MD	Key City Roller Derby	
Hagerstown, MD	Mason-Dixon Roller Vixens	
Harrisburg, PA	Harrisburg Area Roller Derby	
Ithaca, NY	Ithaca League of Women Rollers	
Keene, NH	ElmCityDerbyDamez	
Kingston, NY	Hudson Valley Horrors	
Lancaster, PA	Dutchland Derby Rollers	
Long Island, NY	Long Island Roller Rebels	
Long Island, NY	Strong Island Derby Revolution	
Manchester, NH	ManchVegasRollerGirls	
Morristown, NJ	Jerzey Derby Brigade	
Nashua, NH	New Hampshire Roller Derby	
New Brunswick, NJ	New Jersey Hellrazors Roller Derby	
New York City	Gotham Girls Roller Derby	
Newark, NJ	Garden State Roller Girls	
Northampton, MA	Pioneer Valley Roller Derby	
Oswego, NY	The Oz Roller Girls	
Philadelphia, PA	Penn Jersey Roller Derby	
Philadelphia, PA	Philly Rollergirls	
Pittsburgh, PA	Steel City Derby Demons	
Portland, ME	Maine Roller Derby	
Providence, RI	Providence Roller Derby	
Red Bank, NJ	Red Bank Roller Vixens	
Rochester, NY	Roc City Roller Derby	2008–present
Rockville, MD	Free State Roller Derby	2009–present
Shore Points, NJ	Shore Points Roller Derby	
South Jersey	South Jersey Derby Girls	
State College, PA	State College Area Rollers (SCAR)	2010–present
Syracuse, NY	Assault City Roller Derby	
Taunton, MA	Mass Attack Roller Derby	
Toms River, NJ	Jersey Shore Roller Girls	
Troy, NY	Hellions of Troy	
Utica, NY	Central New York Roller Derby	
Washington, D.C.	DC Rollergirls	
Waterbury, CT	CT RollerGirls	
Watertown, NY	Black River Rollers	
Westchester County, NY	Suburbia Roller Derby	
Westminster, MD	Chesapeake Roller Derby MADE	
Scranton, PA	Wilkes-Barre/Scranton Roller Derby	2006–present
Scranton, PA	Old Coal City and Diamond City	2006
Wilmington, DE	Wilmington City Ruff Rollers	
Yonkers, NY	Suburbia Roller Derby	

Southern USA
City, State	Team	Dates
Alexandria, LA	Cenla Derby Dames	
Asheville, NC	Blue Ridge Rollergirls	
Atlanta, GA	Atlanta Rollergirls	
Athens, GA	Classic City Rollergirls	
Auburn, AL	Burn City Rollers	
Augusta, GA	Soul City Sirens Roller Derby	
Baton Rouge, LA	Red Stick Roller Derby	
Biloxi, MS	Mississippi Rollergirls	
Birmingham, AL	Tragic City Rollers	
Boone, NC	Appalachian Rollergirls	
Bossier City, LA	Twin City Knockers	
Bradenton, FL	Bradentucky Bombers	
South East Florida, FL	Gold Coast Derby Grrls (formerly Broward County Derby Grrls)	
Charleston, SC	Lowcountry High Rollers	
Charleston, WV	Chemical Valley Rollergirls	
Charleston, WV	Heart of Appalachia Roller Derby	
Charlotte, NC	Charlotte Roller Girls (CLTRG)	
Charlotte, NC	Charlotte Speed Demons(CSD)	
Charlottesville, VA	Charlottesville Derby Dames (CDD)	
Chattanooga, TN	Chattanooga Rollergirls (CRG)	
Columbia, SC	Columbia QuadSquad	
Columbia, SC	Richland County Regulators (RCR)	
Columbus, MS	Mississippi Brawl Stars	
Crestview, FL	Okaloosa Rollers	
Easley, SC	Angels of Anarchy Rollergirls (AAR)	
Fayetteville, AR	NWA Rollergirls	2006–present
Fayetteville, NC	ROGUE Rollergirls	
Fort Pierce, FL	South Florida Rollergirls	
Fort Smith, AR	River Valley Rollergirls	
Fort Myers, FL	Ft. Myers Derby Girls	
Fort Walton Beach, FL & Destin, FL	Beach Brawl SK8R Dolls	
Gainesville, FL /Lake City, Florida	Alachua County Rollers	2010
Gainesville, FL /Lake City, Florida	Gainesville Roller Rebels	
Greensboro, NC	Greensboro Roller Derby (GSORD)	
Greenville, NC	Coastal Plains Derby Dames	
Greenville, NC	Ring City Rollergirls (RCR)	
Greenville, SC	Greenville Derby Dames (GDD)	
Greenville, SC	Upstate Roller Girl Evolution (URGE)	
Hattiesburg, MS	Southern Misfits	
Harrisonburg, VA	RockTown Rollers	
Huntsville, AL	Dixie Derby Girls	2004–present
Huntsville, AL	Rolling Arsenal of Derby	
Jackson, MS	Capital City Roller Girls	
Jackson, MS	Magnolia Roller Vixens	
Jacksonville, FL	Jacksonville RollerGirls	
Knoxville, TN	Hard Knox Roller Girls	
Lafayette, LA	Acadiana Good Times Rollers	
Lake Charles, LA	Flat Out Roller Derby	2011
Lake Charles, LA	Gulf Coast Rollergirls	2011
Little Rock, AR	Central Arkansas Roller Derby	
Memphis, TN	Memphis Roller Derby	
Macon, GA	Middle Georgia Derby Demons	
Miami, FL	Vice City Rollers	
Mobile, AL	Mobile Roller Derby	
Montgomery, AL	Montgomery Roller Derby	2014-Present
Montgomery, AL	River Region Rollergirls	2011-2014
Morgantown, WV	Morgantown Roller Vixens	
Myrtle Beach, SC	Grand Strand Roller Girls	
Myrtle Beach, SC	Palmetto State Roller Girls	
New Orleans, LA	Big Easy Rollergirls	
Orange Park, FL	Tri-County Rolling Militia	
Orlando area, FL	Florida Derby League	
Orlando, FL	Tourist City Terrors	
Panama City, FL	Panama City Roller Derby	
Palm Beach County, FL	Palm Beach Rollergirls	
Pensacola, FL	Pensacola Roller Gurlz	
Raleigh, NC	Carolina Rollergirls	
Richmond, VA	Richmond Derby Demons	
Richmond, VA	Mother State Roller Derby	
Richmond, VA	River City Rollergirls	
Roanoke, VA	Star City Roller Girls	
Rockledge, FL	Molly Roger Rollergirls	
St. Petersburg, FL	Sunshine City Roller Derby	2020–present
Savannah, GA	Savannah Derby Devils	
South East Florida, FL	Gold Coast Derby Grrls (formerly Broward County Derby Grrls)	
Tallahassee, FL	Tallahassee Rollergirls	
Tampa, FL	Tampa Bay Derby Darlins	
Virginia Beach, VA	Dominion Derby Girls	
Wilmington, NC	Cape Fear Roller Girls	
Houston County, GA	War Town Derby Dames	

== See also ==
- Roller derby
- List of roller derby associations
- List of roller derby leagues
- History of roller derby
