= Hockey player statue (Newark) =

Sculpture

Coordinates: 40°44′05″N 74°10′11″W

- Artist: Jon Krawczyk
- Year: 2008; Official opening September 29, 2009
- Type: Stainless steel
- Dimensions: 22 ft (6.7 m) (height)
- Location: Prudential Center Newark, New Jersey

The hockey player statue is a sculpture located at Championship Plaza, adjacent to the Prudential Center in Newark, New Jersey, home of the New Jersey Devils hockey team, installed in 2009. Entitled Stanley by the artist it has been colloquially known as Iceman, Man of Steel, and the Iron Man.

The stainless steel work of an anonymous hockey player taking a slapshot is 22 feet (6.7 m) tall and weighs 7,000 pounds (3,200 kg). It was created by Jon Krawczyk, a native of Boonton Township, New Jersey, and a lifelong Devils fan. It was fabricated in his Malibu, California, studio and shipped cross country in three sections. A Prudential Center Opening Night hat and puck and a Scott Stevens jersey are encapsulated inside.

Krawczyk originally proposed the sculpture to Michael Gilfillan, a friend from Delbarton School and part owner of the Devils. It has since become a meeting point for fans. Of the work, Krawczyk said that it was made in a way to appear like blocks of ice molded together. “Especially with the stainless steel-look with the grind marks, it gives it the look that ice has when it breaks, and you get an almost diamond quality. I wanted to do something where you had that movement, and with lights nearby, the statue changes as you move around it. I wanted to have as much motion in it as possible, with it still being a solid sculpture.”

It has been said of the giant statue: "Rather than risking its statue being exposed to bullets, baseball bats, or flaming arrows, as other have across the country, Newark made its 22 feet (6.7 m) hockey player completely out of hardened steel. This is the enforcer who makes sure no one pushes around the New Jersey Devils..."

Krawczyk was later commissioned to create another statue at Prudential Center, The Salute, an homage to Martin Brodeur dedicated in 2016.

== See also ==
- List of public art in Newark, New Jersey
- Sports in Newark, New Jersey
