= Garden State Roller Derby =

Roller derby league

- Metro area: Newark, New Jersey
- Country: United States
- Founded: 2006
- Teams: Ironbound Maidens (A team); Brick City Bruisers (B team); Gateway Grim Reapers; Northern Nightmares; Hub City Hellrazors (inactive); Jersey City Bridge & Pummel (inactive)
- Track type: Flat
- Venue: Inline Skating Club of America Roller Skating Rink; North Arlington, New Jersey
- Affiliations: WFTDA
- Website: www.gardenstaterollerderby.org

Garden State Roller Derby (GSR) is a flat-track roller derby league based in Newark, New Jersey and competes at the Inline Skating Club of America in North Arlington, New Jersey. Founded in 2006, it has three home teams, the Gateway Grim Reapers, the Jersey City Bridge and Pummel, the Northern Nighmares and two travel teams, the all-star Ironbound Maidens and the B-team, the Brick City Bruisers, which compete against teams from other leagues. Garden State Roller Derby is a member of the Women's Flat Track Derby Association (WFTDA).

== History ==
The NJ Dirty Dames were founded in March 2006 as the first roller derby league in New Jersey and was based in Kendall Park. It merged with the Garden State Rollergirls June 1st 2008 with its All Star team, the Hub City Hellrazors, initially becoming an additional intraleague team.

In 2009, the league was featured in an item on CBS News. The league was accepted into the Women's Flat Track Derby Association Apprentice Program in September 2009, and became full members of the WFTDA in June 2010. By 2010, it had around 40 skaters.

In 2020, Garden State Rollergirls rebranded as Garden State Roller Derby to promote inclusivity.

== WFTDA rankings ==
Season	Final ranking	Playoffs	Championship
2011	27 E	DNQ	DNQ
2012	27 E	DNQ	DNQ
2013	88 WFTDA	DNQ	DNQ
2014	92 WFTDA	DNQ	DNQ
2015	97 WFTDA	DNQ	DNQ
2016	96 WFTDA	DNQ	DNQ
2017	70 WFTDA	DNQ	DNQ
2018	75 WFTDA	DNQ	DNQ
2019	113 WFTDA	DNQ	DNQ
2023	119 NA Northeast	DNQ	DNQ
2024	113 NA Northeast	DNQ	DNQ

== See also ==
- Roller derby in the United States
- Sports in Newark, New Jersey
