= Eastern Pennsylvania Athletic Conference =

Junior college athletic conference

- Association: NJCAA
- Founded: 2012
- Sports fielded: 21 (11 men's, 10 women's)
- No. of teams: 13
- Region: Eastern Pennsylvania – NJCAA Region 19

The Eastern Pennsylvania Athletic Conference (EPAC) is a junior college conference in the National Junior College Athletic Association (NJCAA) for many technical and community colleges in eastern Pennsylvania. And it is one of two conferences within the Region 19 of the NJCAA. Conference championships are held in most sports and individuals can be named to All-Conference and All-Academic teams.

== Member schools ==
=== Current members ===
The EPAC currently has 13 full members, all but four are public schools:

Institution	Location	Founded	Affiliation	Enrollment	Nickname	Joined
Community College of Philadelphia	Philadelphia, Pennsylvania	1965	Public	13,672	Lions	2013
Delaware County Community College	Marple, Pennsylvania	1967	Public	10,073	Phantoms	2012
Delaware Technical & Community College at Charles L. Terry (Note: This campus sponsors men's lacrosse.)	Dover, Delaware	1972	Public	14,029	Diamonds	2020
Delaware Technical & Community College at Jack F. Owens (Note: This campus sponsors baseball and softball, as well as men's & women's cross country.)	Georgetown, Delaware	1966	Public	14,029	Diamonds	2020
Delaware Technical & Community College at Stanton-Wilmington (Note: This campus sponsors men's & women's basketball and women's volleyball.)	Stanton, Delaware	1973	Public	14,029	Diamonds	2020
Harcum College	Bryn Mawr, Pennsylvania	1915	Nonsectarian	1,600	Bears	2012
Harrisburg Area Community College	Harrisburg, Pennsylvania	1964	Public	19,000	Hawks	2012
Lackawanna College	Scranton, Pennsylvania	1894	Nonsectarian	2,043	Falcons	2012
Lehigh Carbon Community College	Schnecksville, Pennsylvania	1966	Public	7,184	Cougars	2012
Luzerne County Community College	Nanticoke, Pennsylvania	1967	Public	4,920	Trailblazers	2012
Montgomery County Community College	Blue Bell, Pennsylvania	1967	Public	10,073	Mustangs	2012
Northampton Community College	Bethlehem, Pennsylvania	1967	Public	8,951	Spartans	2012
Thaddeus Stevens College of Technology (Thaddeus Stevens Tech)	Lancaster, Pennsylvania	1905	Public	1,200	Bulldogs	2012
Williamson College of the Trades (Williamson Trade)	Middletown Township, Pennsylvania	1967	Nonsectarian	250	Mechanics	2012

=== Former members ===
The EPAC had three former full members, all but one were public schools:

Institution	Location	Founded	Affiliation	Enrollment	Nickname	Joined	Left	Current conference
Bucks County Community College	Newtown, Pennsylvania	1964	Public	9,649	Centurions	2012	2021	Eastern States (ESAC) (Note: Currently an USCAA athletic conference.)
Johnson College	Scranton, Pennsylvania	1912	Nonsectarian	523	Jaguars	2013	2018	N/A (Note: Discontinued its intercollegiate athletics program.)
Manor College	Jenkintown, Pennsylvania	1947	Catholic (S.S.B.G.)	1,000	Blue Jays	2012	2022	Eastern States (ESAC)
Valley Forge Military College	Wayne, Pennsylvania	1928	Independent	175	Trojans	2013	2020	N/A

== See also ==
- National Junior College Athletic Association (NJCAA)
- Garden State Athletic Conference
