= Sports in New Jersey =

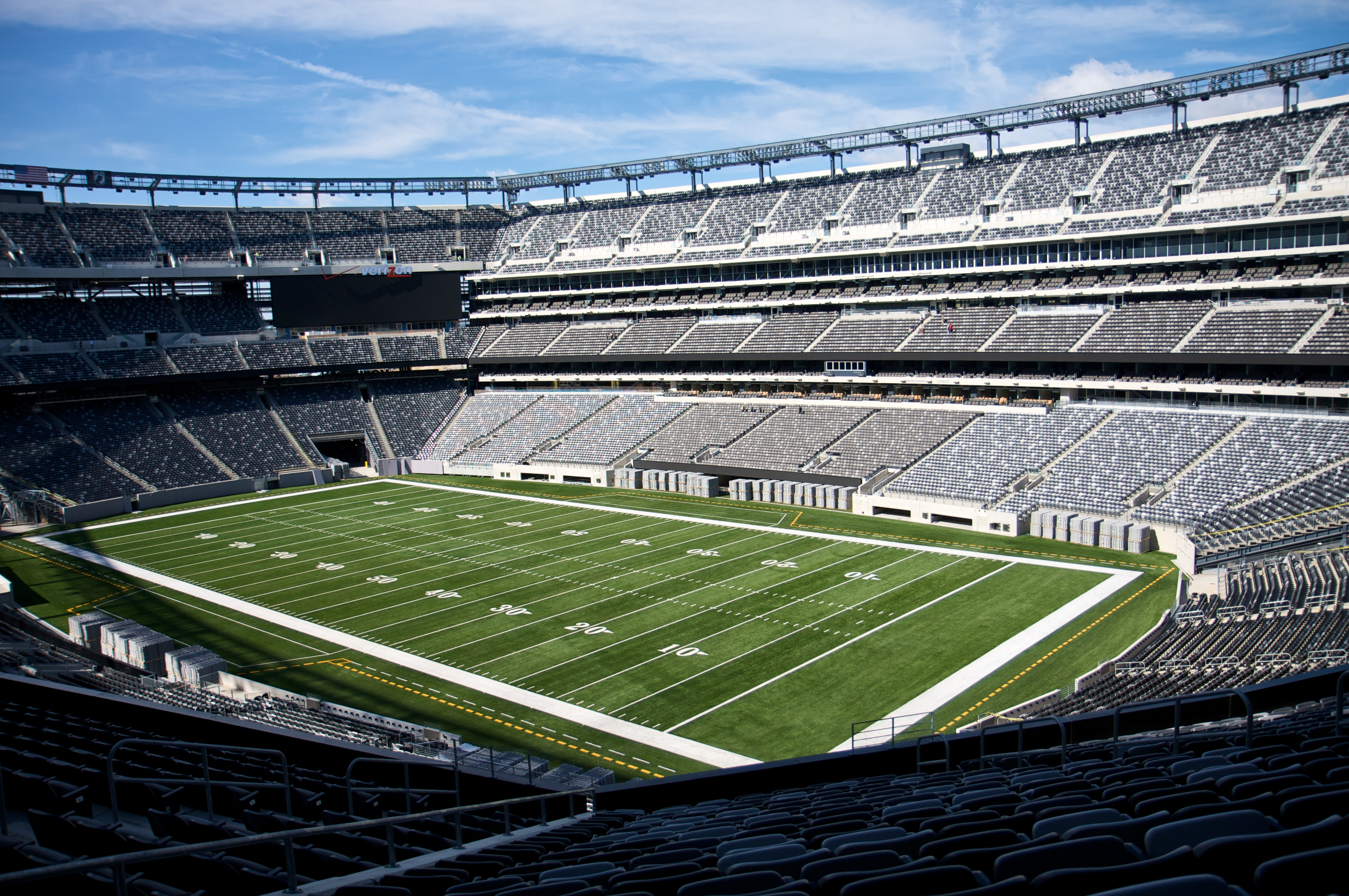
MetLife Stadium in East Rutherford, Bergen County, home to the NFL's New York Giants and New York Jets.

As of 2024, New Jersey has six teams from major professional sports leagues playing in the state, with only one team identifying themselves as solely being from the state. The other remaining teams identify themselves as being from the New York metropolitan area with the National Women's Soccer League team having a team name that represents both New Jersey and New York. The National Hockey League and National Basketball Association teams representing Philadelphia have their training facilities in South Jersey.

== Major League professional sports ==
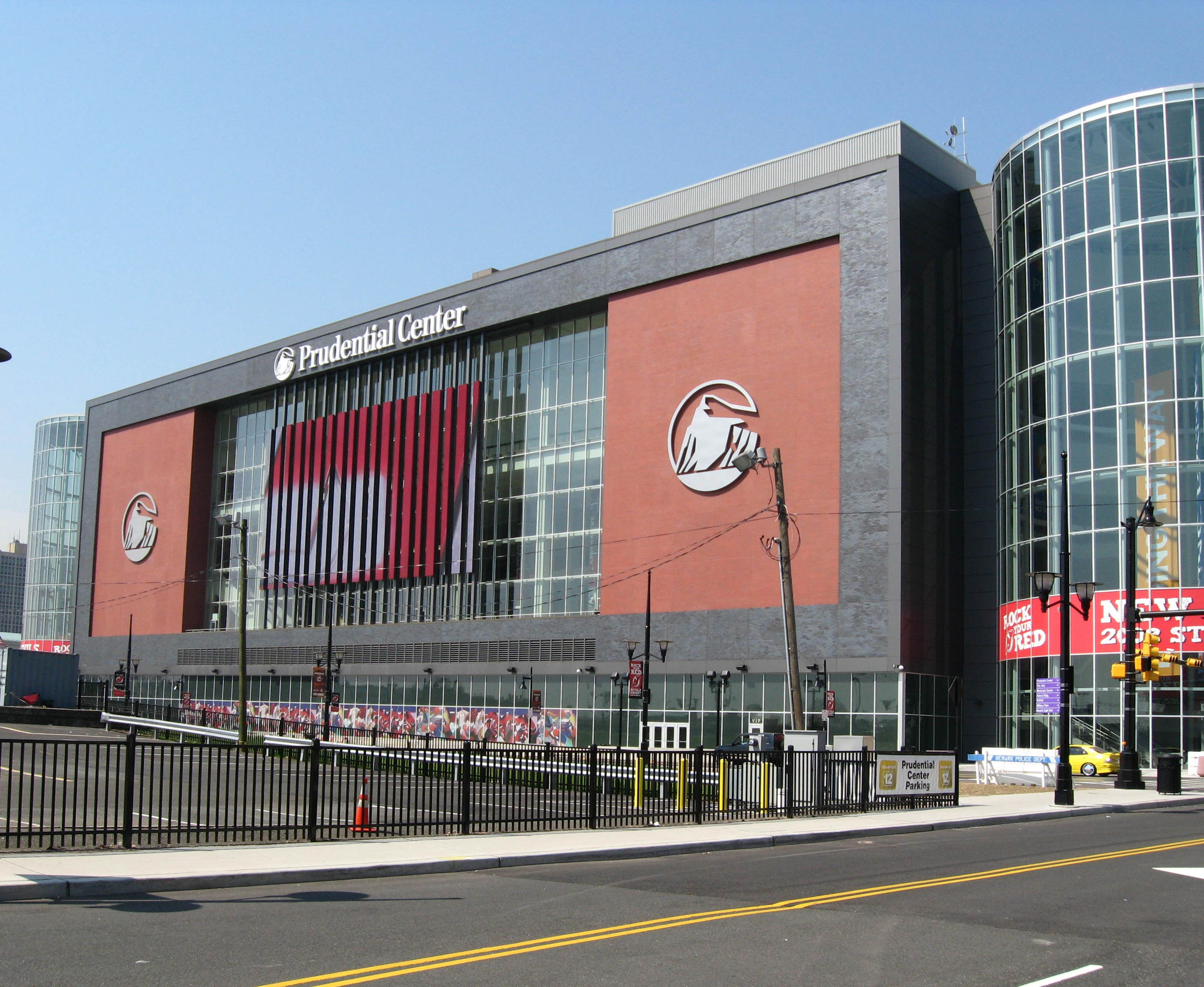
The Prudential Center in Newark home of the NHL's New Jersey Devils and PWHL's New York Sirens.

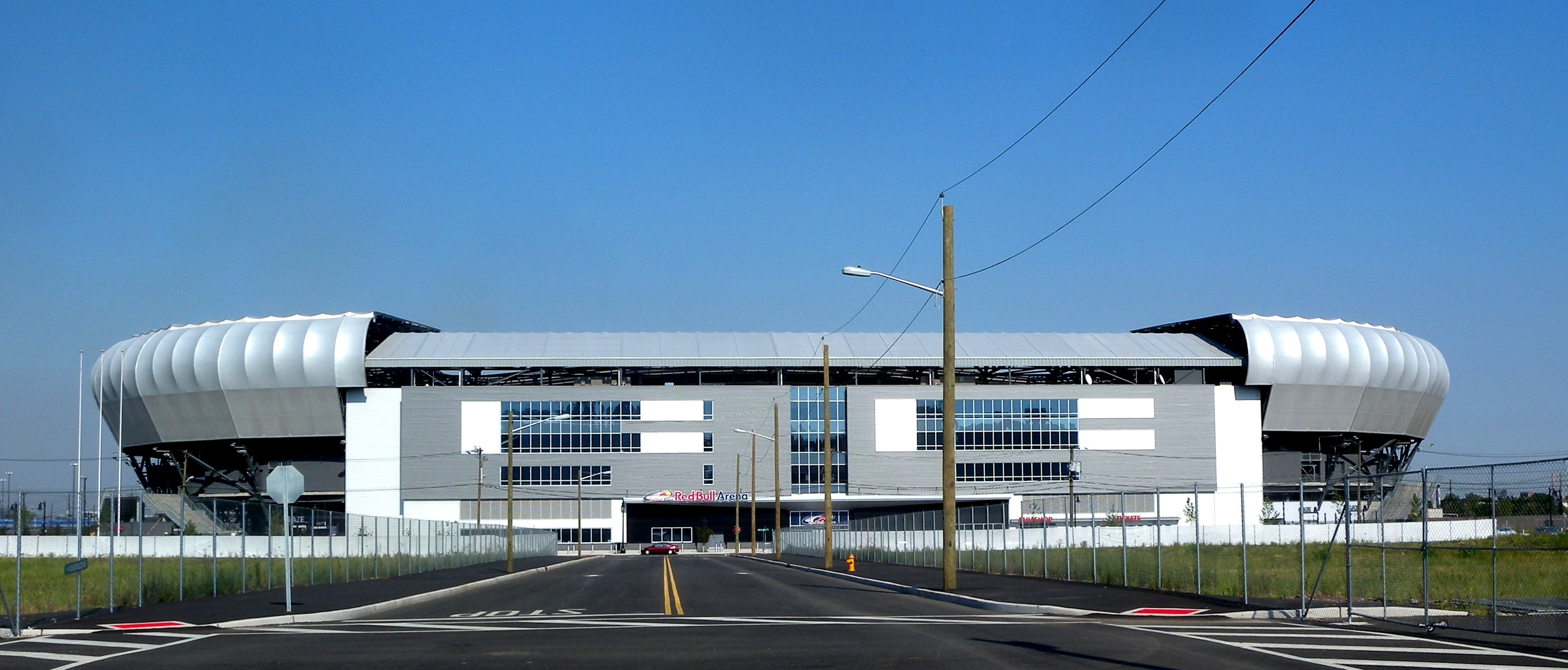
Sports Illustrated Stadium in Harrison, home of the MLS's New York Red Bulls and NWSL's Gotham FC.

The National Hockey League's New Jersey Devils, based in Newark at the Prudential Center, is the only major league franchise to solely bear the state's name. Founded in 1974 in Kansas City, Missouri as the Kansas City Scouts, the team played in Denver, Colorado as the Colorado Rockies from 1976 until the spring of 1982 when naval architect, businessman, and Jersey City native John J. McMullen purchased and relocated the franchise to Brendan Byrne Arena in East Rutherford's Meadowlands Sports Complex under its current identity. While the organization was largely a failure on the ice in Kansas City, Denver, and its first years in New Jersey, the Devils would ultimately begin their rise to prominence in the late 1980s and early 1990s under the tenure of Hall of Fame president and general manager Lou Lamoriello, winning the Stanley Cup in 1995, 2000, and 2003, and act as an annual fixture in the Stanley Cup playoffs for the majority of two decades. The organization is the youngest out of all nine "Big Four" major league teams within the New York Metropolitan Area and media market dominated in terms of ice hockey by the New York Rangers and Islanders prior to the Devils' arrival, but has ultimately been successful in establishing a visible and dedicated following throughout the northern and central portions of the state. In 2018, one of the Devils' fiercest rivals, the Philadelphia Flyers, renovated and expanded their training facility, the Flyers Training Center, in Voorhees Township in the southern portion of the state.

The former Metropolitan Riveters of the Premier Hockey Federation played at The Rink at the American Dream Meadowlands in the Meadowlands Sports Complex in East Rutherford. While initially beginning in Brooklyn as the New York Riveters, they moved to New Jersey in their 2016 season playing out of the Barnabas Health Hockey House at the Prudential Center. In 2016 the team formed an affiliation with the New Jersey Devils where the team renamed to the Metropolitan Riveters along with changing their uniform and team colors to match the Devils. The Riveters won both the regular season title and the Isobel Cup in the 2017–18 season. In 2019, this affiliation was terminated between the Devils and the Riveters, which caused the team to revert to their original colors along with finding a new home at the ProSkate Ice Arena in Monmouth Junction. The Premier Hockey Federation ceased operations on June 29, 2023, along with the Riveters.

On September 13, 2024, the New York Sirens of the Professional Women's Hockey League (PWHL) announced they would move to the Prudential Center and play 13 of 15 home games of the 2024 season at their new home rink. The club also announced they would move their practice facility to the Richard J. Codey Arena in West Orange, the former Devil's practice facility from 1986 to 2007.

The New York Metropolitan Area's two National Football League teams, the New York Giants and the New York Jets, both play at MetLife Stadium in East Rutherford's Meadowlands Sports Complex. At completion, with a construction cost of approximately $1.6 billion, the venue is the most expensive stadium ever built. On February 2, 2014, MetLife Stadium was the host venue for Super Bowl XLVIII. There have been multiple short lived attempts at starting a competing league to the NFL, with teams based in New Jersey. The New Jersey Generals played with the United States Football League at Giants Stadium for three seasons from 1982 until 1985 when the league went bankrupt after an antitrust lawsuit against the NFL. Two attempts by Vince McMahon at creating a competing league, both named the XFL, have been attempted in New Jersey. The first XFL league was created as a joint venture between World Wrestling Entertainment and NBC in 2001, had the New York/New Jersey Hitmen playing at Giants Stadium for the only season they played before the league folded. The New York/New Jersey Hitmen finished in third for the XFL Eastern Division for the season they played. In 2020, the New York Guardians of the newly revived XFL began played only two games at MetLife Stadium. After the XFL filed for Chapter 11 bankruptcy on April 13, 2020, citing the premature suspension of their season due to the COVID-19 pandemic, the New York Guardians ceased operations. The Guardians brand was later transferred to Orlando.

The New York Red Bulls of Major League Soccer play in Sports Illustrated Stadium, a soccer-specific stadium located in Harrison immediately across the Passaic River from downtown Newark. The team was founded in 1994 as the Empire Soccer Club, and renamed to New York/New Jersey Metrostars in 1995 and played under this name until the acquisition of the team by Red Bull GmbH in 2006, where the team was renamed to the New York Red Bulls and dropped their association with New Jersey in the team's name. For the entire team's history, the team has always played in New Jersey, where Giants Stadium served as the team's home stadium, prior to the opening of Sports Illustrated Stadium in 2010. On July 27, 2011, Sports Illustrated Stadium hosted the 2011 MLS All-Star Game.

Gotham FC was founded in 2008 as Sky Blue FC and began playing in the 2009 Women's Professional Soccer season. After the league was folded in 2012, SkyBlue FC transferred to the National Women's Soccer League beginning in the 2013 season. In November 2019 it was announced that SkyBlue FC will move from Yurcack Field at Rutgers University to Sports Illustrated Stadium, for the 2020 NWSL season In April 2021, Sky Blue officially rebranded itself as NJ/NY Gotham FC, Along with the new name, the club introduced a new crest that features the Statue of Liberty’s crown as it was voted the most recognizable symbol of New Jersey and New York. The crest also displays three letters – an “N” and a hybrid “J/Y”, which acknowledges New Jersey as the club's birthplace while embracing the club's growing New York reach. In 2025, NJ/NY Gotham rebranded to Gotham FC. In July 2026, Gotham FC announced they would leave New Jersey in 2028 and relocated to Etihad Park in New York City.

The New York Cosmos of the North American Soccer League (NASL) played at Giants Stadium from 1977 until the league collapsed at the end of the 1984 season. They won the league championship, the NASL Soccer Bowl, five times. In 2026, the Cosmos were revived in the third-division USL League One and play their home games at Hinchliffe Stadium in Paterson.

New Jersey hosted seven matches during the 1994 FIFA World Cup at Giants Stadium and hosted eight matches during the 2026 FIFA World Cup, including the final, at MetLife Stadium. Four matches of the 1999 FIFA Women's World Cup were also held at Giants Stadium. The 2016 Copa América Centenario final and three matches, including the semi-finals, of the 2024 Copa América were played at Metlife Stadium. Several CONCACAF Gold Cup tournaments have also been played at Giants Stadium, MetLife Stadium and Sports Illustrated Stadium.

From 1977 to 2012, New Jersey had a National Basketball Association (NBA) team, the New Jersey Nets, which last played at the Prudential Center in Newark. In 2012, the team was moved to Brooklyn and now plays under the Brooklyn Nets. The Net's former headquarters and training facility in East Rutherford has been renovated into the Meadowlands YMCA. The WNBA's New York Liberty played at the Prudential Center from 2011 to 2013 while Madison Square Garden was renovated. In 2016, the Philadelphia 76ers of the NBA opened their new headquarters and training facility, the Philadelphia 76ers Training Complex, in Camden.

=== Major league sports ===
==== Current New Jersey teams ====
Club	Sport	League	Stadium (capacity)	Established	Titles
New Jersey Devils	Ice hockey	NHL	Prudential Center (16,514)	1974	3 Stanley Cups
Gotham FC	Soccer	NWSL	Sports Illustrated Stadium (25,000)	2007	1 WPS Championship; 2 NWSL Championship (3 League titles)

==== Former New Jersey teams ====
Club	Sport	League	Stadium (capacity)	Established	Dissolved	Titles
Elizabeth Resolutes	Baseball	NA	Waverly Fairgrounds	1873	1873	0
Newark Peppers	Baseball	FL	Harrison Park (21,000)	1915	1915	0
Newark Stars	Baseball	ECL	Davids' Stadium (12,000)	1926	1926	0
Newark Browns	Baseball	E-WL	General Electric Field	1932	1932	0
Newark Eagles	Baseball	NNL ll	Ruppert Stadium (19,000)	1936	1948	1 Negro World Series
Orange/Newark Tornadoes	Football	NFL	Knights of Columbus Stadium (9,000); Newark Schools Stadium (25,000)	1929	1930	0
New Jersey Generals	Football	USFL	Giants Stadium (80,242)	1983	1985	0
New York/New Jersey Hitmen	Football	XFL	Giants Stadium (80,242)	1999	2001	0
New Jersey Nets	Basketball	NBA	Rutgers Athletic Center (8,000); Izod Center (20,049); Prudential Center (18,711)	1977	2012 (relocated)	0
New Jersey Pride	Field lacrosse	MLL	Yogi Berra Stadium (5,000); TD Bank Ballpark (6,100); Sprague Field (6,000); Yurcak Field (5,000)	2001	2008	0
Metropolitan Riveters	Ice Hockey	PHF	Barnabas Health Hockey House; ProSkate Ice Arena; The Rink at American Dream	2016	2023	1 Isobel Cup

==== New York metropolitan teams that play in New Jersey ====
Club	Sport	League	Stadium (capacity)	Established	Titles
New York Giants	Football	NFL	MetLife Stadium (82,500)	1925	4 NFL Championships; 4 Super Bowls (8 League titles)
New York Jets	Football	NFL	MetLife Stadium (82,500)	1959	1 Super Bowl
New York Red Bulls	Soccer	MLS	Sports Illustrated Stadium (25,000)	1994	0 MLS Cups; 3 Supporters' Shield
New York Sirens	Ice hockey	PWHL	Prudential Center (16,514)	2023	0 Walter Cups

==== Former New York metropolitan teams that played in New Jersey ====
Club	Sport	League	Stadium (capacity)	Established	Dissolved	Titles
New York Black Yankees	Baseball	NNL ll	Hinchliffe Stadium (10,000)	1931	1948	0
New York Cubans	Baseball	NNL ll	Hinchliffe Stadium (10,000)	1937	1950	1 Negro World Series
New York Cosmos	Soccer	NASL	Giants Stadium (80,242)	1970	1985	5 Soccer Bowls
New York Guardians	Football	XFL	MetLife Stadium (82,500)	2019	2022	0

== Major league professional championships ==
=== New Jersey Devils (NHL) ===
3 Stanley Cup titles

- 1995
- 2000
- 2003

=== New York Giants (de facto) (NFL) ===
4 Super Bowl Titles

- Super Bowl XXI (1986 season)
- Super Bowl XXV (1990 season)
- Super Bowl XLII (2007 season)
- Super Bowl XLVI (2011 season)

=== Gotham FC (NWSL) ===
1 WPS Championship (as Sky Blue FC)

- 2009

2 NWSL Championship

- 2023
- 2025

=== New York Red Bulls (MLS) ===
3 Supporters' Shield titles

- 2013
- 2015
- 2018

=== Metropolitan Riveters (PHF) ===
1 Isobel Cup title

- 2018

=== Newark Eagles (NNL) ===
1 Negro World Series title

- 1946

== Semi-pro and minor league sports ==
=== New Jersey teams ===
Club	Sport	League	Stadium (capacity)	Established	Titles
Somerset Patriots	Baseball	MiLB (AA-Eastern League)	TD Bank Ballpark (6,100)	1997	7
Jersey Shore BlueClaws	Baseball	MiLB (A+-South Atlantic League)	ShoreTown Ballpark (6,588)	2001	3
Trenton Thunder	Baseball	MLB Draft League	Trenton Thunder Ballpark (6,440)	1994	5
New Jersey Jackals	Baseball	Frontier League	Hinchliffe Stadium (7,800)	1998	6
Sussex County Miners	Baseball	Frontier League	Skylands Stadium (4,500)	2015	1
Garden State Warriors	Basketball	American Basketball Association	NAN Tech Newark	2005	0
New Jersey Somerset Cavaliers	Cricket	Minor League Cricket	Mercer County Park	2020	0
New Jersey Stallions	Cricket	Minor League Cricket	Mercer County Park	2020	0
Jersey Bearcats	Arena football	American Arena League	Warinanco Sports Center	2018	1
New Jersey Titans	Ice hockey	North American Hockey League	Middletown Ice World	2015	1
Garden State Roller Derby	Roller Derby	Women's Flat Track Derby Association	Inline Skating Club of America Roller Skating Rink	2006	0
Jersey Shore Roller Derby	Roller Derby	Women's Flat Track Derby Association	Asbury Park Convention Hall (3,600)	2007	0
Hoboken FC 1912	Soccer	Cosmopolitan Soccer League	Sinatra Park, Hoboken and Laurel Hill Park, Secaucus	1912	1
Cedar Stars Rush	Soccer	USL League Two	Fairleigh Dickinson University	2018	0
FC Motown	Soccer	USL League Two	Ranger Stadium (1,200)	2021	0
Morris Elite SC	Soccer	USL League Two	Livingston High School	2016	0
New Jersey Copa FC	Soccer	USL League Two	St. John Vianney High School	2015	0
Ocean City Nor'easters	Soccer	USL League Two	Carey Stadium (4,000)	1996	3
Real Central New Jersey	Soccer	USL League Two	Rider University	2020	0
Atlantic City FC	Soccer	National Premier Soccer League	Egg Harbor Township High School	2018	0
FC Monmouth	Soccer	National Premier Soccer League	Count Basie Park	2018	0
FC Motown	Soccer	National Premier Soccer League	Ranger Stadium (1,200)	2012	1
New Jersey Copa FC	Soccer	United Women's Soccer	Mercer County Community College	2015	0
PSA Wildcats	Soccer	Women's Premier Soccer League	Woodbridge High School	1996	0
NJ Wizards SC	Soccer	Women's Premier Soccer League	Cedar Grove High School	-	0

=== New York metropolitan minor league teams that play in New Jersey ===
Club	Sport	League	Stadium (capacity)	Established	Titles
New York Red Bulls II	Soccer	MLS Next Pro	MSU Soccer Park at Pittser Field (5,000)	2015	2
New York Red Bulls U-23	Soccer	USL League Two	Red Bulls Training Facility	2009	2
New York Cosmos	Soccer	USL League One	Hinchliffe Stadium (10,000)	2026	0

== College sports ==
=== Major schools ===
New Jerseyans' collegiate allegiances are predominantly split among the three major NCAA Division I programs in the state – the Scarlet Knights of Rutgers University (New Jersey's flagship state university), members of the Big Ten Conference; the Pirates of Seton Hall University (the state's largest Catholic university), members of the Big East Conference; and the Tigers of Princeton University (the state's Ivy League university). Additionally, Red Hawks of Montclair State University—one of the largest public universities in the state—compete at the NCAA Division III level and have a strong following in northern New Jersey.

Rutgers and Princeton athletics share an intense rivalry – stemming from the first intercollegiate football game in 1869 – though the two schools have not met on the football field since 1980. They continue to play each other annually in all other sports offered by the two universities.

Rutgers, which fields 24 teams in various sports, is nationally known for its excellent football and women's basketball programs, owning a 6-4 all-time bowl record and appearing in a National Final in 2007, respectively. In 2008 and 2009, Rutgers expanded their football home SHI Stadium on the Busch Campus, and the basketball teams play at Jersey Mike's Arena on the Livingston Campus. Both venues and campuses are located in Piscataway, immediately across the Raritan River from New Brunswick. The university also fields rising men's basketball and baseball programs. Rutgers' fan base is mostly derived from the western parts of the state and Middlesex County, not to mention its alumni base, which is the largest in the state.

Rutgers' satellite campuses in Camden and Newark each field their own athletic programs. The Rutgers–Camden athletic teams are called the Scarlet Raptors. The Rutgers–Newark athletic teams are called the Scarlet Raiders. The Scarlet Raiders and the Scarlet Raptors both compete within NCAA Division III.

Seton Hall, unlike Rutgers and Princeton, does not field a football team. Its men's basketball team, however, is one of the Big East's storied programs, New Jersey's most successful representative in the NCAA Division I men's basketball tournament by number of wins, the state's only men's basketball program to reach a modern National Final, and plays its home games at Prudential Center in downtown Newark approximately four miles from the university's South Orange campus. The Pirates, while lacking as large an alumni base as the state university, have a large well of support in the predominantly Roman Catholic areas of the northern part of the state and the Jersey Shore. The annual inter-conference rivalry game between Seton Hall and Rutgers which alternates between Newark and Piscataway, the Garden State Hardwood Classic, has been renewed through 2026.

=== Other schools ===
The state's other Division I schools include the Monmouth University Hawks (West Long Branch), the New Jersey Institute of Technology (NJIT) Highlanders (Newark), the Rider University Broncs (Lawrenceville), and the Saint Peter's University Peacocks (Jersey City). Saint Peter's reached national prominence in 2022 when its men's basketball team became the first 15-seed (out of 16 teams in each region) ever to reach the Elite Eight (one step shy of the Final Four) in the NCAA tournament.

Fairleigh Dickinson University competes in both Division I and Division III. It has two campuses, each with its own sports teams. The teams at the Metropolitan Campus are known as the FDU Knights, and compete in the Northeast Conference and NCAA Division I. The College at Florham (FDU-Florham) teams are known as the FDU-Florham Devils and compete in NCAA Division III as a member of the Middle Atlantic Conference and its Freedom Conference. (Note: The Middle Atlantic Conference is an umbrella organization of three conferences. Two of its components, the Freedom and Commonwealth Conferences (officially styled as "MAC Freedom" and "MAC Commonwealth"), sponsor competition in 14 NCAA sports, but not football. The overall MAC organizes competition among both Commonwealth and Freedom members in 13 other sports, including football.) The Metropolitan Campus reached its own national prominence in 2023 when its men's basketball team became the second 16-seed to defeat a top regional seed in the NCAA men's tournament, beating top overall seed Purdue.

Among the various Division III schools in the state, the Stevens Ducks, representing Stevens Institute of Technology, have fielded the longest continuously running collegiate men's lacrosse program in the country. 2009 marked the 125th season.

== Golf ==
New Jersey has several notable golf courses, like Atlantic City Country Club, Baltusrol Golf Club, Liberty National Golf Club, Pine Valley Golf Club, Ridgewood Country Club, Scotland Run Golf Club and Trump National Golf Club Bedminster. Notable tournaments include The Northern Trust and Mizuho Americas Open.

Notable New Jerseyan golfers include Scottie Scheffler, Marina Alex, Megha Ganne, Al Besselink and Vic Ghezzi.

The United States Golf Association (USGA) headquarters and USGA Museum are located in Liberty Corner.

== Horse racing ==
The Meadowlands Sports Complex is also home to the Meadowlands Racetrack, the major harness racing track in the state. The former Freehold Raceway in Freehold was also a harness racing track but closed in December 2024. It was the oldest racetrack in the United States. Monmouth Park Racetrack in Oceanport is a popular spot for thoroughbred racing in New Jersey and the Northeast. It's marquee event is the Haskell Invitational Stakes. It hosted the Breeders' Cup in 2007, and its turf course was renovated in preparation.

Former racetracks include Garden State Park Racetrack and Atlantic City Race Course.

== Ultimate ==
Ultimate, originally known as ultimate Frisbee, originated and was developed in Maplewood in 1968 with the first sanctioned game at Columbia High School between the student council and student newspaper staff.

== High school sports ==
New Jersey high schools are divided into divisions under the New Jersey State Interscholastic Athletic Association.(NJSIAA)' Founded in 1918, the NJSIAA currently represents 22,000 schools, 330,000 coaches, and almost 4.5 million athletes. Sports are divided between 3 seasons (fall, winter, and spring).

== Academies and clubs ==
New Jersey also features a collection of sports leagues, clubs, and academies for athletic training. Like many suburban communities, most New Jersey towns have individual leagues for America's most popular sports - baseball, softball, football, cheerleading, basketball, soccer, etc.

== Stadiums and arenas ==
Venue	City	Capacity	Type	Tenants	Opened
SHI Stadium	Piscataway	52,454	Football	Rutgers Scarlet Knights	1994
Jadwin Gymnasium	Princeton	6,854	Arena	Princeton Tigers	1969
Jersey Mike's Arena	Piscataway	8,000	Arena	Rutgers Scarlet Knights	1977
MetLife Stadium	East Rutherford	82,500	Multi-purpose	New York Giants, New York Jets	2010
Princeton Stadium	Princeton	27,773	Football	Princeton Tigers	1998
Prudential Center	Newark	18,711	Arena	New Jersey Devils, Seton Hall Pirates, New York Sirens	2007
Sports Illustrated Stadium	Harrison	25,000	Soccer	New York Red Bulls, Gotham FC	2010
ShoreTown Ballpark	Lakewood	6,588	Baseball	Jersey Shore BlueClaws	2001
TD Bank Ballpark	Bridgewater	6,100	Baseball	Somerset Patriots	1999
Trenton Thunder Ballpark	Trenton	6,440	Baseball	Trenton Thunder	1994
The Soccer Stadium at Yurcak Field	Piscataway	5,000	Soccer	Rutgers Scarlet Knights	1994
MSU Soccer Park at Pittser Field	Montclair	5,000	Soccer	New York Red Bulls II, Montclair State Red Hawks	1998

== Other notable sports venues ==
- CURE Insurance Arena
- Hinchliffe Stadium
- Hobey Baker Memorial Rink
- Jersey City Armory
- New Jersey Motorsports Park
- Old Bridge Township Raceway Park
- Richard J. Codey Arena
- Roberts Stadium
- Run Baby Run Arena
- Skylands Stadium
- Wall Stadium
- Walsh Gymnasium
- Wellness and Events Center
- Yogi Berra Stadium

=== Former notable sports venues ===
- Bears & Eagles Riverfront Stadium
- Boyle's Thirty Acres
- Giants Stadium
- Harrison Park
- Meadowlands Arena
- Meadowlands Grand Prix
- Roosevelt Stadium
- Ruppert Stadium
- Trenton Speedway

== See also ==
- List of college athletic programs in New Jersey
- Sports Hall of Fame of New Jersey
- New Jersey Sports Writers Association Hall of Fame
- Sports in Jersey City, New Jersey
