= List of college athletic programs in New Jersey =

This is a list of college athletic programs in the U.S. state of New Jersey.

Notes:

- This list is in a tabular format, with columns arranged in the following order, from left to right:
  - Athletic team description (short school name and nickname), with a link to the school's athletic program article if it exists. When only one nickname is listed, it is used for teams of both sexes. (Note that in recent years, many schools have chosen to use the same nickname for men's and women's teams even when the nickname is distinctly masculine.) When two nicknames are given, the first is used for men's teams and the other is used for women's teams. Different nicknames for a specific sport within a school are noted separately below the table.
  - Full name of school.
  - Location of school.
  - Conference of the school (if conference column is left blank, the school is either independent or the conference is unknown).
- Apart from the ongoing conversions, the following notes apply:
  - Following the normal standard of U.S. sports media, the terms "University" and "College" are ignored in alphabetization, unless necessary to distinguish schools (such as Boston College and Boston University) or are actually used by the media in normally describing the school (formerly the case for the College of Charleston, but national media now use "Charleston" to describe that school's athletic program).
  - Schools are also alphabetized by the names they are most commonly referred to by sports media, with non-intuitive examples included in parentheses next to the school name. This means, for example, that campuses bearing the name "University of North Carolina" may variously be found at "C" (Charlotte), "N" (North Carolina, referring to the Chapel Hill campus), and "U" (the Asheville, Greensboro, Pembroke, and Wilmington campuses, all normally referred to as UNC-{campus name}).
  - The prefix "St.", as in "Saint", is alphabetized as if it were spelled out.

== NCAA ==
=== Division I ===
Full NCAA Division I member colleges in New Jersey.
– FBS Football, – FCS Football, – Non-football

| Team | School | City | Conference | Sport sponsorship | | | | | | | | |
| Team | School | City | Conference | Foot- ball | Basketball | | Base- ball | Soft- ball | Ice hockey | | Soccer | |
| Team | School | City | Conference | Foot- ball | M | W | Base- ball | Soft- ball | M | W | M | W |
|---|---|---|---|---|---|---|---|---|---|---|---|---|
| Fairleigh Dickinson Knights | Fairleigh Dickinson University | Teaneck | Northeast | No | Yes | Yes | Yes | Yes | No | No | Yes | Yes |
| Monmouth Hawks | Monmouth University | West Long Branch | CAA | FCS (Note: Monmouth's football team competes in CAA Football, a technically separate entity operated by the all-sports CAA.) | Yes | Yes | Yes | Yes | No | No | Yes | Yes |
| NJIT Highlanders | New Jersey Institute of Technology | Newark | America East | No | Yes | Yes | Yes | No | No | No | Yes | Yes |
| Princeton Tigers | Princeton University | Princeton | Ivy League | FCS | Yes | Yes | Yes | Yes | Yes (Note: Princeton's ice hockey teams compete in ECAC Hockey.) | Yes | Yes | Yes |
| Rider Broncs | Rider University | Lawrenceville | Metro | No | Yes | Yes | Yes | Yes | No | No | Yes | Yes |
| Rutgers Scarlet Knights | Rutgers University–New Brunswick | New Brunswick | Big Ten | FBS | Yes | Yes | Yes | Yes | No | No | Yes | Yes |
| Saint Peter's Peacocks | Saint Peter's University | Jersey City | Metro | No | Yes | Yes | Yes | Yes | No | No | Yes | Yes |
| Seton Hall Pirates | Seton Hall University | South Orange | Big East | No | Yes | Yes | Yes | Yes | No | No | Yes | Yes |

=== Division II ===
Full NCAA Division II member colleges in New Jersey.
- Non-football, - Sprint football

| Team | School | City | Conference | Sport sponsorship | | | | | | |
| Team | School | City | Conference | Foot- ball | Basketball | | Base- ball | Soft- ball | Soccer | |
| Team | School | City | Conference | Foot- ball | M | W | Base- ball | Soft- ball | M | W |
|---|---|---|---|---|---|---|---|---|---|---|
| Caldwell Cougars | Caldwell University | Caldwell | Central Atlantic | (Note: Caldwell fields a team in sprint football, a weight-restricted form of football not governed by the NCAA, as a member of the Collegiate Sprint Football League.) | Yes | Yes | Yes | Yes | Yes | Yes |
| Felician Golden Falcons | Felician University | Lodi | Central Atlantic | No | Yes | Yes | Yes | Yes | Yes | Yes |
| Georgian Court Lions | Georgian Court University | Lakewood | Central Atlantic | No | Yes | Yes | Yes | Yes | Yes | Yes |

=== Division III ===
| Team | School | City | Conference | Sport sponsorship | | | | | | |
| Team | School | City | Conference | Foot- ball | Basketball | | Base- ball | Soft- ball | Soccer | |
| Team | School | City | Conference | Foot- ball | M | W | Base- ball | Soft- ball | M | W |
|---|---|---|---|---|---|---|---|---|---|---|
| Centenary Cyclones | Centenary University | Hackettstown | Atlantic East | No | Yes | Yes | Yes | Yes | Yes | Yes |
| Drew Rangers | Drew University | Madison | Landmark | No | Yes | Yes | Yes | Yes | Yes | Yes |
| FDU Florham Devils | Fairleigh Dickinson University, Florham | Madison | MAC (Freedom) | Yes | Yes | Yes | Yes | Yes | Yes | Yes |
| Kean Cougars | Kean University | Union | New Jersey | Yes | Yes | Yes | Yes | Yes | Yes | Yes |
| Montclair State Red Hawks | Montclair State University | Upper Montclair | New Jersey | Yes | Yes | Yes | Yes | Yes | Yes | Yes |
| Ramapo Roadrunners | Ramapo College of New Jersey | Mahwah | New Jersey | No | Yes | Yes | Yes | Yes | Yes | Yes |
| Rowan Profs | Rowan University | Glassboro | New Jersey | Yes | Yes | Yes | Yes | Yes | Yes | Yes |
| Rutgers–Camden Scarlet Raptors | Rutgers University–Camden | Camden | New Jersey | No | Yes | Yes | Yes | Yes | Yes | Yes |
| Rutgers–Newark Scarlet Raiders | Rutgers University–Newark | Newark | New Jersey | No | Yes | Yes | Yes | Yes | Yes | Yes |
| Saint Elizabeth Eagles | Saint Elizabeth University | Morristown | Atlantic East | No | Yes | Yes | Yes | Yes | Yes | Yes |
| Stevens Ducks | Stevens Institute of Technology | Hoboken | MAC (Freedom) | No | Yes | Yes | Yes | Yes | Yes | Yes |
| Stockton Ospreys | Stockton University | Galloway | New Jersey | No | Yes | Yes | Yes | Yes | Yes | Yes |
| TCNJ Lions | The College of New Jersey | Ewing | New Jersey | Yes | Yes | Yes | Yes | Yes | Yes | Yes |
| William Paterson Pioneers | William Paterson University | Wayne | New Jersey | Yes | Yes | Yes | Yes | Yes | Yes | Yes |

== NJCAA ==
| Team | School | City | Conference |
|---|---|---|---|
| Atlantic Cape Buccaneers | Atlantic Cape Community College | Mays Landing | Garden State |
| Bergen County Bulldogs | Bergen Community College | Paramus | Garden State |
| Brookdale Jersey Blues | Brookdale Community College | Lincroft | Garden State |
| Burlington County Barons | Rowan College at Burlington County | Pemberton | Garden State |
| Camden County Cougars | Camden County College | Blackwood | Garden State |
| Cumberland County Dukes | Cumberland County College | Vineland | Garden State |
| Essex County Wolverines | Essex County College | Newark | Garden State |
| Gloucester County Roadrunners | Rowan College at Gloucester County | Sewell | Garden State |
| Mercer County Vikings | Mercer County Community College | Trenton | Garden State |
| Middlesex Colts | Middlesex College | Edison | Garden State |
| Morris County Titans | County College of Morris | Randolph | Garden State |
| Ocean County Vikings | Ocean County College | Toms River | Garden State |
| Passaic County Panthers | Passaic County Community College | Paterson | Garden State |
| Raritan Valley Golden Lions | Raritan Valley Community College | North Branch | Garden State |
| Sussex County Skylanders | Sussex County Community College | Newton | Garden State |
| Union County Owls | Union County College | Cranford | Garden State |
| Warren Golden Eagles | Warren County Community College | Washington | Garden State |

== USCAA ==
| Team | School | City |
|---|---|---|
| Bloomfield Bears | Bloomfield College | Bloomfield |
| Kean Jersey City Gothic Knights | Kean Jersey City | Jersey City |

== See also ==
- List of NCAA Division I institutions
- List of NCAA Division II institutions
- List of NCAA Division III institutions
- List of NAIA institutions
- List of USCAA institutions
- List of NCCAA institutions
- List of NJCAA Division I institutions
- List of NJCAA Division II institutions
- List of NJCAA Division III institutions
