= Garden State Athletic Conference =

Junior college athletic conference

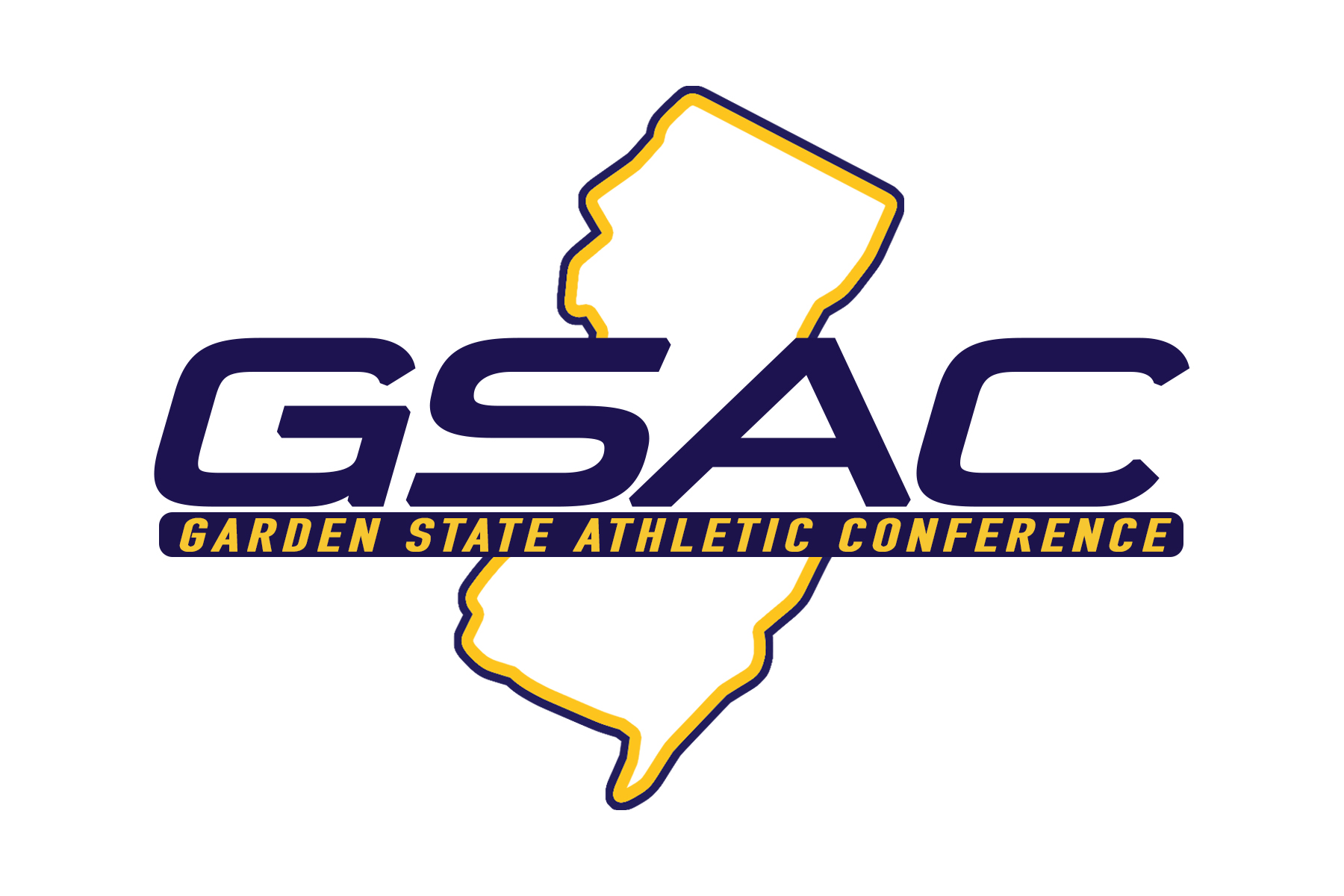
- Association: NJCAA
- Founded: 1974
- Sports fielded: 18 (10 men's, 8 women's)
- No. of teams: 16
- Region: New Jersey – NJCAA Region 19

The Garden State Athletic Conference (GSAC) is a junior college conference in the National Junior College Athletic Association (NJCAA) for many technical and community colleges in New Jersey. And it is one conference in the Region 19 of the NJCAA. Conference championships are held in most sports and individuals can be named to All-Conference and All-Academic teams.

== Member schools ==
=== Current members ===
The GSAC currently has 16 full members, all are public schools:

Institution	Location (Note: All cities are located within the State of New Jersey.)	Founded	Affiliation	Enrollment	Nickname	Joined
Atlantic Cape Community College	Mays Landing	1966	Public (Note: Part of the New Jersey County Colleges System.)	6,500	Buccaneers	?
Bergen Community College	Paramus	1965	Public	19,152	Bulldogs	?
Brookdale Community College	Lincroft	1967	Public	14,360	Jersey Blues	?
Camden County College	Blackwood	1967	Public	11,000	Cougars	?
County College of Morris	Randolph	1968	Public	7,000	Titans	?
Essex County College	Newark	1966	Public	18,087	Wolverines	?
Mercer County Community College	West Windsor	1966	Public	7,000	Vikings	?
Middlesex College	Edison	1964	Public	13,000	Colts	?
Ocean County College	Toms River	1964	Public	7,480	Vikings	?
Passaic County Community College	Paterson	1971	Public	9,548	Panthers	?
Raritan Valley Community College	North Branch	1965	Public	8,484	Golden Lions	?
Rowan College of South Jersey at Cumberland (RCSJ–Cumberland)	Vineland	2019	Public	9,792	Dukes	2019
Rowan College of South Jersey at Gloucester (RCSJ–Gloucester)	Sewell	2019	Public	9,792	Roadrunners	2019
Salem Community College	Carneys Point	1958	Public	900	Mighty Oaks	?
Sussex County Community College	Newton	1981	Public	2,800	Skylanders	?
Union College	Cranford	1933	Public	8,298	Owls	?

=== Former members ===
The GSAC had five former full members, all but one were public schools:

Institution	Location	Founded	Affiliation	Enrollment	Nickname	Joined	Left	Current conference
Delaware Technical & Community College at Charles L. Terry (Note: This campus sponsors men's lacrosse.)	Dover, Delaware	1972	Public	14,029	?	?	?	Eastern Pennsylvania (EPAC) (NJCAA Region XIX)
Delaware Technical & Community College at Jack F. Owens (Note: This campus sponsors baseball and softball, as well as men's & women's cross country.)	Georgetown, Delaware	1966	Public	14,029	?	?	?	Eastern Pennsylvania (EPAC) (NJCAA Region XIX)
Delaware Technical & Community College at Stanton-Wilmington (Note: This campus sponsors men's & women's basketball and women's volleyball.)	Stanton, Delaware	1973	Public	14,029	?	?	?	Eastern Pennsylvania (EPAC) (NJCAA Region XIX)
Rowan College at Burlington County (RCBC)	Mount Laurel, New Jersey	1966	Public (Note: Part of the New Jersey County Colleges System.)	3,474	Barons	?	2021	N/A (Note: Discontinued its intercollegiate athletics program.)
Thaddeus Stevens College of Technology (Thaddeus Stevens Tech)	Lancaster, Pennsylvania	1905	Public	1,200	Bulldogs	?	?	Eastern Pennsylvania (EPAC) (NJCAA Region XIX)

== See also ==
- Eastern Pennsylvania Athletic Conference (EPAC)
- Pennsylvania Collegiate Athletic Association (PCAA)
