= Freehold Township, New Jersey =

Township in Monmouth County, New Jersey

- Township
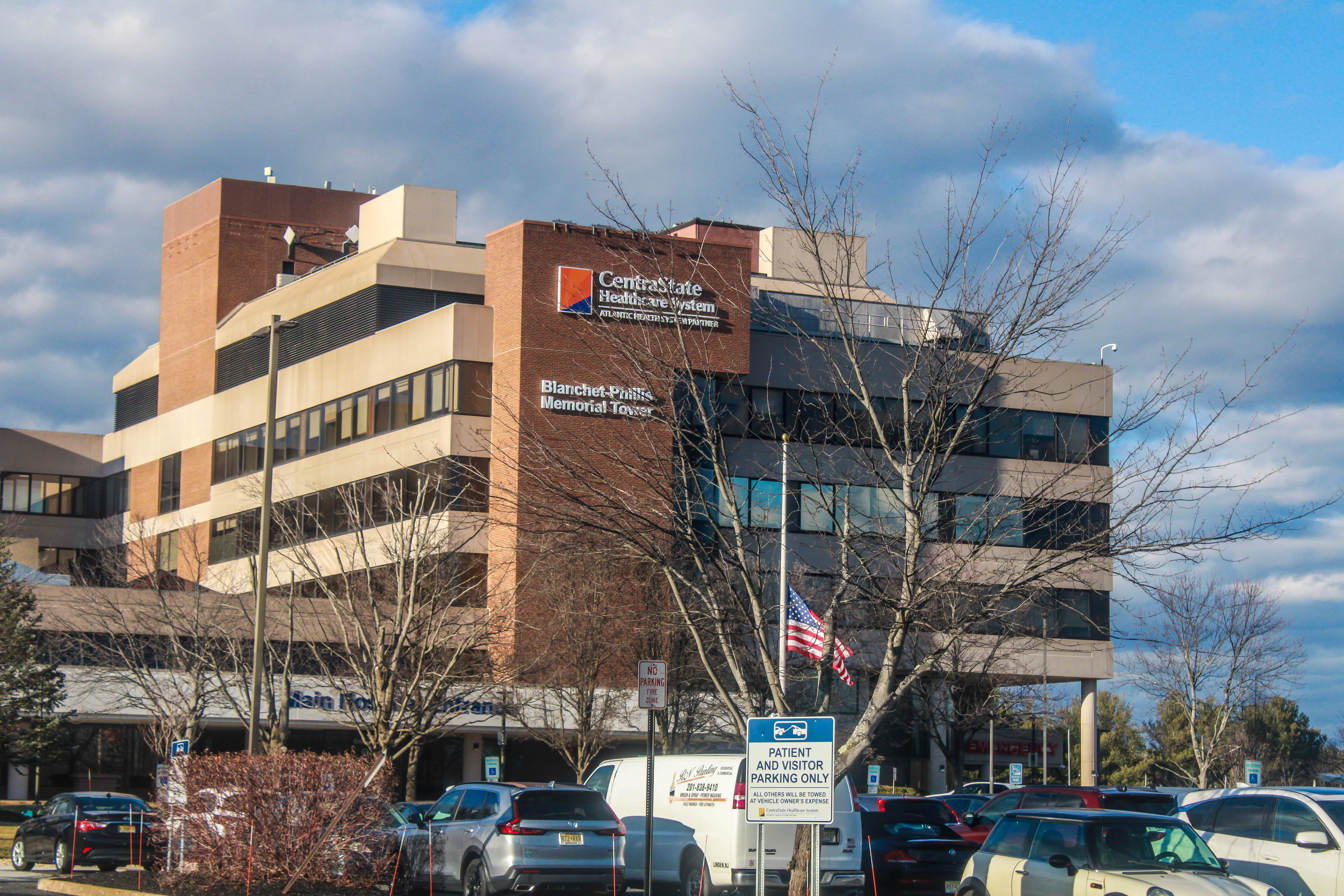
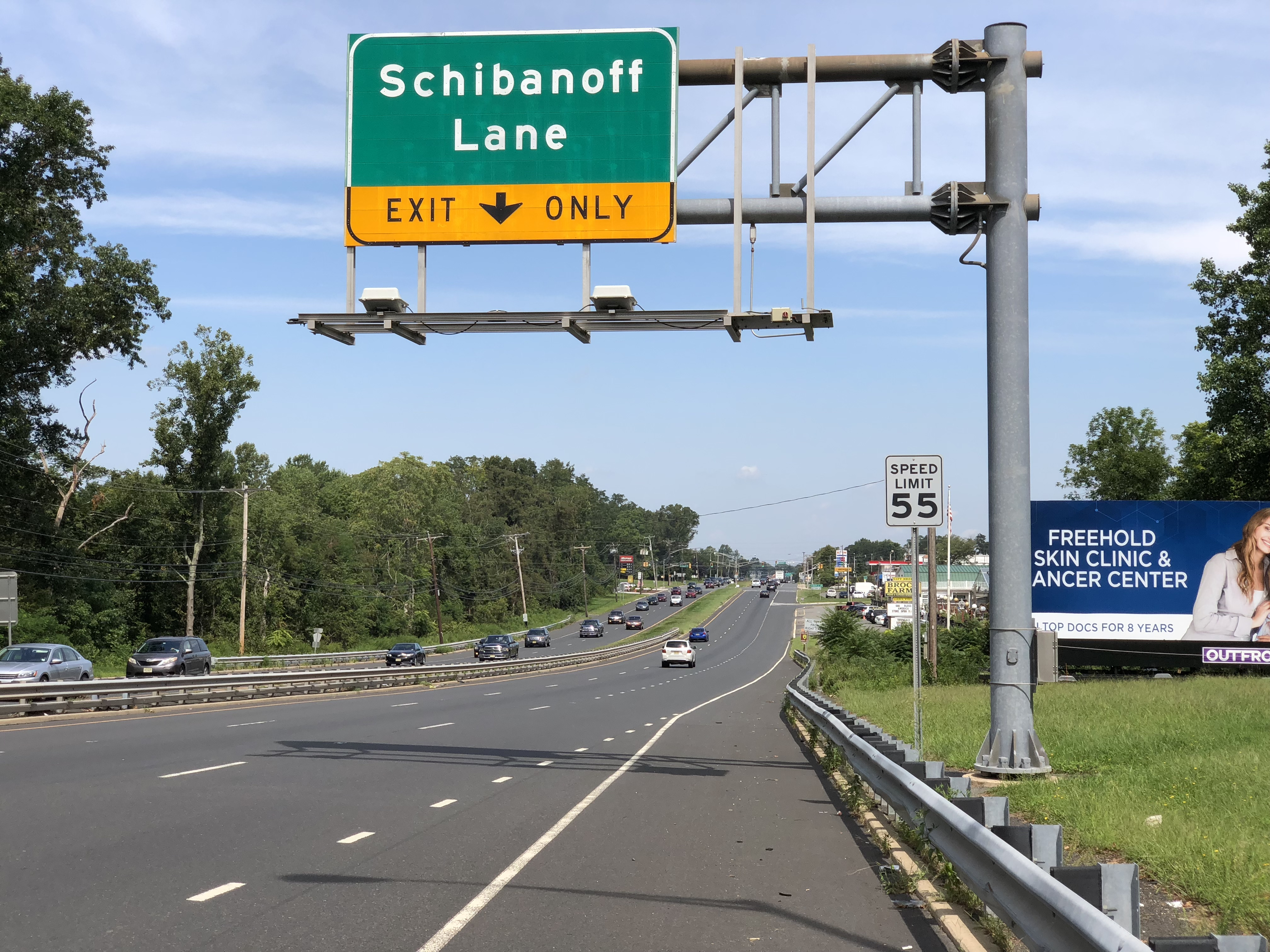
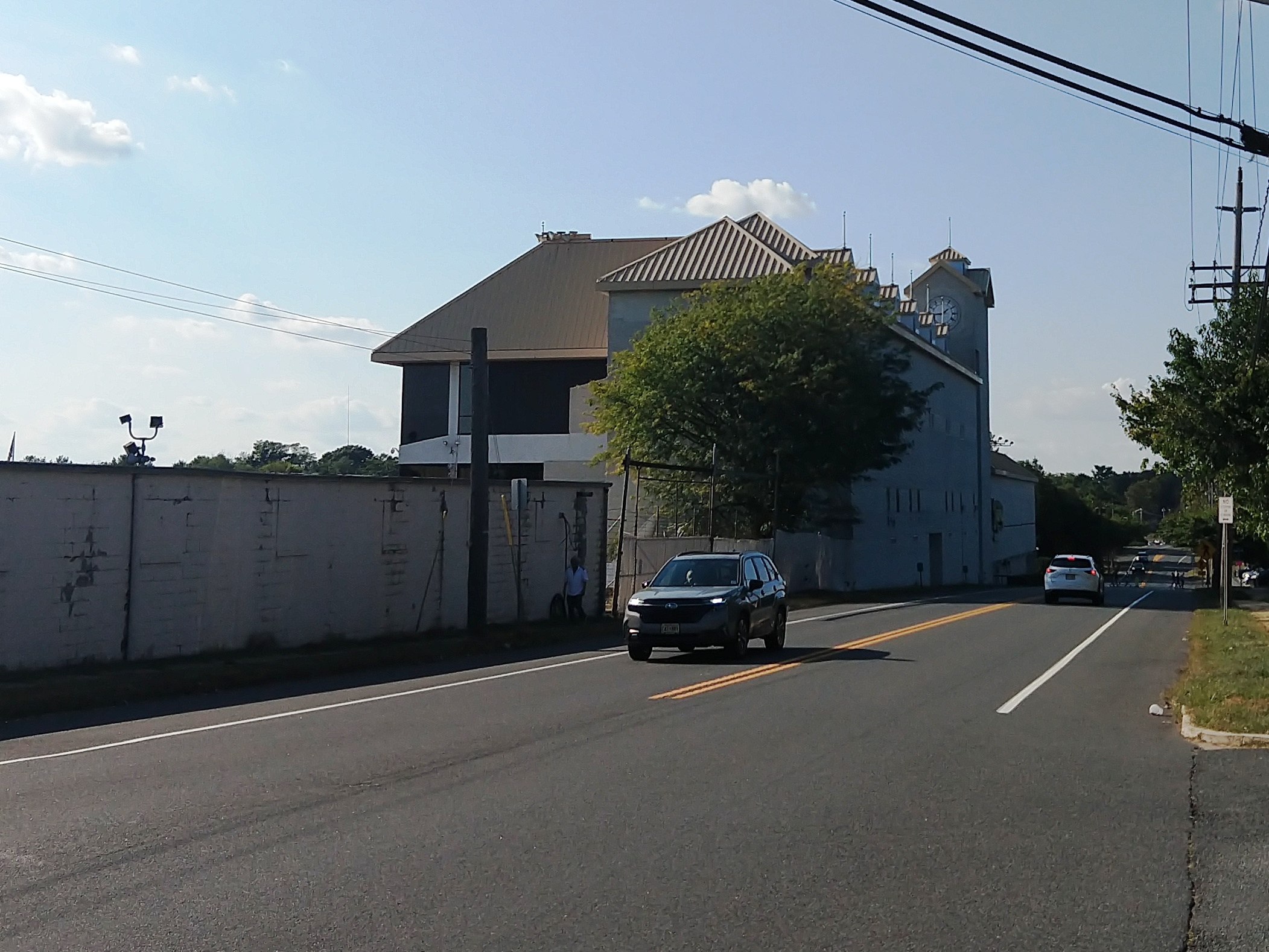
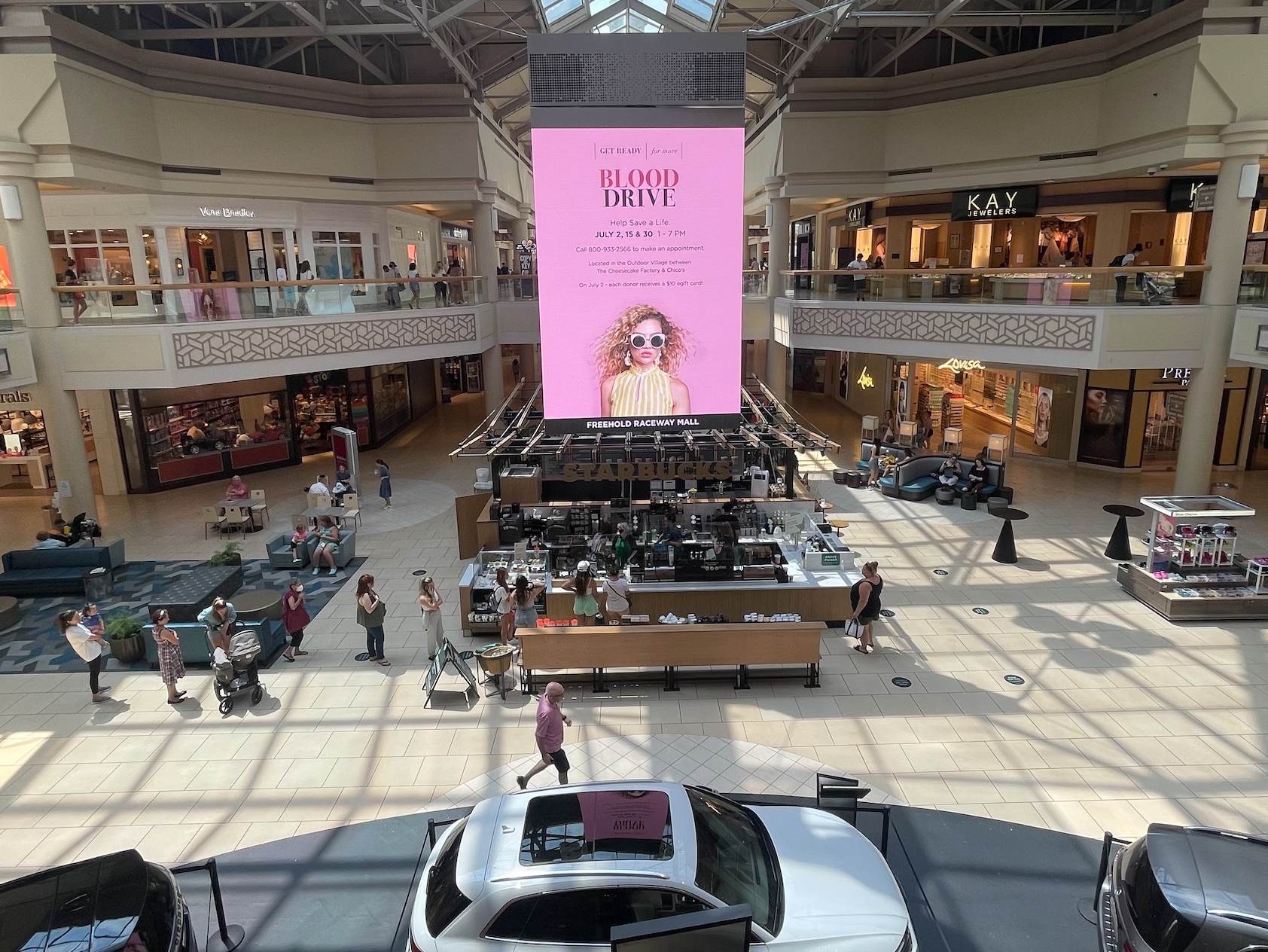
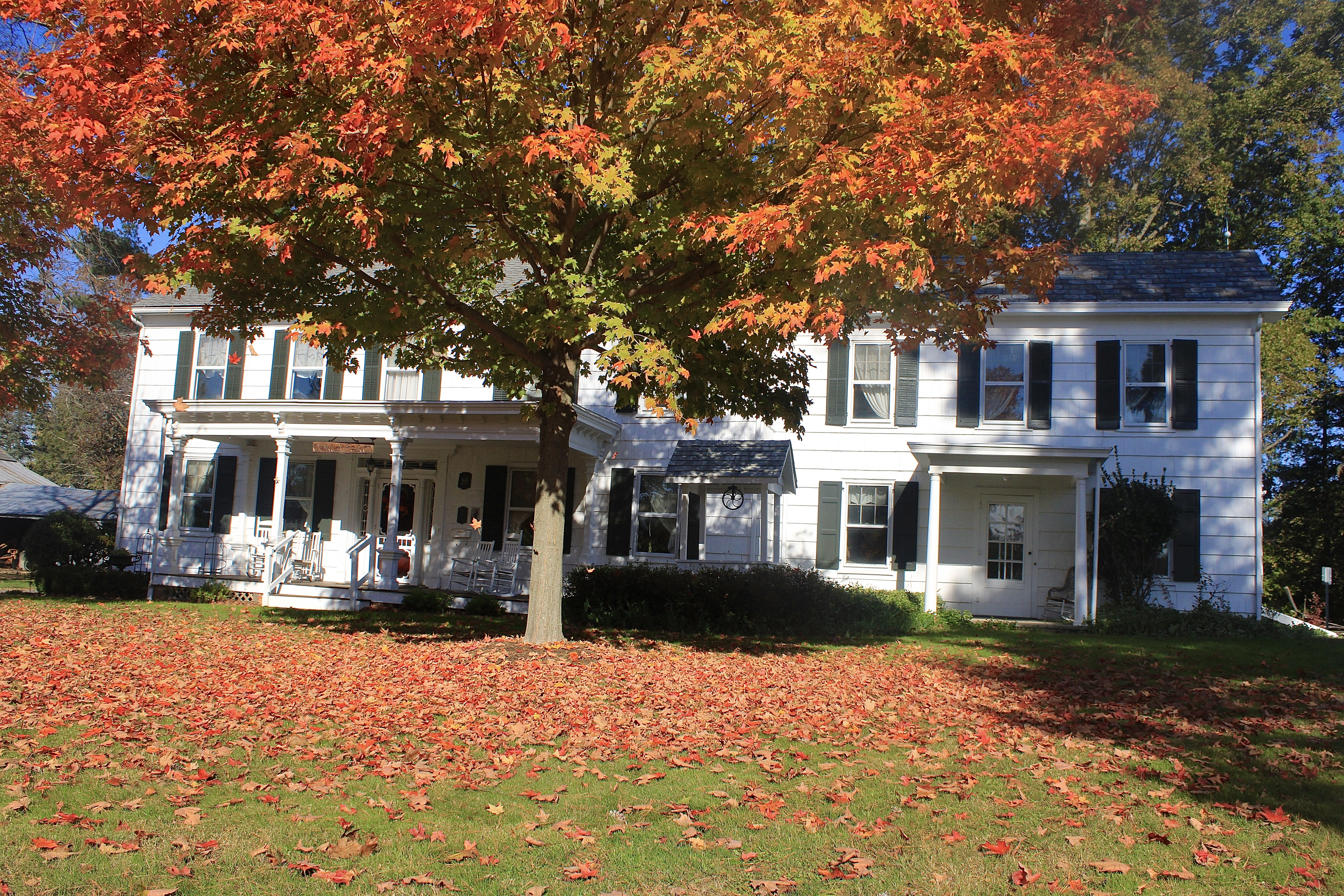
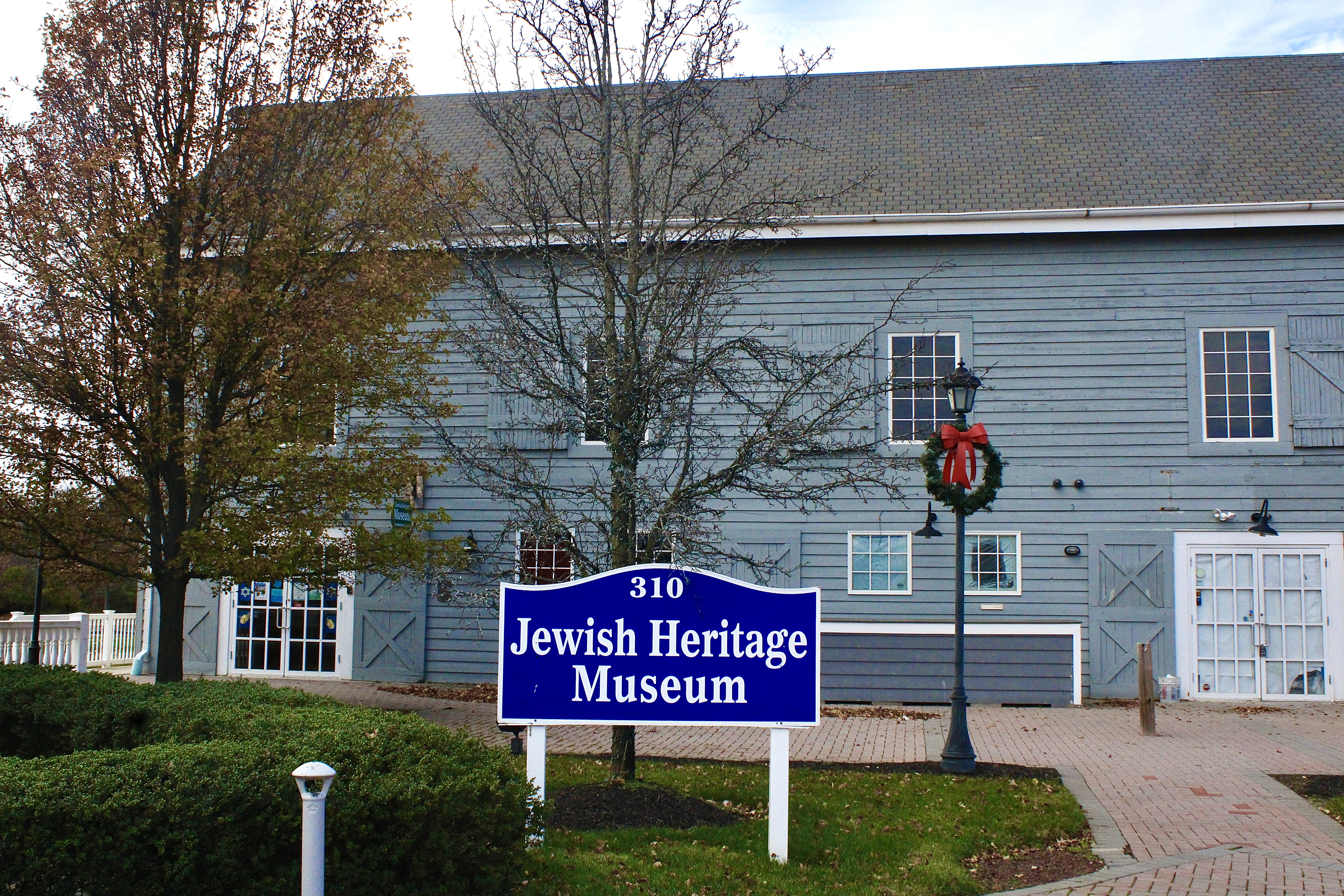
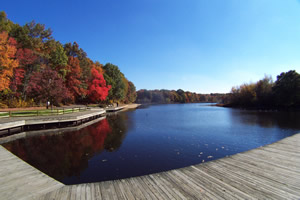
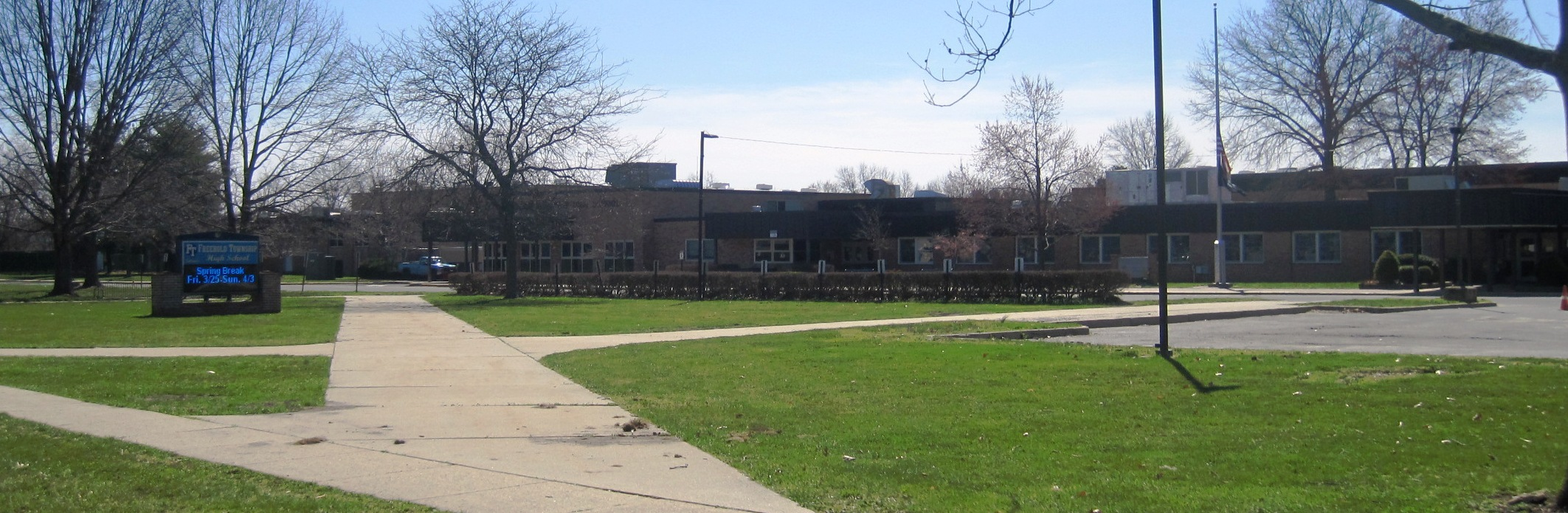
- Craig House in Monmouth Battlefield State Park CentraState Medical Center U.S. 9 Freehold Raceway Freehold Raceway Mall Walker-Combs-Hartshorne Farmstead Jewish Heritage Museum Turkey Swamp Park Freehold Township High School

- Seal
- Motto: Western Monmouth's Family Town
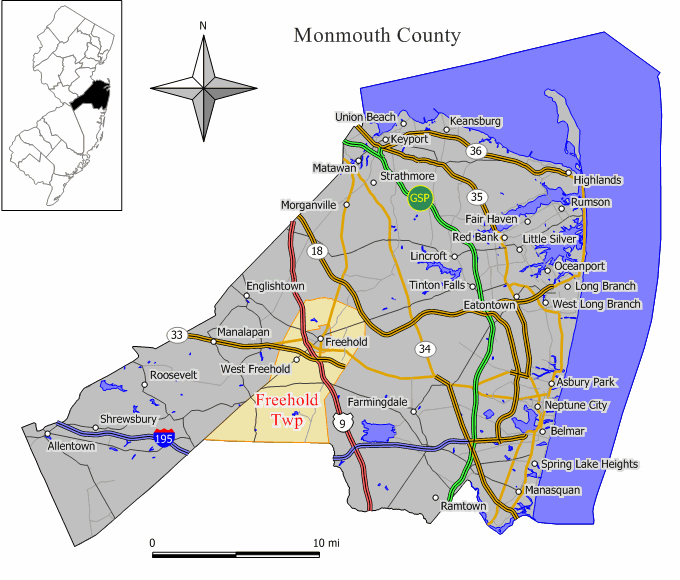
- Location of Freehold Township in Monmouth County highlighted in yellow (right). Inset map: Location of Monmouth County in New Jersey highlighted in black (left).

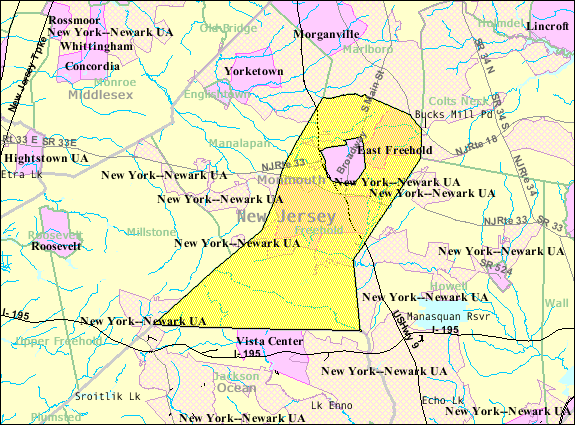
- Census Bureau map of Freehold Township, New Jersey
- Interactive map of Freehold Township, New Jersey
- Location in Monmouth County Location in New Jersey Location in the United States
- Coordinates: 40.224382°N 74.299051°W
- Country: United States
- State: New Jersey
- County: Monmouth
- Established: October 31, 1693
- Incorporated: February 21, 1798
- Named for: English legal term of freehold

Government
  - Type: Township
  - Body: Township Committee
  - Mayor: Maureen Fasano (R, term ends December 31, 2025)
  - Administrator: Peter R. Valesi
  - Municipal clerk: Sanabel Abouzeina

Area
  - Total: 38.88 sq mi (100.71 km^{2})
  - Land: 38.65 sq mi (100.11 km^{2})
  - Water: 0.23 sq mi (0.59 km^{2}) 0.59%
  - Rank: 59th of 565 in state 4th of 53 in county
- Elevation: 118 ft (36 m)

Population (2020)
  - Total: 35,369
  - Estimate (2023): 35,531
  - Rank: 67th of 565 in state 5th of 53 in county
  - Density: 915/sq mi (353/km^{2})
  - Rank: 393rd of 565 in state 46th of 53 in county
- Time zone: UTC−05:00 (Eastern (EST))
  - Summer (DST): UTC−04:00 (Eastern (EDT))
- ZIP Code: 07728
- Area codes: 732/848 and 908 (mobile)
- FIPS code: 3402525230
- GNIS feature ID: 0882116
- Website: www.twp.freehold.nj.us

Freehold Township is a township in western Monmouth County, in the U.S. state of New Jersey. Crisscrossed by several major highways, the township is a commercial hub for Central New Jersey (home to the Freehold Raceway and Freehold Raceway Mall) and is a suburban bedroom community of New York City, located within the Raritan Valley region of the much larger New York metropolitan area. The township is located roughly 38 miles (61 km) from Manhattan and about 20 miles (32 km) from Staten Island. As of the 2020 United States census, the township's population was 35,369, a decrease of 815 (−2.3%) from the 36,184 recorded at the 2010 census, which in turn reflected an increase of 4,647 (+14.7%) from the 31,537 counted in the 2000 census.

Freehold Township was first formed on October 31, 1693, and was incorporated as a township by an act of the New Jersey Legislature on February 21, 1798. Portions of Freehold Township were taken to form Upper Freehold Township (c. 1731), so some wills and official records following the split referred to "Lower Freehold Township" although the official name has always been Freehold Township. Additional portions formed Millstone Township (February 28, 1844), Jackson Township (March 6, 1844), Atlantic Township (February 18, 1847; now Colts Neck Township), Marlboro Township (February 17, 1848) and Manalapan Township (March 9, 1848). Freehold Borough was originally formed as a town within the township on March 25, 1869, and formally separated when it was reconstituted as a borough on April 15, 1919, including additional portions of the township.

The Battle of Monmouth was fought in June 1778 in what has been preserved as Monmouth Battlefield State Park, which is in Freehold Township and Manalapan.

== History ==
=== Early ===
The Lenni Lenape Native Americans were the earliest known people to live in the area that became Freehold. The Lenape were a hunter-gatherer society. They were largely sedentary, changing campsites seasonally. They were prolific hunters of small game and birds. They were also skilled fisherman, and were known to harvest vast amounts of clams from the bays and inlets on the Jersey Shore. They also practiced some agriculture to augment their food supply. During this time, an important crossroad of two major Lenape trails was located in the area of Freehold.

In 1498, John Cabot became the first European to sight this land. By the late 17th century, the English had begun to take over the area. In 1664, the Duke of York (later James II & VII) granted a patent to Sir George Carteret to develop the area. In 1685, Scottish Presbyterians from Scotland, along with English Baptists and Quakers from New England fleeing religious persecution at home, became the first to settle within the area. In 1693, along with Middletown and Shrewsbury, Freehold was established by act of legislature as one of the three original townships in Monmouth County. The name of the township comes from the word freehold, an English legal term describing fee simple property ownership.

=== Colonial ===
In 1714, when the colonial government was deciding where to locate the county seat and courthouse, Freeholder John Reid, the first Surveyor General of East Jersey, wanted the county seat located in Freehold. Reid's offer to sell the property to the Board of Chosen Freeholders at a heavily discounted price may have been the deciding factor in choosing Freehold—rather than Middletown or Shrewsbury—as the site of the county seat. As part of the deal, Reid placed a restrictive covenant in the deed that, should the property ever cease being used as a courthouse, ownership would revert to the Reid family. Direct descendants of John Reid still reside in Freehold Township.

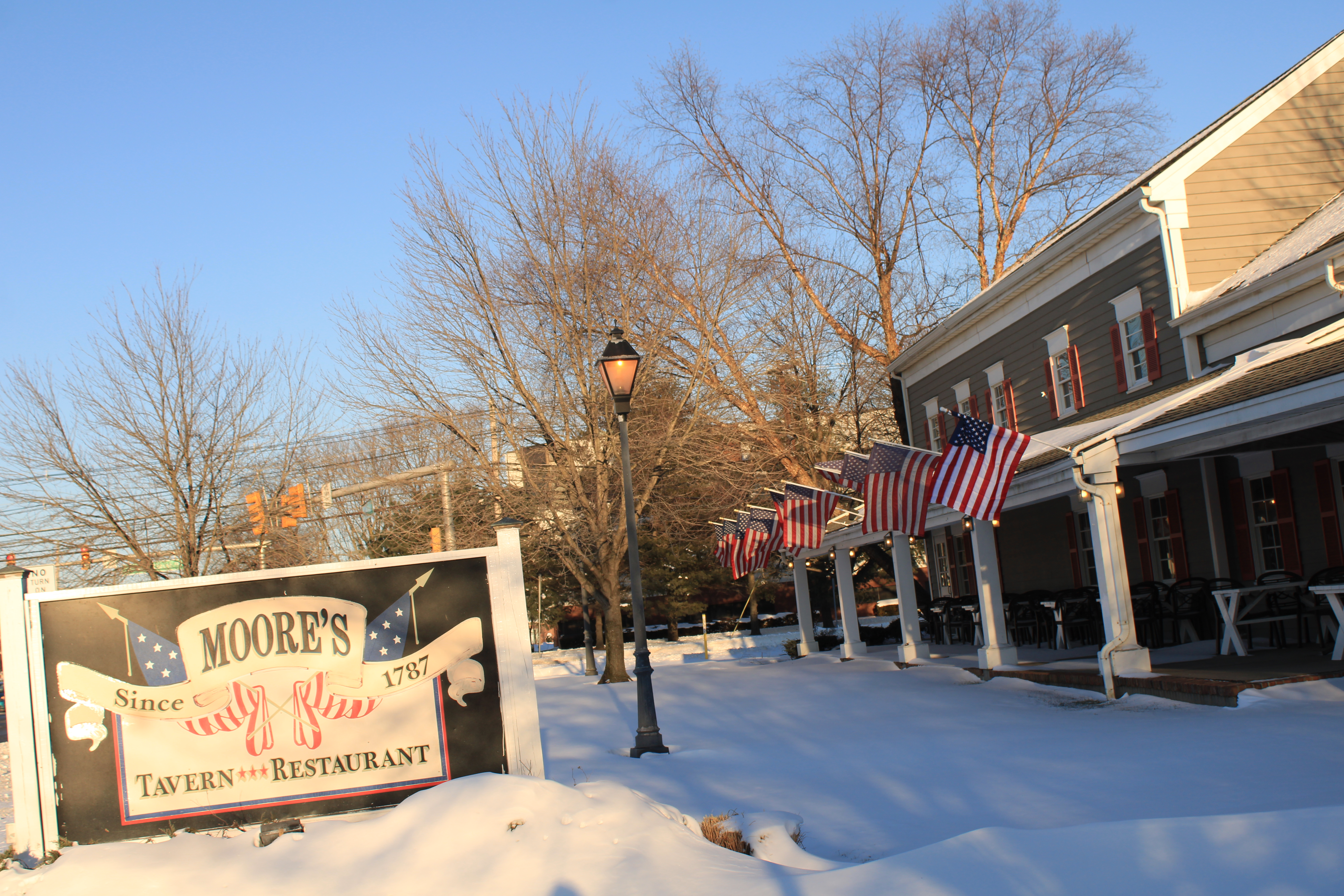
Moore's Tavern in the historic district of West Freehold. A mainstay in the township since 1787

Freehold was officially designated as the seat of the Monmouth County government, and a court house was commissioned to be built on the land purchased from John Reid. The Monmouth Courthouse opened in 1715. A small village quickly began to develop around the courthouse. At first, the village was called Monmouth Courthouse. Over time, other government buildings opened near the courthouse, including a sheriff's office, a prison, and a post office. A number of homes and commercial businesses also sprang up in the village, including a blacksmith, a general store, a bank, a hotel, and saloon.

In the area surrounding Monmouth Courthouse, many successful farms began to appear. The farms in Freehold were particularly well known for the production of potatoes, beans, and rye, which were sold in the markets of nearby cities. Freehold also became known for its excellent horse farms. The differences within Freehold between the growing settlement around the courthouse and the surrounding farmland were the seeds for the eventual division of Freehold into two separate municipalities in the early 20th century.

As of 1745, the majority of families in Freehold were still Scottish immigrants. In modern Freehold, many important streets bear the name of early colonial families, including Barkalow, Applegate, Rhea, Throckmorton, and Schanck.

=== Revolutionary War ===
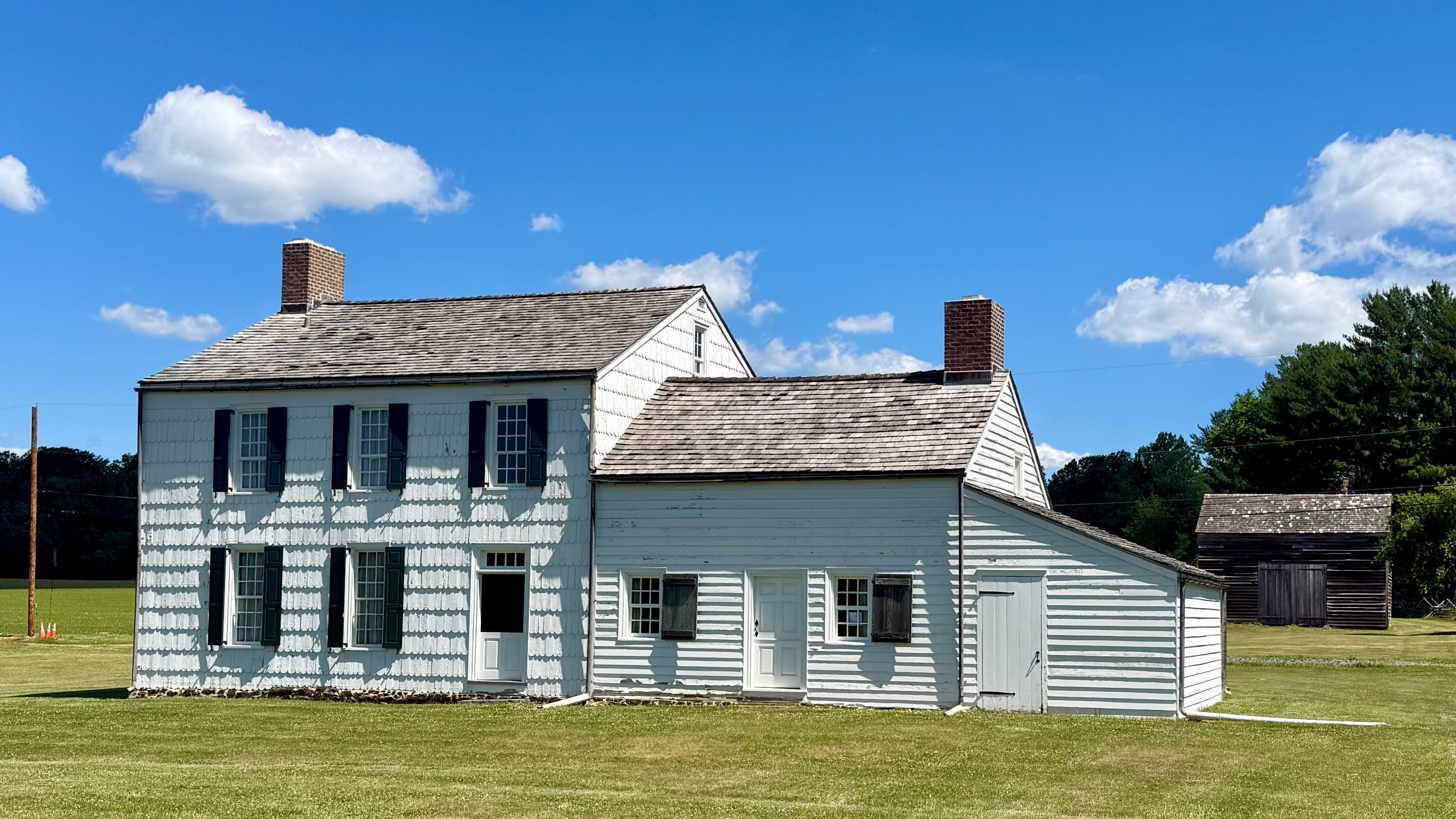
This 18th Century home, also known as the Craig House, was quartered by British troops during the Battle of Monmouth

Freehold was deeply impacted by the American Revolution. In 1765 with the passage of the Stamp Act, dissidents in Middletown and Upper Freehold established Sons of Liberty groups. In late 1775, Capt. Elias Longstreet recruited the first company of colonists from the county to join the Continental Army for an ill-fated invasion of Canada. Freehold was a known center of patriot activity. The Declaration of Independence was publicly proclaimed, read aloud, from the steps of the Monmouth Courthouse just a few days after being signed in Philadelphia.

After British success at the Battle of Long Island, Freehold and all of Monmouth County fell under the control of Loyalists. The British government continued to operate the Monmouth Courthouse, and several people involved in revolutionary activities were arrested and tried for treason at the courthouse. The success of the Continental Army at the Battle of Trenton helped to weaken loyalist control of Freehold.

In June 1778, the British Army began a major strategic evacuation of the city of Philadelphia. They attempted to protect a long, slow moving column of Loyalist families, equipment, and other supplies seized in Philadelphia, as they moved toward ships in New York Harbor. On June 28, 1778, the Continental Army intercepted the column in Freehold. The Battle of Monmouth was one of the largest battles of the Revolutionary War, involving over 25,000 soldiers combined in Continental, British, and Hessian forces. The initial engagement was in doubt until Washington arrived because Charles Lee was retreating from the battlefield. Washington rallied the Continentals and strongly engaged the British forces and they held their ground on the battlefield. British forces met their primary goal, the evacuation of Philadelphia. Both sides claimed victory in the battle.

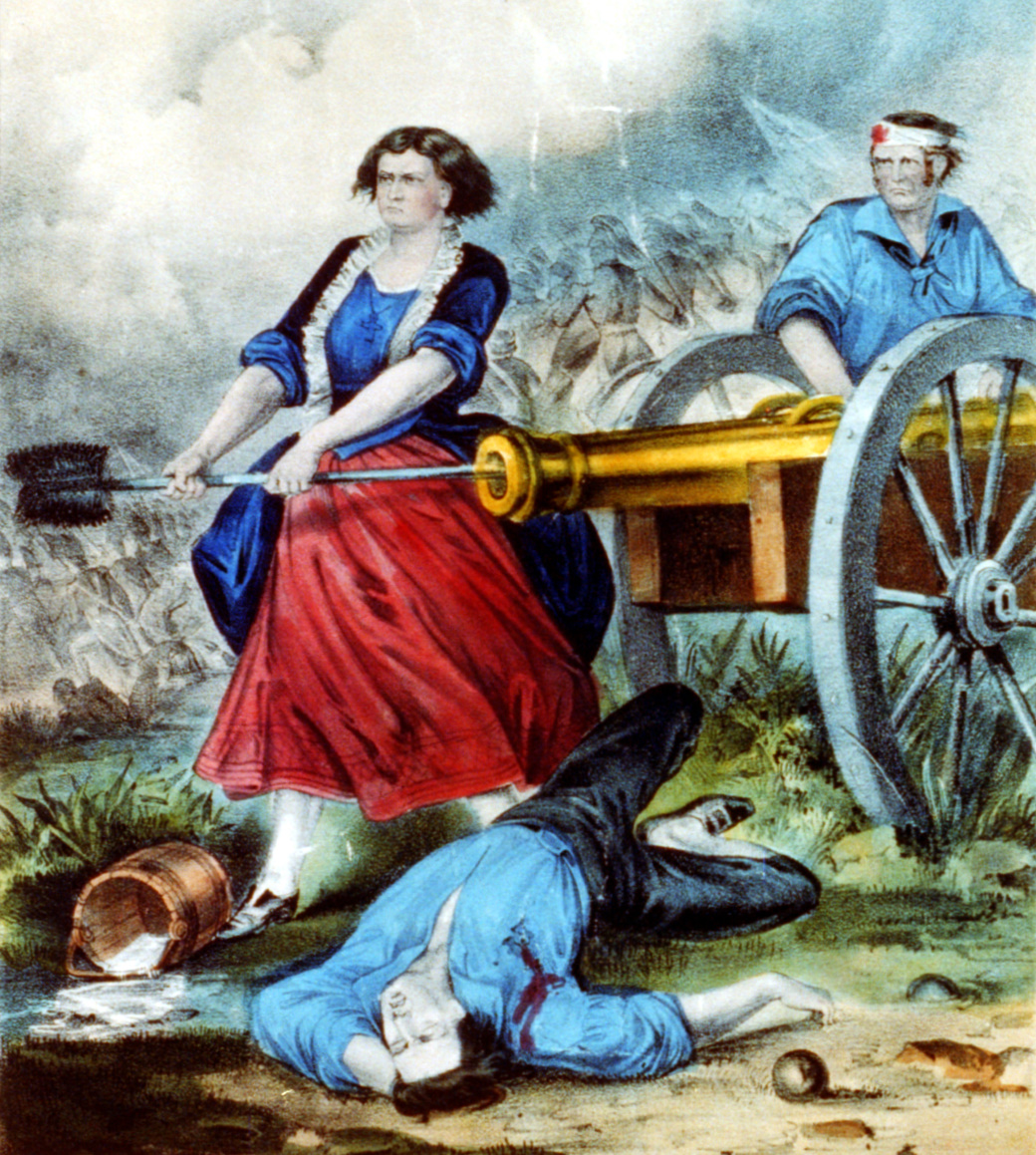
Molly Pitcher fighting at the Battle of Monmouth in Freehold, New Jersey

Several famous figures from the Revolutionary War fought at the Battle of Monmouth. British forces were commanded by Sir Henry Clinton and Charles Cornwallis. The Continental Army was commanded by George Washington and Charles Lee. Charles Lee was later court martialed by the Continental Army for his actions at the Battle of Monmouth. Nathanael Greene, Alexander Hamilton, "Mad" Anthony Wayne, the Marquis de Lafayette and Friedrich Wilhelm von Steuben also fought at the Battle of Monmouth for the Continental Army. Another famous figure at the Battle of Monmouth was Molly Pitcher, who manned a cannon during the battle after her husband was wounded.

In the aftermath of the Battle of Monmouth, Loyalist control of Freehold faltered. The township ceased to have a functioning municipal government and the courthouse was closed until the end of the war. Minor clashes between loyalists and continentals flared up in town, with the violence peaking around 1780. Colonel Tye was an escaped slave formerly named Titus, and the leader of a prominent loyalist guerrilla force, which conducted several raids in and around Freehold. In one famous incident Joshua Huddy was captured and hung by British Loyalists under the direction of Richard Lippincott and Colonel Tye. Colonel Tye later died from injuries sustained during that raid. Patriots later cut down Huddy's body hanging from the gallows and buried it in Freehold, at Old Tennent Church. At the end of the war, the community was deeply divided and nearly 120 loyalist families left Freehold, fearing retribution from their neighbors. Most of these families re-settled in Canada.

=== 19th century ===
During the early 1800s, Freehold steadily grew in size. The village around the courthouse was now called Freehold, along with the surrounding farmland. In 1852, when long distance railroad systems were first being developed, a railroad station, with trains making regular stops, was built running nearly parallel with Throckmorton Street in Freehold. Freehold soon had public sewers in the village and in some of the outlying farmland. By 1883, there was an electrical grid and a telephone switchboard, at a time when these inventions were still brand new. These public advancements caused rapid economic growth in Freehold. The village of Freehold became an important commercial and industrial hub in central New Jersey. The farms in the rest of Freehold benefited greatly by being able to sell their products more easily in New York and Philadelphia. The village and the farms prospered together while the public policies sought by each continued to drift apart. The municipal government became increasingly divided between villagers and farmers.

In 1824, the American Hotel opened on Main Street in Freehold. It is still standing today and is one of the oldest buildings in Freehold. In 1853, the Freehold Raceway opened. Though the original grandstand burned down in a fire, the racetrack is still open today, and is one of the oldest harness racetracks in America. The Great Fire of Freehold happened on October 30, 1873. The fire reportedly began in a commercial building on Main Street. It soon spread to engulf a large section of the village, and many wooden buildings, including Monmouth Courthouse, were burned down.

Freehold also has a relatively forgotten but important place in the history of the bicycle. Cycling champion Arthur Augustus Zimmerman resided in the town during his racing career in the 1880s and 1890s, and from 1896 to 1899 operated the Zimmerman Bicycle Co.; the company's bicycles were known as the "Zimmy." Today, Freehold Borough is home to the Metz Bicycle Museum, where the only extant "Zimmy" can be seen.

=== 20th century ===
At the beginning of the 20th century, Freehold was an increasingly divided community regarding the issue of local tax dollars used as funding for public works and infrastructure projects. The Freeholders living in the downtown area, around the courthouse had very different ideas about how to spend public money compared to the Freeholders living in the surrounding farmland. Tension within the community increased greatly in 1916 when a severe polio epidemic swept through Freehold. After contentious public debate, a referendum was held to on the future of Freehold, and voters overwhelmingly decided to split the town into two separate municipalities.

On April 15, 1919, Freehold Borough formally separated from Freehold Township. Freeholders generally refer to the different municipalities simply as the Borough and the Township. The Borough, the downtown area around the courthouse, retained all the existing government buildings around Court Street and Main Street. The Borough also kept the designation as county seat. Freehold Township, the farming communities that surrounded the courthouse, set up a new town hall complex on Schanck Road. The Township completely encircles the Borough. On September 7, 1926, Freehold Borough annexed additional territory from the Township.

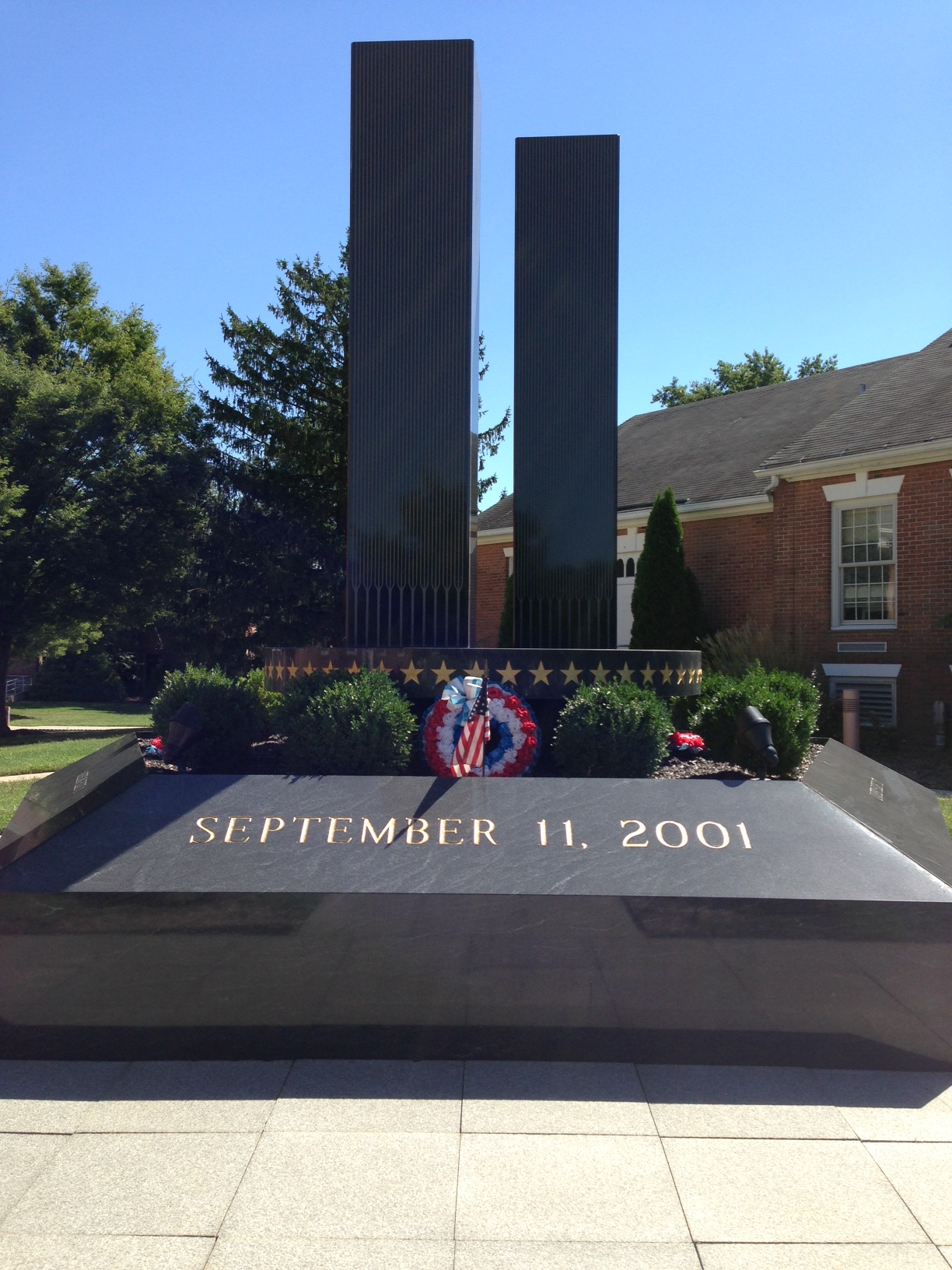
Freehold Township 911 Memorial located near Town Hall on Schanck Road

In the early 20th century, the farms in Freehold Township continued to be prosperous and successful, and the area steadily grew in population. After World War II, the township experienced rapid growth. By this time, transportation systems had increased to a point to allow workers to commute daily to jobs in larger cities, such as Newark, Philadelphia, and New York City. Highways, including U.S. Route 9 and Route 33 helped to make it possible for commuters to live in Freehold and work in nearby cities. The township quickly developed large neighborhoods of suburban single family homes.

Soon, the township began to grow commercial and industrial businesses that rivaled the borough. Brockway Glass Company built their initial facility off Center Street in 1955, which was expanded in subsequent decades before it ceased operations in 1991. The site is now operated by Iron Mountain. 3M opened a magnetic tape production facility in 1957. CentraState Medical Center, a regional hospital serving western Monmouth County, southern Middlesex County, and portions of Mercer and Ocean counties, opened in 1971 as Freehold Area Hospital.

Some industrial developments in the township were negative. In 1983, the United States Environmental Protection Agency designated the Lone Pine Chemical Site as a superfund site. The site has been called "one of the worst environmental disasters in the country". Based on the latest EPA five-year review in 2019, remediation work has contained the spill. In 1990, with the opening of Freehold Raceway Mall, the second-largest mall in the state, the township had solidified in being a premier commercial center for Central New Jersey.

As the township grew, Route 33, which ran through the heart of Freehold, became increasingly congested, in which studies suggested the construction of a new freeway. This was due to the fact that there was no room to widen the highway to 4 lanes between U.S. Route 9 and a railroad bridge at the eastern end would need to have been widened to accommodate 4 lanes. After several years, the new freeway was downsized to merely a bypass of Freehold. Construction from near Sweetmans Lane (County Route 527) to U.S. Route 9 was finished in 1972. Eventually construction began again and the bypass was extended to Halls Mill Road in 1989. For decades traffic was detoured, and congestion continued to worsen. The delay was lengthened when an endangered species was found in the path of the proposed roadway. Finally, after 32 years of waiting, the bypass was fully completed in January 2003, reducing congestion on Route 33 and Route 33 Business, albeit not a completely four-lane highway between Halls Mills Road and the Howell Road intersection.

=== 21st century ===
The township has thousands of jobs located within the municipality, along with a growing numbers of commuters who work in neighboring cities such as New York City, Newark, Trenton, and Philadelphia. Five residents died in the September 11, 2001, terrorist attack on the World Trade Center and are listed on the county's 9/11 memorial.

The COVID-19 pandemic affected Freehold Township like many communities. Early on, it (and county at large) made news for the number of reported cases. In particular, one Freehold family named the Fuscos had made news for having lost five of their relatives during the first few months of the pandemic, with 19 other family members coming into contact with the virus. In May 2020, the township adopted an ordinance to help in simplifying the process for restaurant owners to obtain permits for seasonal outdoor dining. As of June 25, 2021, the township and county has been ahead of the Biden Administration's Coronavirus vaccine goal, with at least 73.5% of adults receiving at least one dose, compared to the national average of 65.6% of adults receiving at least one dose.

== Geography ==
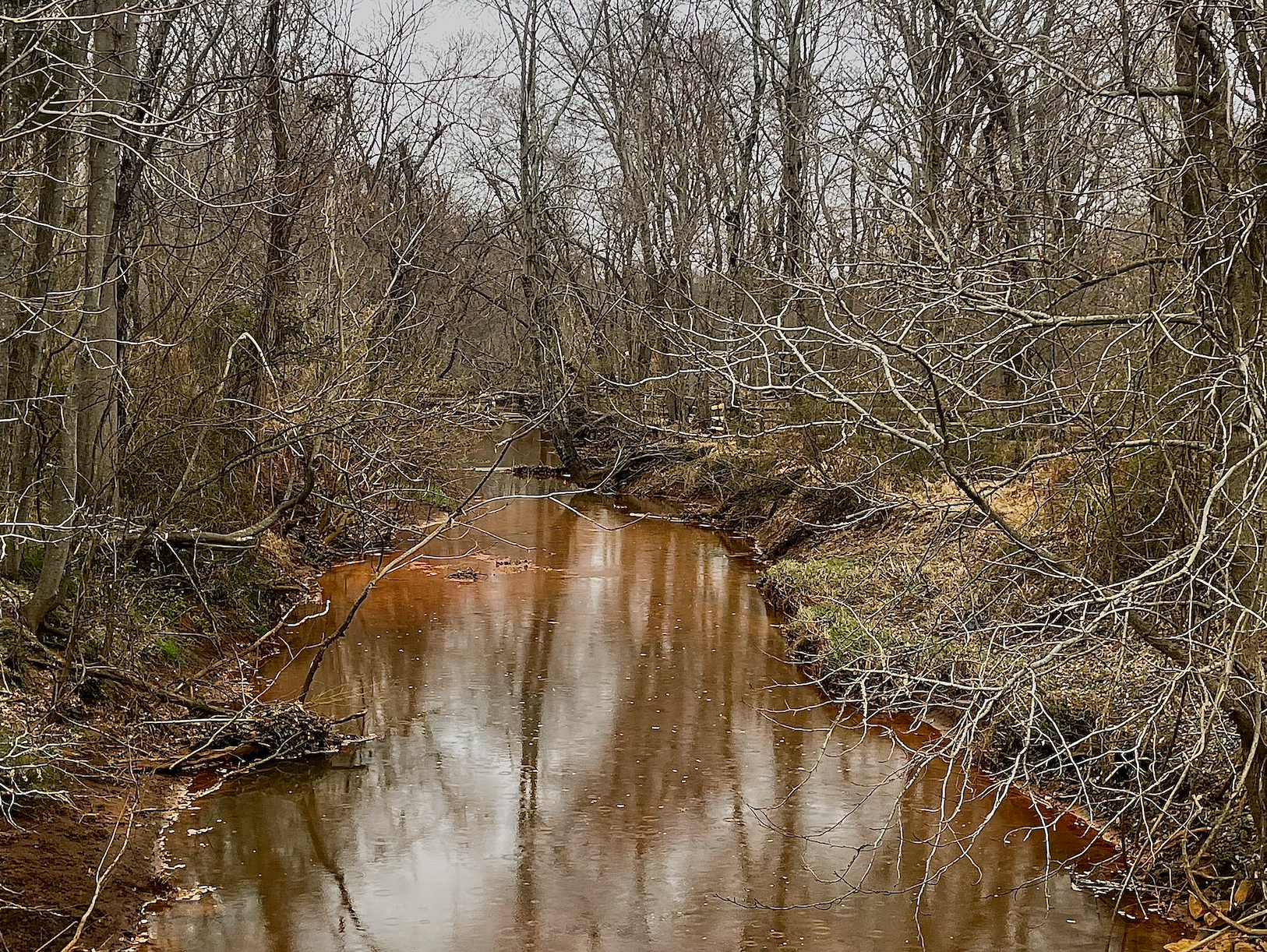
Manasquan River flows through the township

According to the United States Census Bureau, the township had a total area of 38.88 square miles (100.71 km^{2}), including 38.65 square miles (100.11 km^{2}) of land and 0.23 square miles (0.59 km^{2}) of water (0.59%).

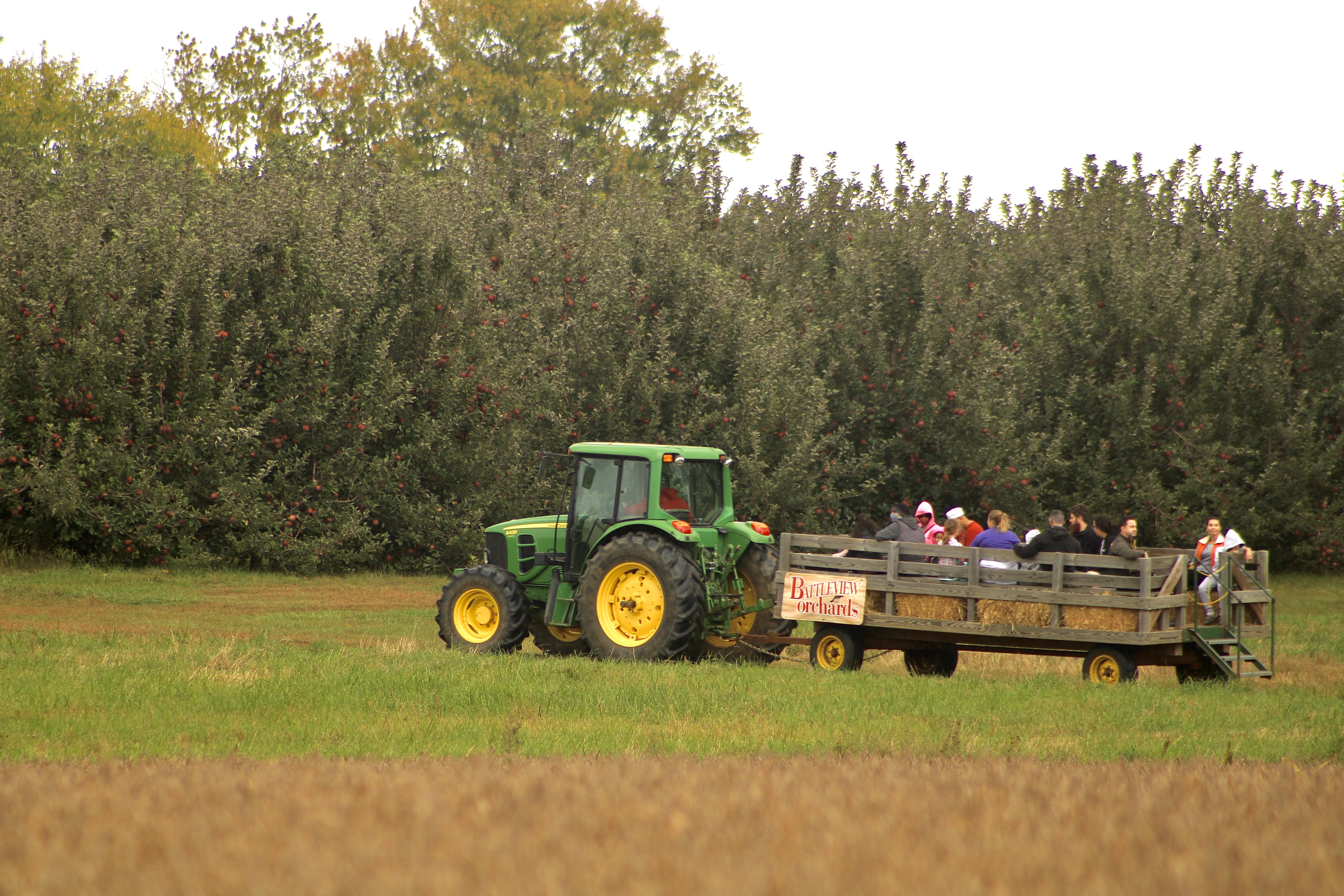
During the autumn months, hayrides and apple picking (as pictured here) are among many popular recreational activities for township residents, along with nearby residents traveling from North Jersey and New York City

The township completely surrounds the borough of Freehold, making it part of 21 pairs of "doughnut towns" in the state, where one municipality entirely surrounds another. The township borders Colts Neck, Howell, Manalapan, Marlboro and Millstone Township in Monmouth County; and Jackson in Ocean County. The municipality of Upper Freehold Township is not connected, geographically or politically, to Freehold Township.

East Freehold (2020 Census population of 4,987) and West Freehold (13,596 as of 2020) are unincorporated communities and census-designated places located within Freehold Township.

Other unincorporated communities, localities and place names located partially or completely within the township include Blue Ball (now Adelphia), Burlington Heights, Georgia, Monmouth Heights, Orchard Estates, Siloam, Smithburg, Southburg, Stonehurst East and Stonehurst West.

=== Ecology ===
According to the A. W. Kuchler U.S. potential natural vegetation types, Freehold Township would have an Appalachian oak (104) vegetation type with an Eastern hardwood forest (25) vegetation form.

=== Major bodies of water ===
Due to the township's location in New Jersey, it is the home of numerous headwaters for various important rivers, brooks, and streams that flow throughout the state. The township is located on a ridge within the geographic heartland of New Jersey, as most sections of the township fall within the hillier terrain and fertile soil found in the Inner coastal plain, while the southeastern sections of the township fall within the more flat terrain and sandier soil found in the Outer coastal plain.

Most of the township is located within the much larger Raritan Valley Region (as many of its brooks and streams flow into the aforementioned river), while also being located relatively close to the Raritan Bay. The township is also closely tied to the Jersey Shore region, being located about 16 miles (26 km) west of Asbury Park. The northernmost stretches of the Pine Barrens reach into a small section of the southern portion of the township, as it is one of only two municipalities in Monmouth County that are part of the Toms River watershed, most of which is located in Ocean County in the aforementioned Pine Barrens. Notable bodies of water within the township include:

==== Lakes ====
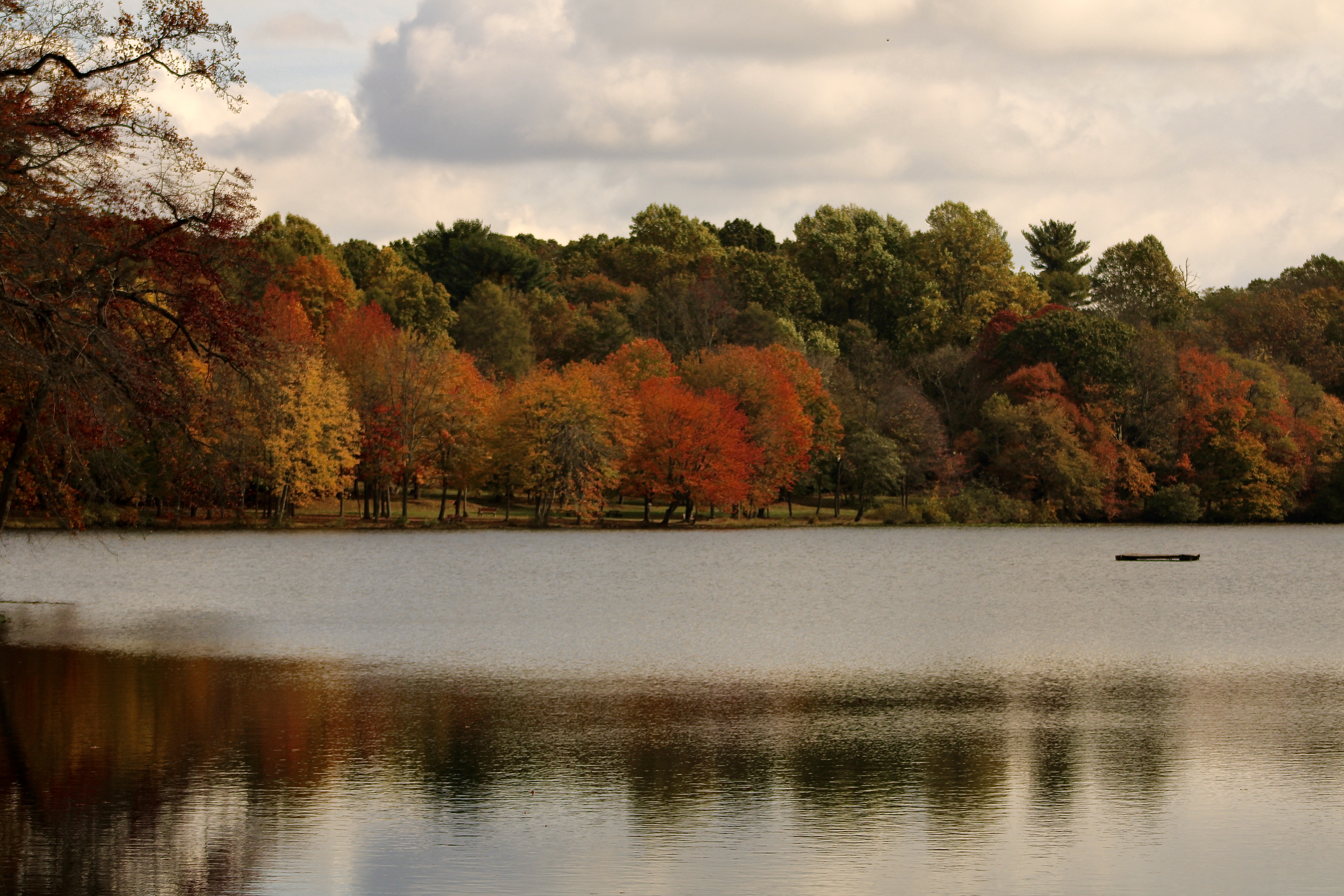
Lake Topanemus during the autumn months

- Lake Topanemus
- Turkey Swamp

==== Rivers ====
- Barnegat Bay Watershed
  - Metedeconk River
    - North Branch Metedeconk River
    - South Branch Metedeconk River
  - Toms River
- Raritan Basin Watershed
  - Manasquan River
    - Applegate Creek
    - Burkes Creek
    - Debois Creek
  - South River
    - Manalapan Brook
    - Matchaponix Brook
      - McGellairds Brook
      - Tepehemus Brook
      - Weamaconk Creek
      - Wemrock Brook
- Navesink River Watershed
  - Swimming River
    - Yellow Brook

=== Climate ===
According to the Köppen climate classification system, Freehold Township sits on the northern border between the humid subtropical climate (Cfa) zone and the humid continental climate (Dfa) zone, with the township being one of the most northern localities in North America that has a humid subtropical climate. Cfa climates are characterized by all months having an average temperature above 32.0 °F (0.0 °C), at least four months with an average temperature at or above 50.0 °F (10.0 °C), at least one month with an average temperature at or above 71.6 °F (22.0 °C) and no significant precipitation difference between seasons.

Climate data for Freehold Township, New Jersey, 1991–2020 normals, extremes 1893–present
| Month | Jan | Feb | Mar | Apr | May | Jun | Jul | Aug | Sep | Oct | Nov | Dec | Year |
|---|---|---|---|---|---|---|---|---|---|---|---|---|---|
| Record high °F (°C) | 73 (23) | 79 (26) | 87 (31) | 95 (35) | 96 (36) | 100 (38) | 106 (41) | 102 (39) | 99 (37) | 95 (35) | 83 (28) | 76 (24) | 106 (41) |
| Mean maximum °F (°C) | 63 (17) | 64 (18) | 73 (23) | 85 (29) | 89 (32) | 93 (34) | 97 (36) | 94 (34) | 91 (33) | 82 (28) | 73 (23) | 66 (19) | 98 (37) |
| Mean daily maximum °F (°C) | 41.7 (5.4) | 44.4 (6.9) | 51.4 (10.8) | 63.0 (17.2) | 72.0 (22.2) | 81.1 (27.3) | 86.5 (30.3) | 84.6 (29.2) | 78.1 (25.6) | 66.6 (19.2) | 56.2 (13.4) | 46.7 (8.2) | 64.4 (18.0) |
| Daily mean °F (°C) | 32.3 (0.2) | 34.7 (1.5) | 41.4 (5.2) | 52.1 (11.2) | 61.3 (16.3) | 70.6 (21.4) | 76.0 (24.4) | 74.0 (23.3) | 67.1 (19.5) | 55.5 (13.1) | 45.9 (7.7) | 37.4 (3.0) | 54.0 (12.2) |
| Mean daily minimum °F (°C) | 22.9 (−5.1) | 25.0 (−3.9) | 31.3 (−0.4) | 41.2 (5.1) | 50.6 (10.3) | 60.1 (15.6) | 65.5 (18.6) | 63.4 (17.4) | 56.1 (13.4) | 44.3 (6.8) | 35.7 (2.1) | 28.0 (−2.2) | 43.7 (6.5) |
| Mean minimum °F (°C) | 6 (−14) | 10 (−12) | 16 (−9) | 28 (−2) | 36 (2) | 46 (8) | 54 (12) | 54 (12) | 42 (6) | 30 (−1) | 21 (−6) | 15 (−9) | 5 (−15) |
| Record low °F (°C) | −14 (−26) | −20 (−29) | −2 (−19) | 17 (−8) | 28 (−2) | 35 (2) | 42 (6) | 41 (5) | 32 (0) | 20 (−7) | 7 (−14) | −5 (−21) | −20 (−29) |
| Average precipitation inches (mm) | 3.87 (98) | 3.10 (79) | 4.20 (107) | 3.83 (97) | 3.81 (97) | 4.44 (113) | 4.65 (118) | 4.13 (105) | 4.19 (106) | 4.13 (105) | 3.54 (90) | 4.68 (119) | 48.57 (1,234) |
| Average snowfall inches (cm) | 5.4 (14) | 6.3 (16) | 2.4 (6.1) | 0.4 (1.0) | 0 (0) | 0 (0) | 0 (0) | 0 (0) | 0 (0) | 0 (0) | trace | 4.1 (10) | 18.6 (47.1) |
| Average precipitation days (≥ 0.01 in) | 10.7 | 9.2 | 9.9 | 11.6 | 12.5 | 11.8 | 9.8 | 10.7 | 9.1 | 10.2 | 9.4 | 10.1 | 125.0 |
| Average snowy days (≥ 0.01 in) | 2 | 2 | 1 | 0 | 0 | 0 | 0 | 0 | 0 | 0 | 0 | 1 | 6 |
Source: NOAA

== Demographics ==
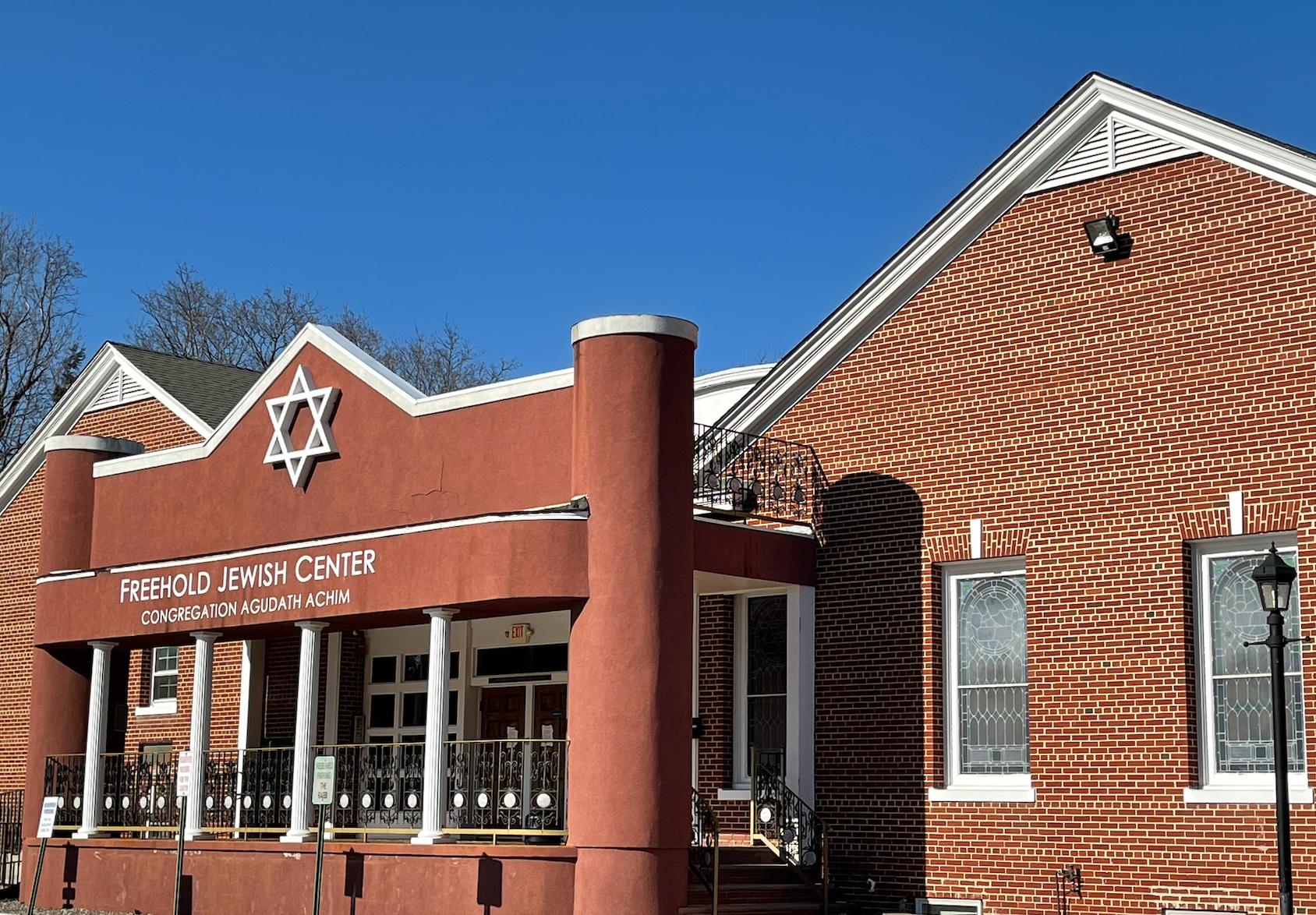
The Freehold Jewish Center serves the rapidly growing Jewish population in the Freehold vicinity.

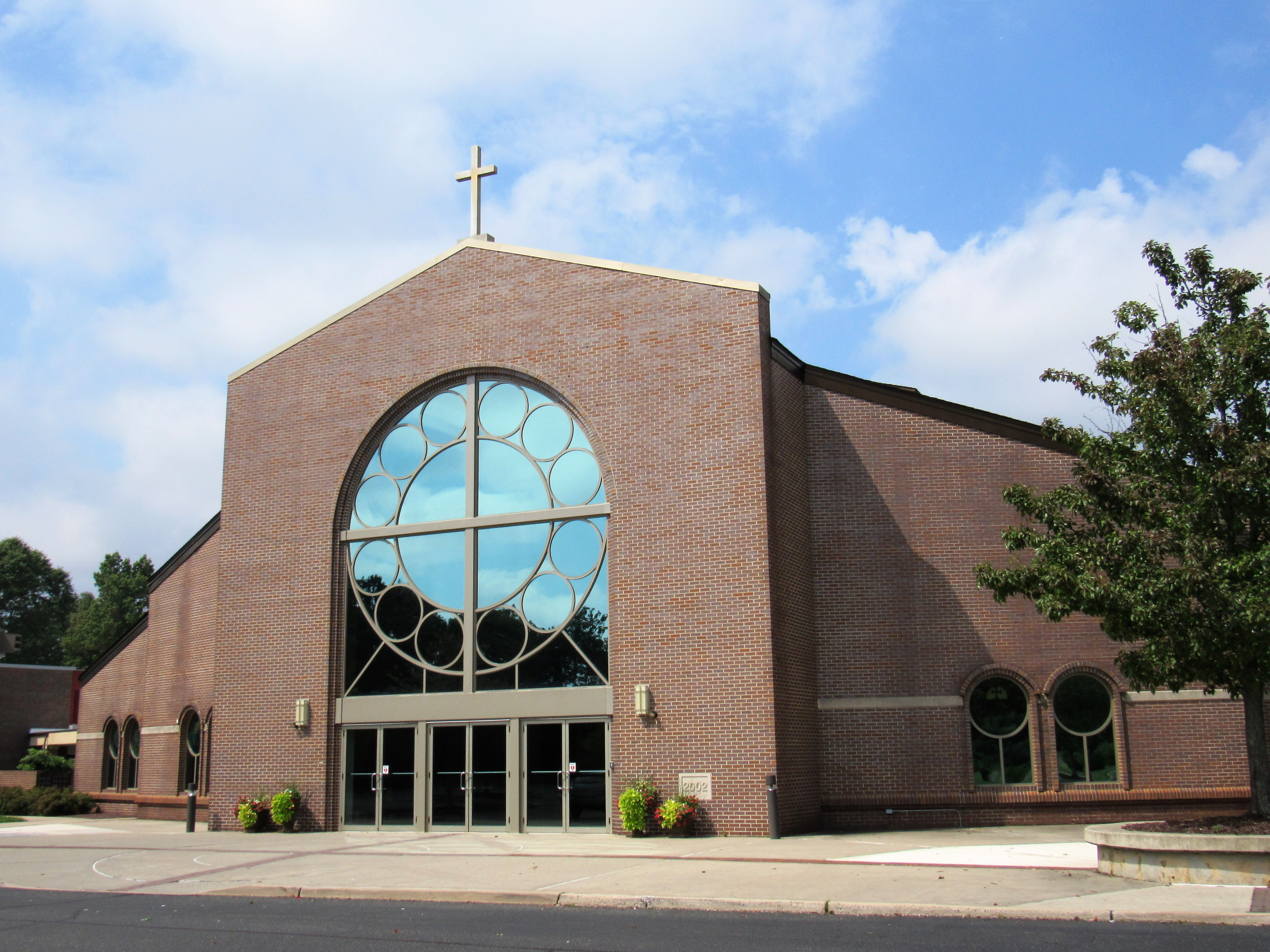
Co-Cathedral of St. Robert Bellarmine

=== 2010 census ===
The 2010 United States census counted 36,184 people, 12,577 households, and 9,382 families in the township. The population density was 939.8 per square mile (362.9/km^{2}). There were 13,140 housing units at an average density of 341.3 per square mile (131.8/km^{2}). The racial makeup was 84.32% (30,509) White, 5.34% (1,931) Black or African American, 0.13% (47) Native American, 7.03% (2,544) Asian, 0.02% (7) Pacific Islander, 1.47% (531) from other races, and 1.70% (615) from two or more races. Hispanic or Latino of any race were 7.76% (2,808) of the population.

Historical population
| Census | Pop. | Note | %± |
|---|---|---|---|
| 1790 | 3,785 | | — |
| 1810 | 4,784 | | — |
| 1820 | 5,146 | | 7.6% |
| 1830 | 5,481 | | 6.5% |
| 1840 | 6,303 | | 15.0% |
| 1850 | 2,642 | * | −58.1% |
| 1860 | 3,811 | | 44.2% |
| 1870 | 4,231 | | 11.0% |
| 1880 | 1,870 | * | −55.8% |
| 1890 | 2,165 | | 15.8% |
| 1900 | 2,234 | | 3.2% |
| 1910 | 2,329 | | 4.3% |
| 1920 | 1,498 | * | −35.7% |
| 1930 | 1,720 | | 14.8% |
| 1940 | 2,459 | | 43.0% |
| 1950 | 3,442 | | 40.0% |
| 1960 | 4,779 | | 38.8% |
| 1970 | 13,185 | | 175.9% |
| 1980 | 19,202 | | 45.6% |
| 1990 | 24,710 | | 28.7% |
| 2000 | 31,537 | | 27.6% |
| 2010 | 36,184 | | 14.7% |
| 2020 | 35,369 | | −2.3% |
| 2023 (est.) | 35,531 | | 0.5% |
Population sources: 1800–1920 1840 1850–1870; 1850 1870 1880–1890; 1890–1910 1910–1930; 1940–2000 2000; 2010 2020 * = Lost territory in previous decade.

Of the 12,577 households, 36.7% had children under the age of 18; 61.4% were married couples living together; 10.0% had a female householder with no husband present and 25.4% were non-families. Of all households, 21.7% were made up of individuals and 9.5% had someone living alone who was 65 years of age or older. The average household size was 2.75 and the average family size was 3.24.

24.3% of the population were under the age of 18, 7.5% from 18 to 24, 24.6% from 25 to 44, 30.7% from 45 to 64, and 13.0% who were 65 years of age or older. The median age was 41.3 years. For every 100 females, the population had 97.9 males. For every 100 females ages 18 and older there were 96.9 males.

The Census Bureau's 2006–2010 American Community Survey showed that (in 2010 inflation-adjusted dollars) median household income was $94,735 (with a margin of error of +/− $5,749) and the median family income was $112,094 (+/− $4,124). Males had a median income of $85,099 (+/− $6,540) versus $48,926 (+/− $4,407) for females. The per capita income for the township was $40,504 (+/− $2,006). About 2.8% of families and 3.9% of the population were below the poverty line, including 4.6% of those under age 18 and 4.0% of those age 65 or over.

=== 2000 census ===
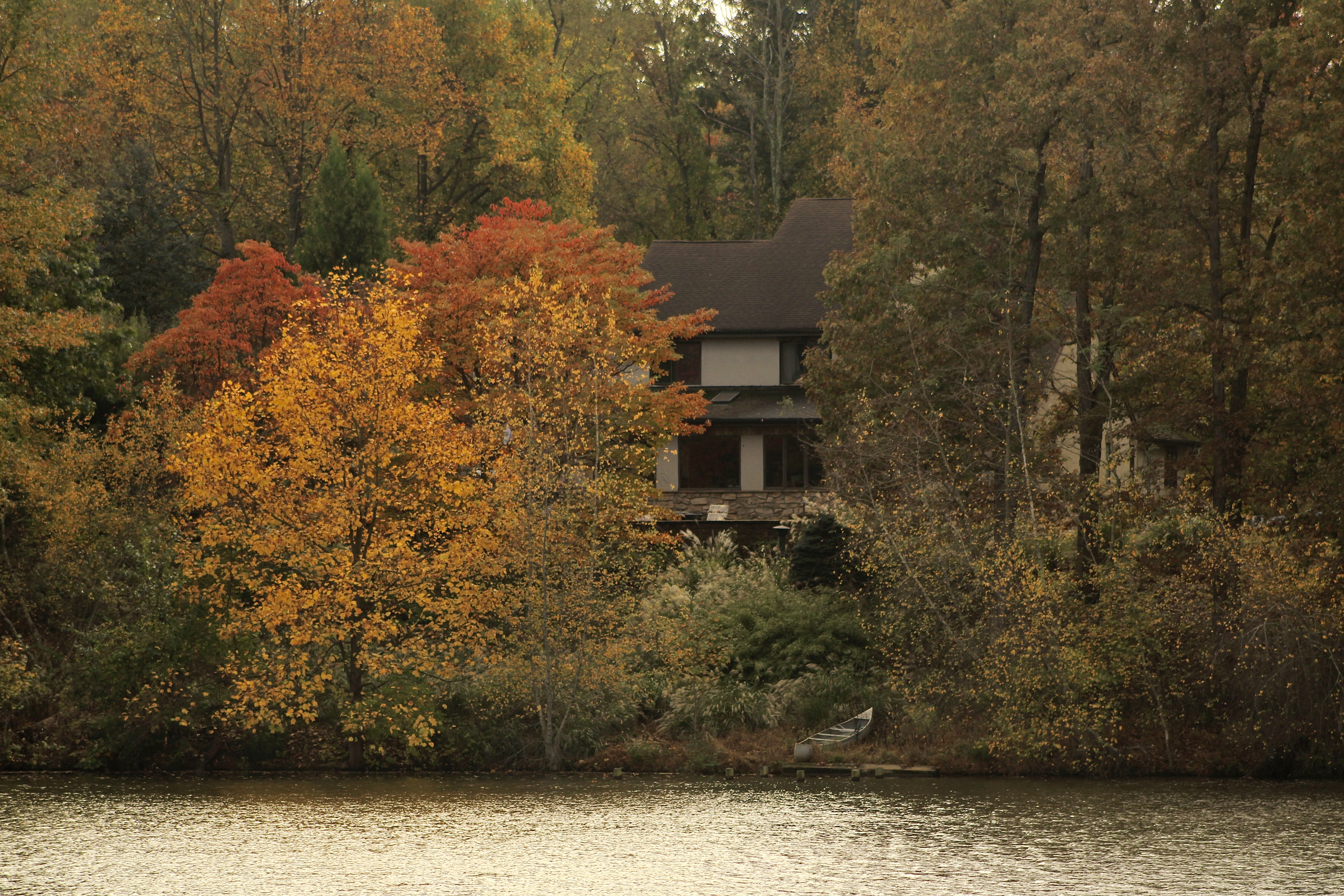
Modern home located along Lake Topanemus

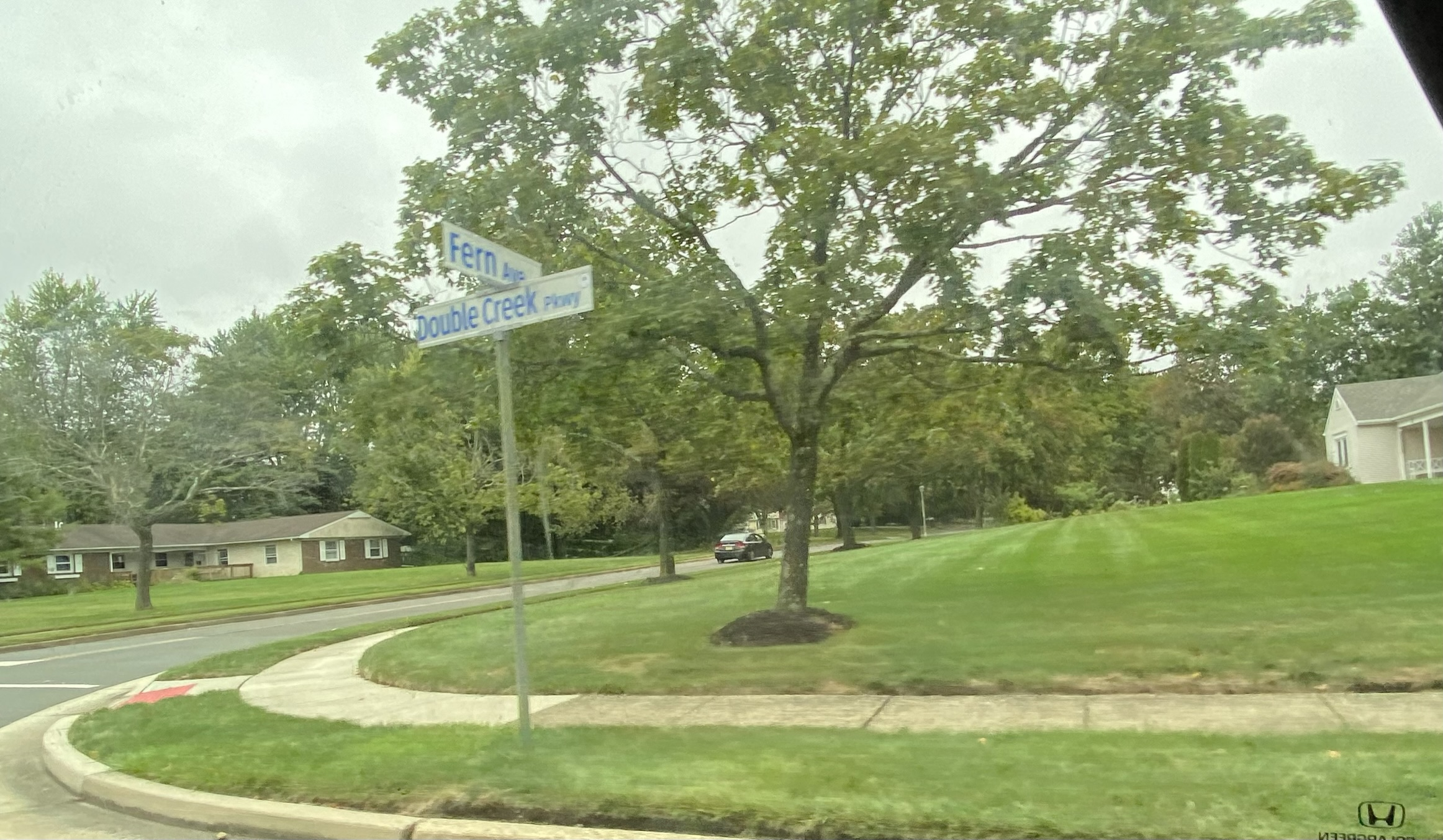
The West Freehold neighborhood. The township's residential areas range from suburban to exurban in character and density.

As of the 2000 United States census there were 31,537 people, 10,814 households, and 8,283 families residing in the township. The population density was 820.2 inhabitants per square mile (316.7/km^{2}). There were 11,032 housing units at an average density of 286.9 per square mile (110.8/km^{2}). The racial makeup of the township was 87.09% White, 5.12% African American, 0.14% Native American, 5.15% Asian, 0.02% Pacific Islander, 1.19% from other races, and 1.30% from two or more races. Hispanic or Latino of any race were 5.19% of the population.

There were 10,814 households, out of which 37.8% had children under the age of 18 living with them, 65.9% were married couples living together, 8.0% had a female householder with no husband present, and 23.4% were non-families. 20.0% of all households were made up of individuals, and 7.7% had someone living alone who was 65 years of age or older. The average household size was 2.76 and the average family size was 3.21.

In the township the population was spread out, with 25.3% under the age of 18, 6.1% from 18 to 24, 31.2% from 25 to 44, 25.5% from 45 to 64, and 12.0% who were 65 years of age or older. The median age was 38 years. For every 100 females, there were 97.7 males. For every 100 females age 18 and over, there were 95.3 males.

The median income for a household in the township was $77,185, and the median income for a family was $89,845. Males had a median income of $62,545 versus $36,668 for females. The per capita income for the township was $31,505. About 2.8% of families and 3.9% of the population were below the poverty line, including 4.8% of those under age 18 and 5.1% of those age 65 or over.

== Economy ==
Due to suburbanization within the township, its location near the Jersey Shore, along with its proximity to major cities such as New York, Newark, Trenton, and Philadelphia, the township has been a longtime economic center in the Central Jersey region.

=== Agriculture ===
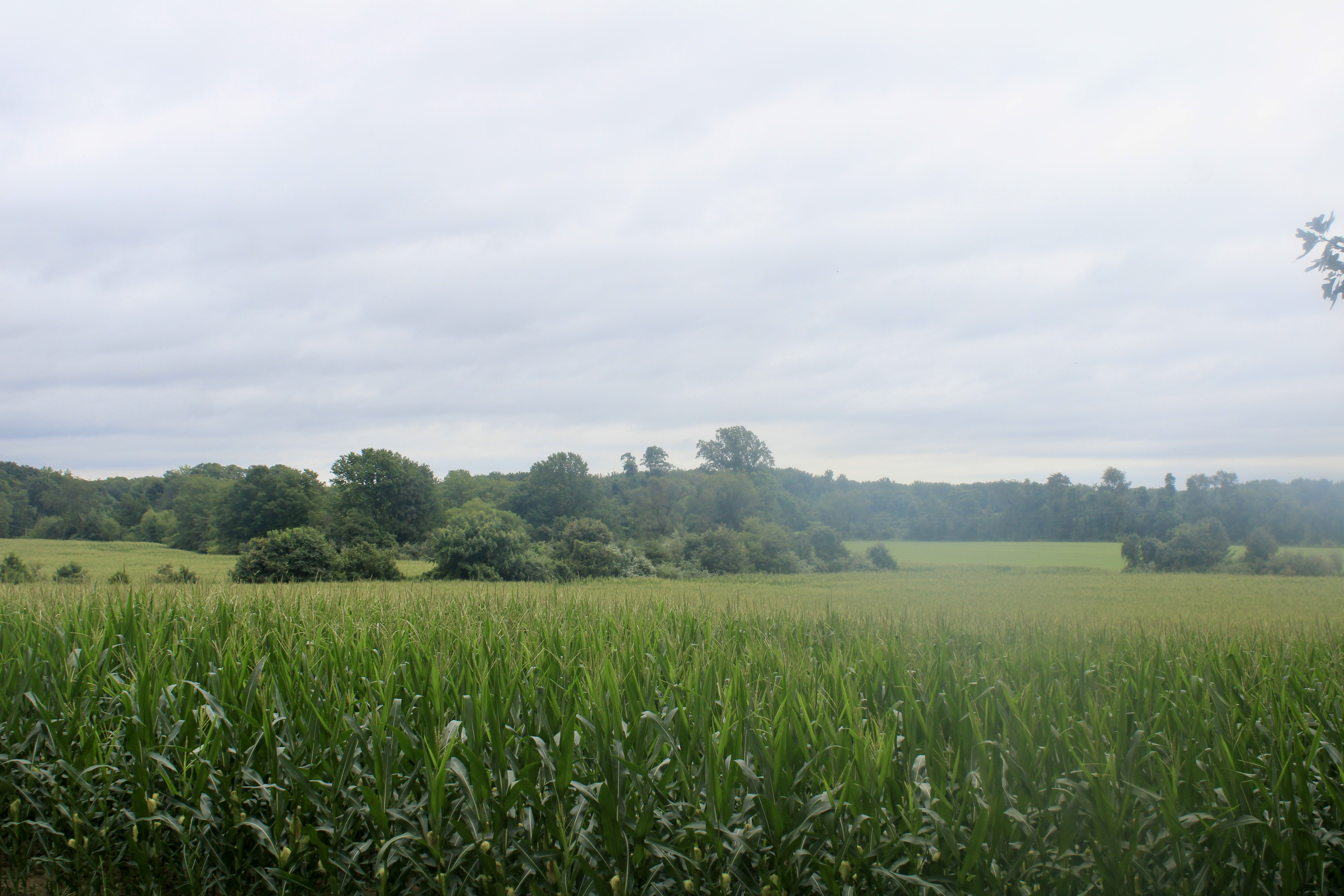
One of many crop farms in the township

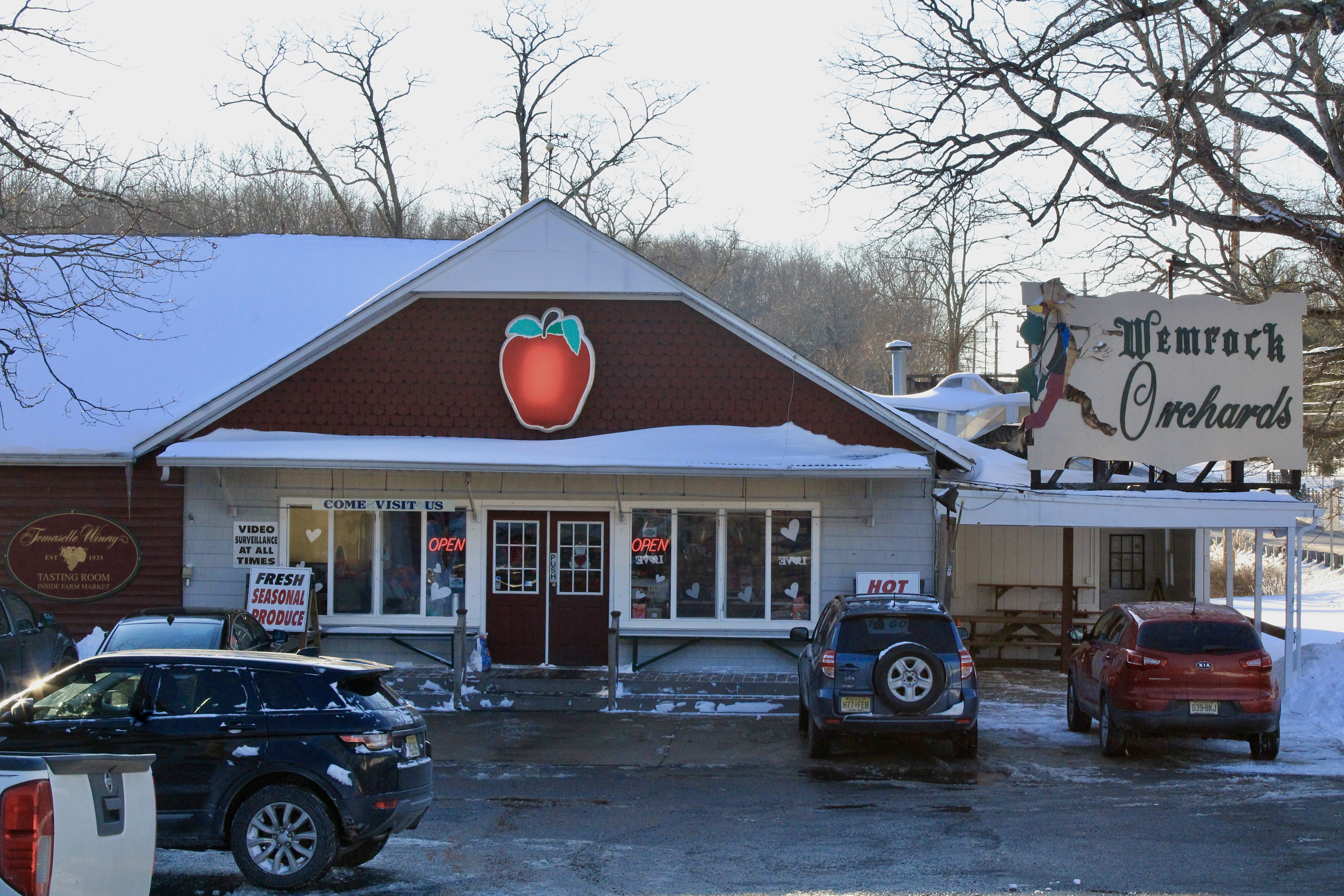
Wemrock Orchards on Route 33 Business

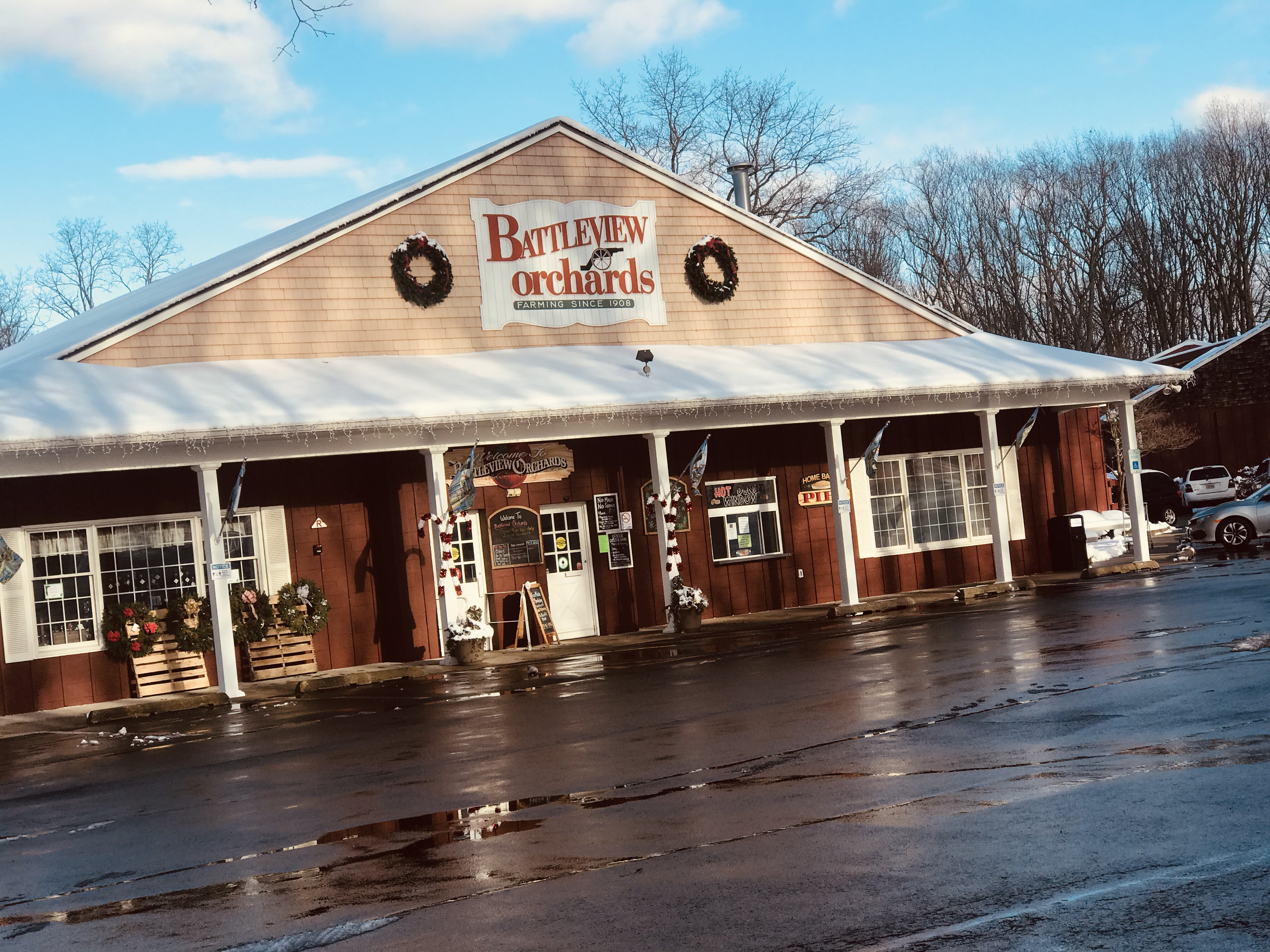
Battleview Orchards on Wemrock Road

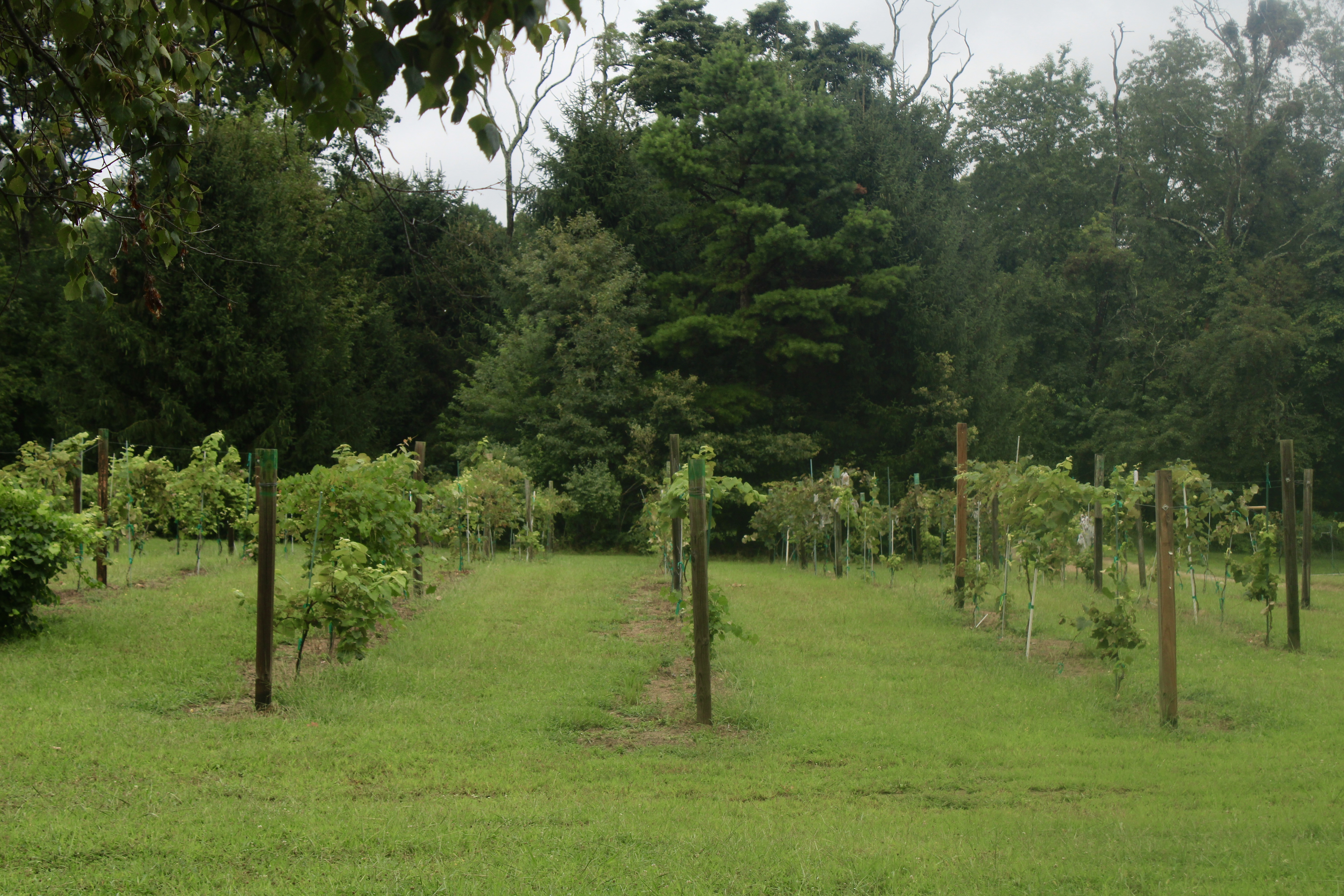
Smaller orchard on Ely Harmony Road

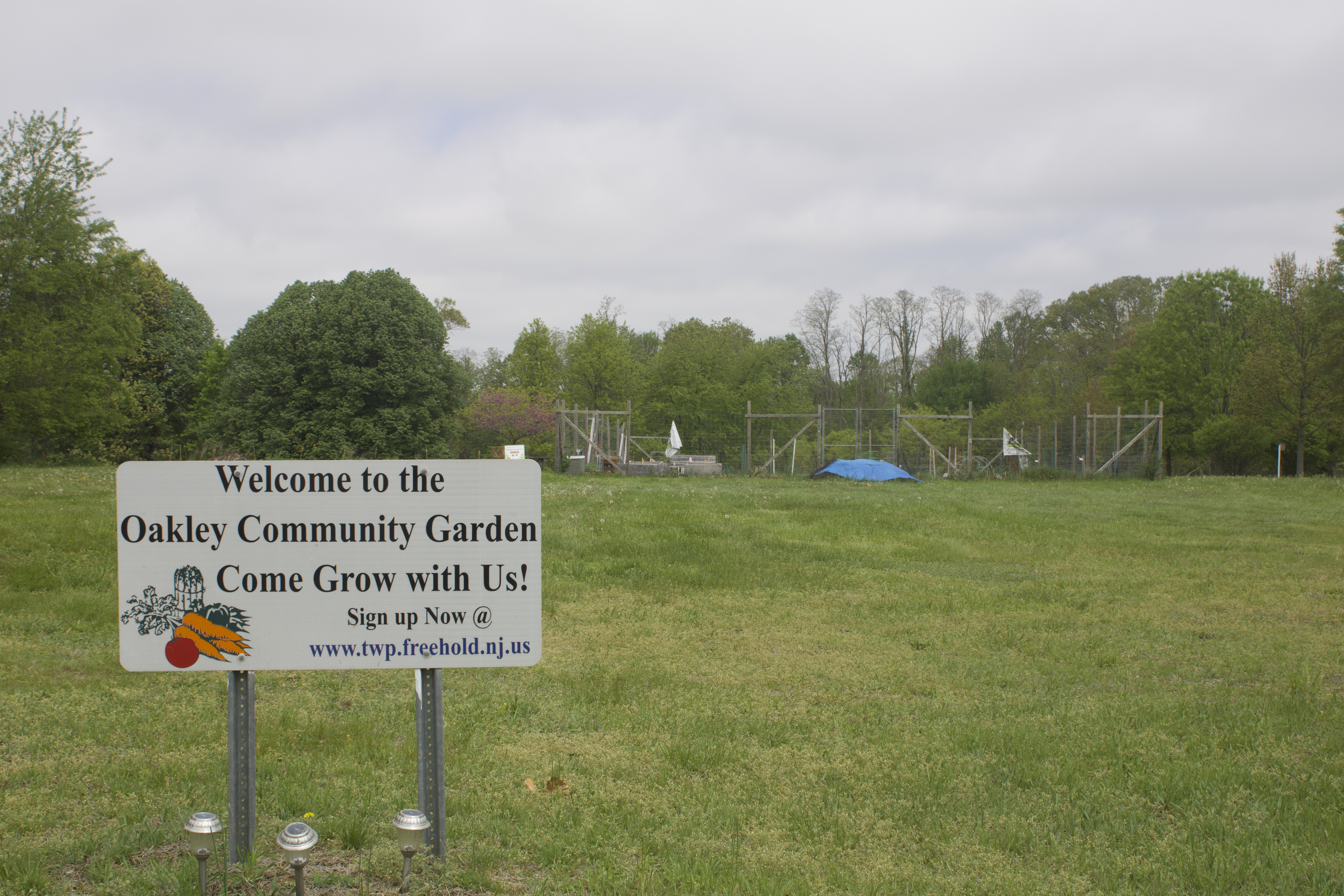
Community garden on the premises of the historic Oakley Farmstead

Despite suburbanization in recent decades, the township's agricultural roots have still been preserved. There are numerous crop farms, thoroughbred farms, sod farms, nurseries, and orchards in the township. Notable farms in the township include Brock Farms, Battleview Orchards, Clayton Family Farm, Crawford Farms, the historic Oakley Farm, Reid Sod Farm, and Wemrock Orchards.

Tomasello Winery (originally based in Hammonton) has a wine tasting room located in Wemrock Orchards.

=== Commerce ===
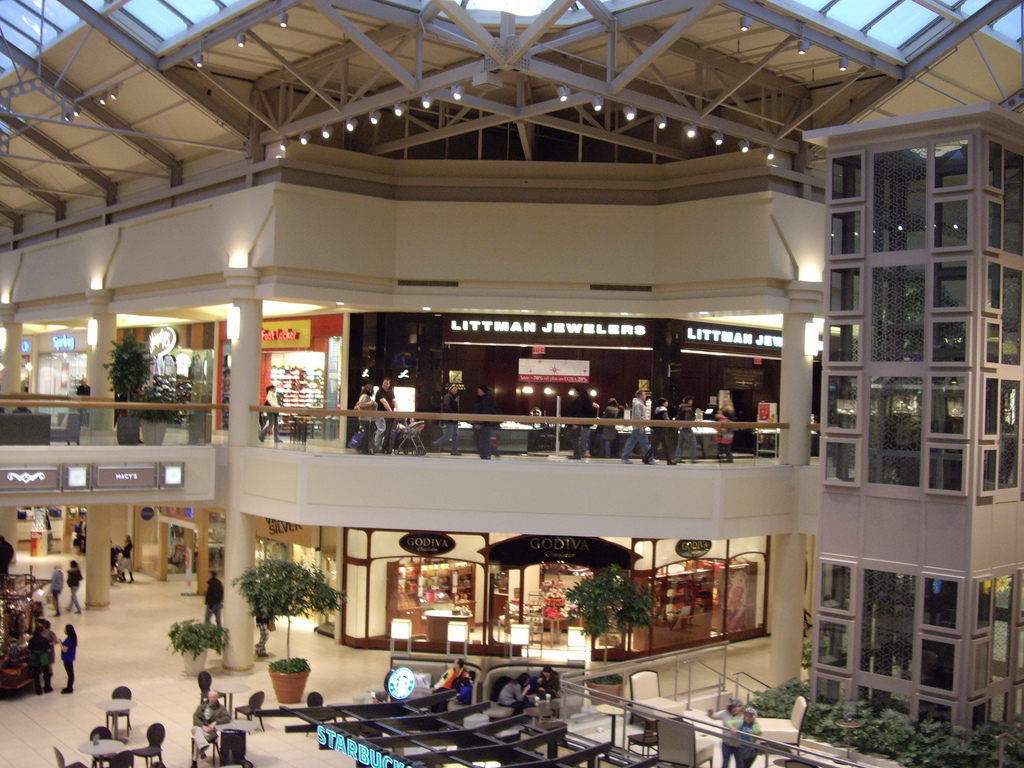
Freehold Raceway Mall

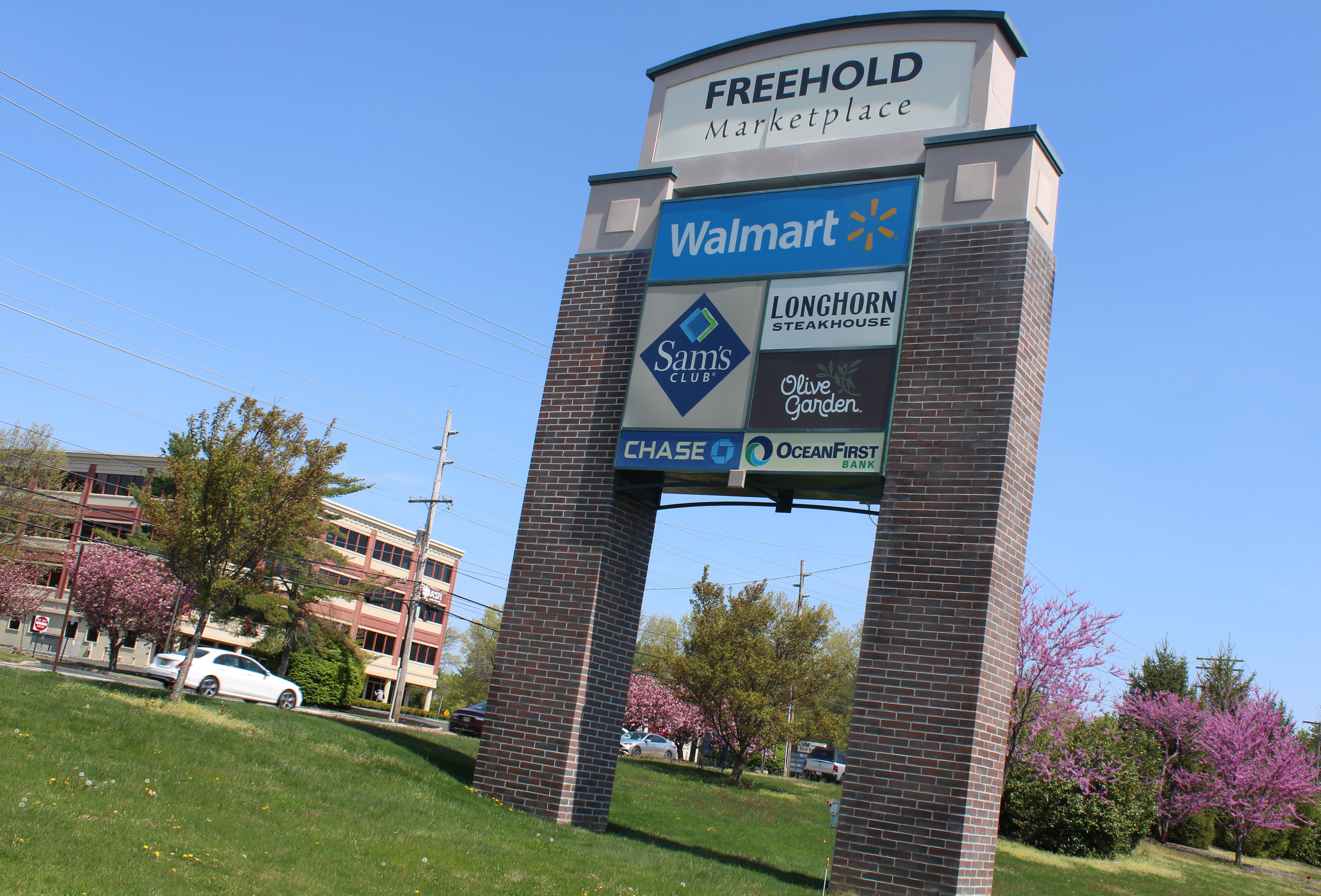
Freehold Marketplace

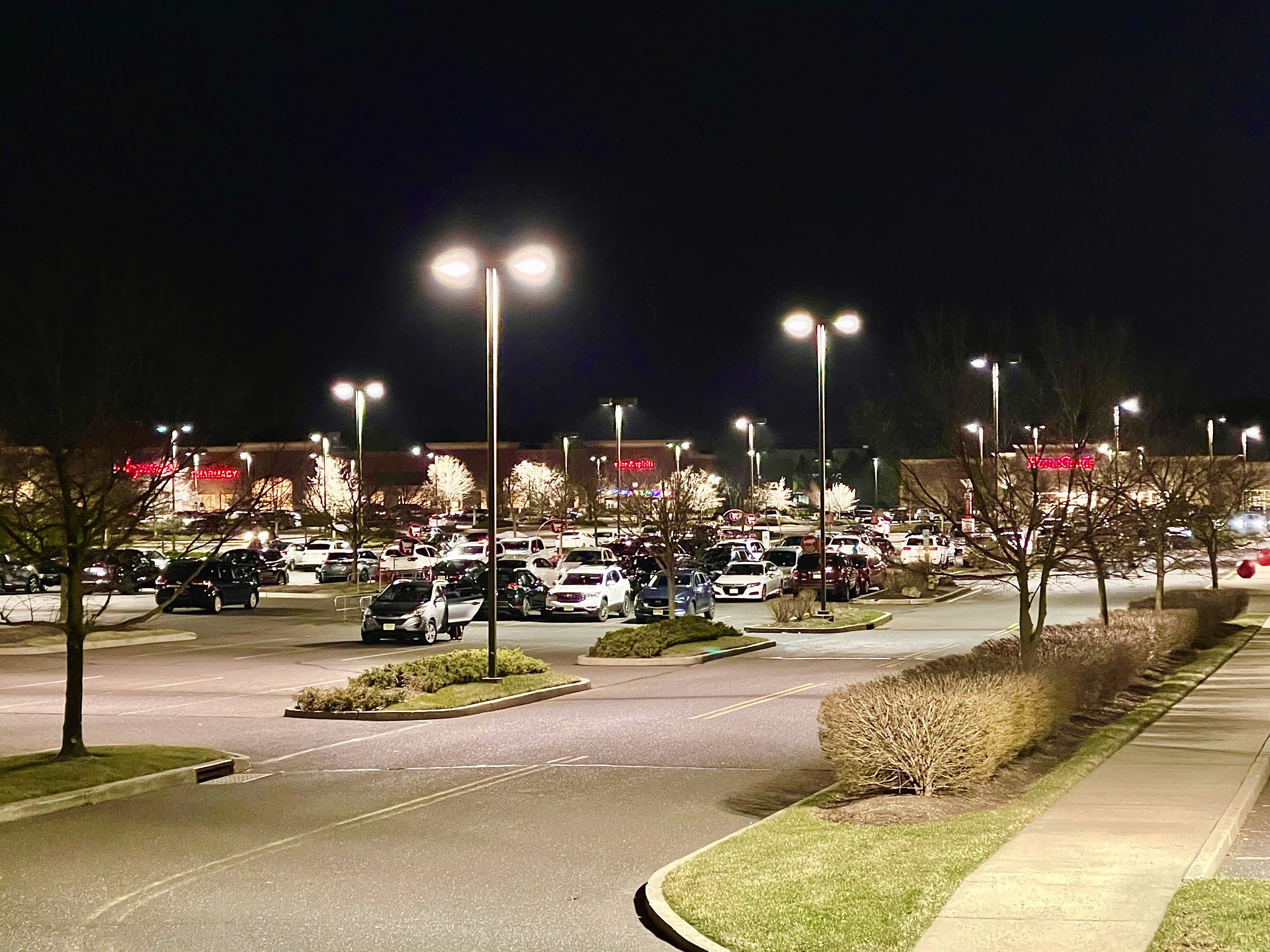
Manalapan EpiCentre at night

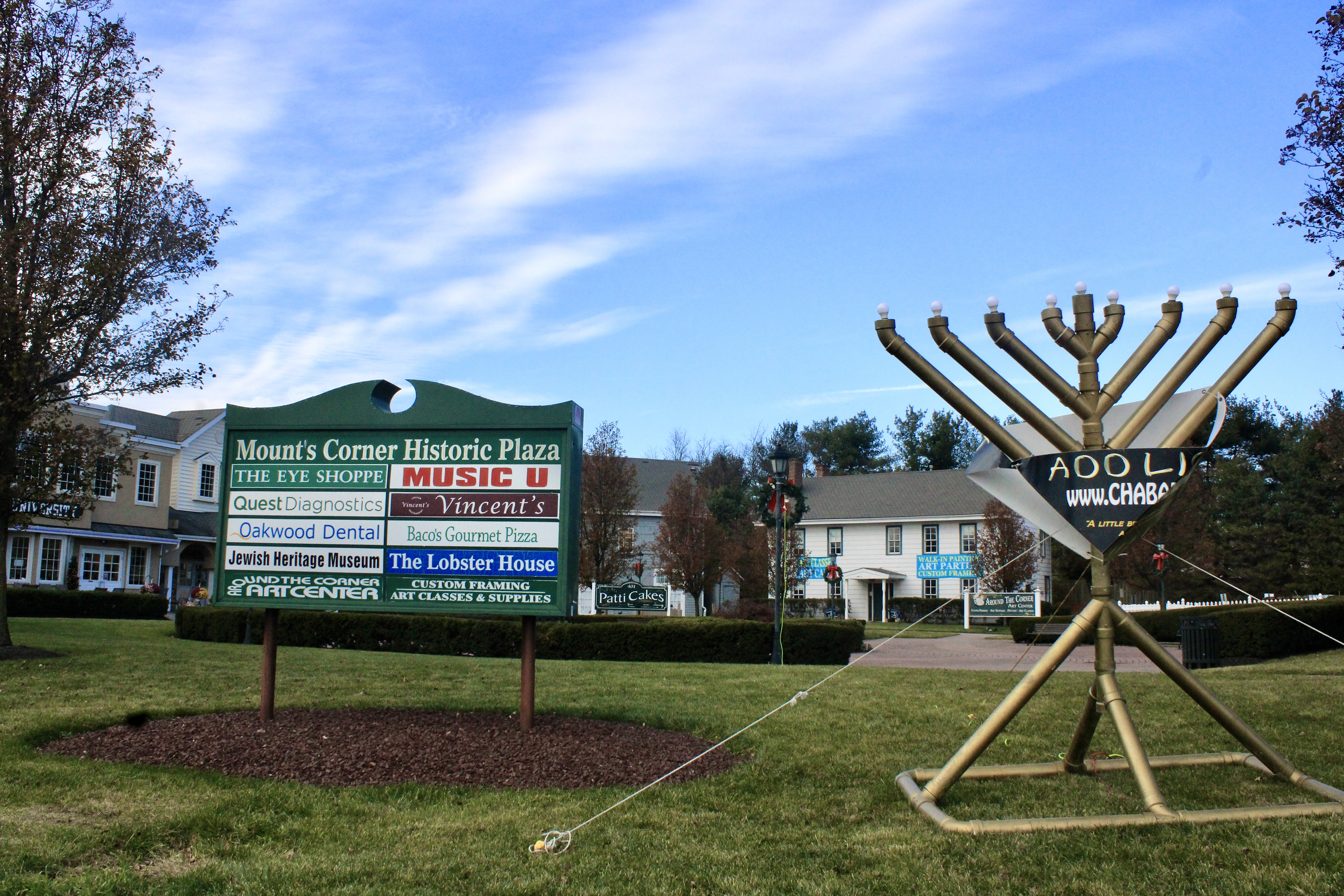
Mount's Corner Historic Shopping Plaza

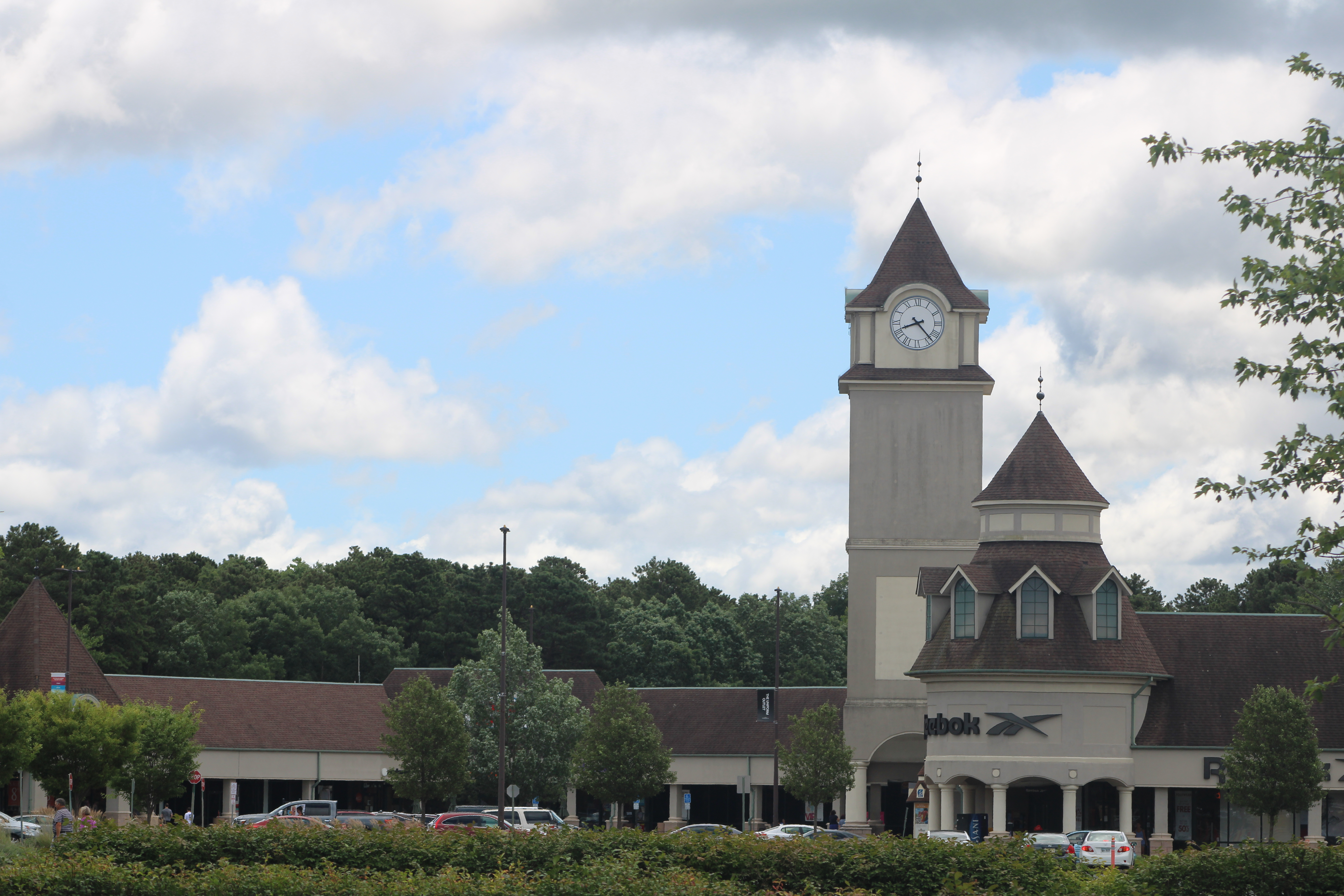
Jackson Premium Outlets at daylight

Established in 1853, making it the nation's oldest half-mile harness racing track, Freehold Raceway offers horse lovers and bettors an opportunity to see harness racing.

Completed in August 1990, the Freehold Raceway Mall was constructed at a cost of $125 million on a site covering more than 175 acres (71 ha) across from the Freehold Raceway over U.S. Route 9. A super-regional high-end shopping mall, it has a gross leasable area of 1,600,000 square feet (150,000 m^{2}), making it the third-largest mall in the state, behind Westfield Garden State Plaza and American Dream Meadowlands.

Outside of the Freehold Raceway Mall, the township itself has many other shopping malls and plazas. Diane & Co. is a dress shop that has been featured on the Oxygen Network's show Jersey Couture.

iPlay America is an indoor family entertainment and event center that opened in November 2011, offering rides, arcade and carnival games, along with Topgolf, music venues, laser tag, shops, bars, and restaurants.

==== Main Street ====
Freehold Borough (which the township surrounds) is home to Downtown Freehold, located on East and West Main Street. This downtown section has various eateries, bars, boutiques, historical sites, and other excursions. Within this section of the borough, there have been plans to revitalize the downtown area.

There are many other shopping destinations right outside of the Freeholds region, including the Manalapan EpiCentre (formerly, the Manalapan Mall) in Manalapan Township, the Jackson Premium Outlets in Jackson Township, and The Shoppes in Old Bridge Township.

=== Manufacturing ===
Freehold Township and Borough began to grow in commercial and industrial manufacturing of goods during the late 19th and early 20th centuries. Among most prominent of companies that began doing operations in the township was the Brockway Glass Company, which had built a facility on Center Street in 1955. Brockway Glass then proceeded to build additional facilities in the region in 1956, 1967, 1969 & 1976. The company ceased operations in the township in 1991, in which the site is now operated by the Freehold campus location for Iron Mountain, an enterprise information management services company.

In 1948, Nestlé opened a production plant in the borough, which handled logistics and engineering. The plant officially closed in 2023. 3M opened a magnetic tape production facility in 1957.

== Sports ==
In 2016, Freehold Township Little League 12u baseball team won the New Jersey state championship and made it to the Mid-Atlantic Regional Tournament, the first team from the township to take the state title since 2003. In 2017, Freehold Township Little League 13U baseball intermediate division won the United States Championship in the Little League Intermediate World Series tournament defeating Wailuku, Hawaii 6-4 in Livermore, California.

In 2004, the Freehold Township Senior League baseball team won the Senior League World Series. Led by manager Mike Brach of Freehold Township, the team became the first from Freehold Township to make it to the World Series, let alone win it.

== Parks and recreation ==
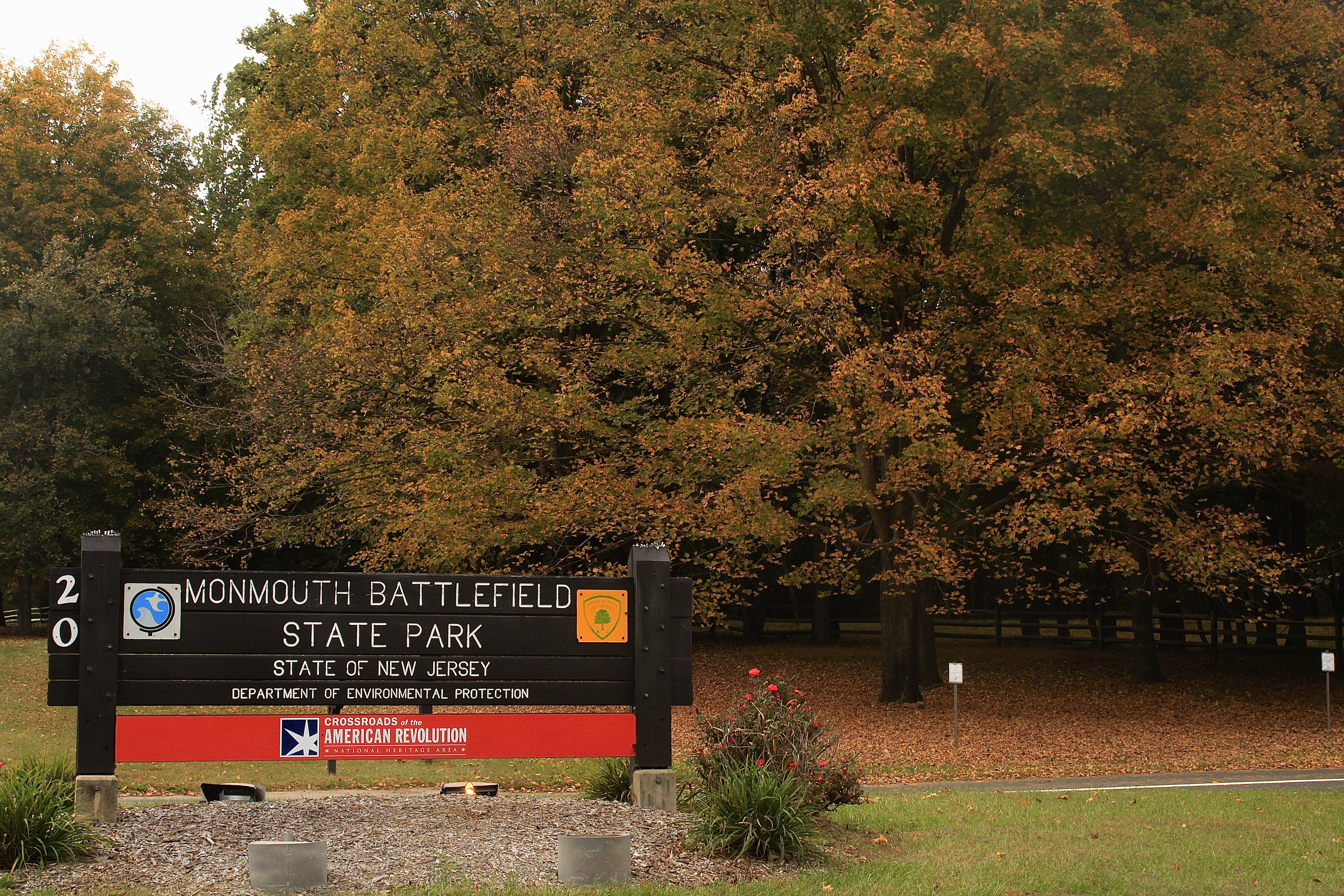
Main entrance to Monmouth Battlefield State Park

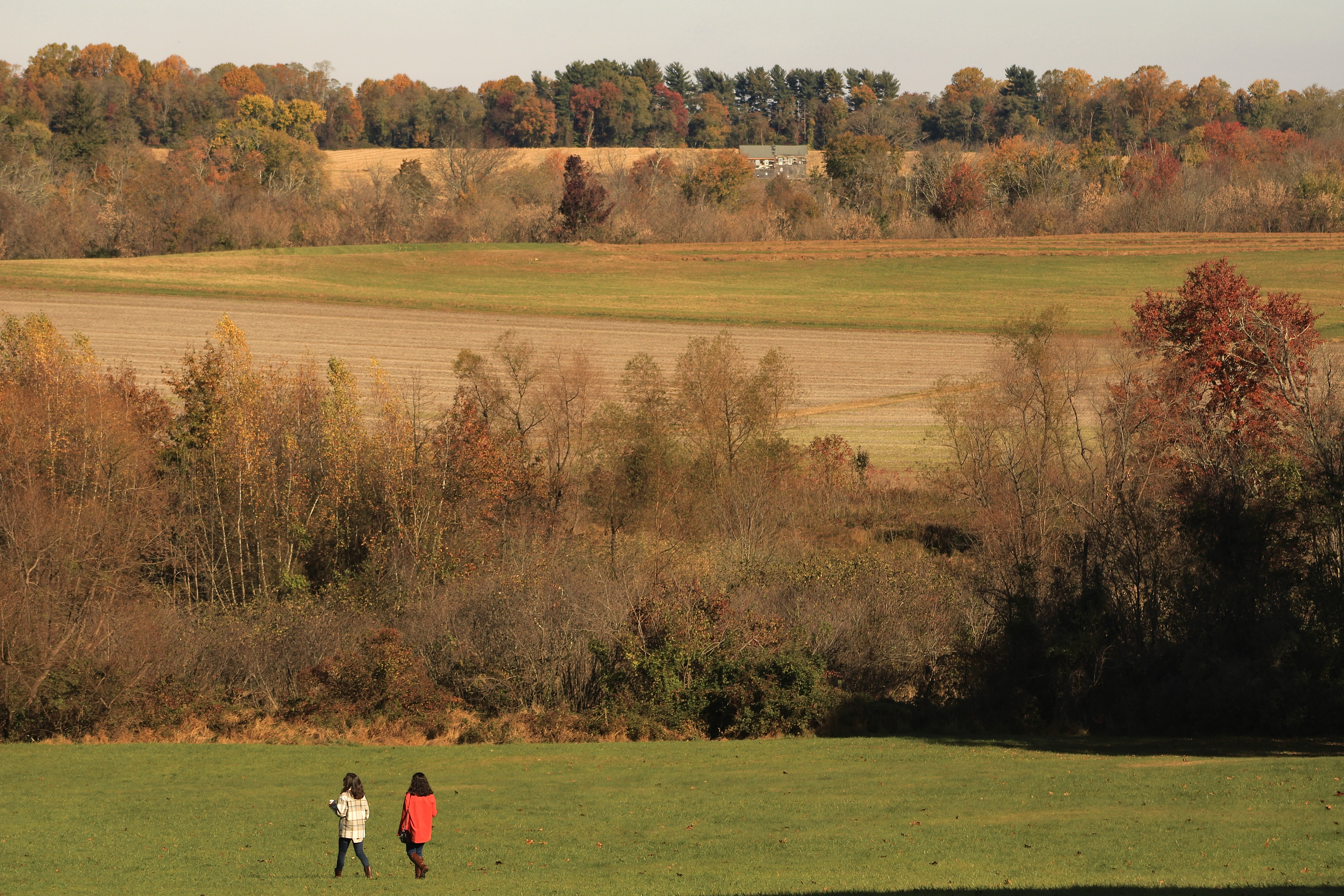
Rolling hills at Monmouth Battlefield State Park

Freehold Township is home to many parks, nature preserves, and trails. There are state, county, and municipal parks located within the township.

Monmouth Battlefield is a 1,818-acre (7.36 km^{2}) New Jersey state park. The park preserves the historic battlefield on which the American Revolutionary War's Battle of Monmouth (1778) was waged. It was added to the National Register of Historic Places for its significance in military history. The park features a vast landscape of orchards, fields, woods, and wetlands, with miles of trails for hiking and horseback riding.

Turkey Swamp Park is a 2,388-acre (966 ha) county park and nature preserve, surrounding the lake of Turkey Swamp. The park features over 9 miles (14 km) of trails, an archery range, playgrounds, soccer fields, and various picnic grounds. There are also canoes, paddleboats, kayaks, and rowboats that could be rented for usage on the lake. During the winter season the lake freezes, allowing park visitors to ice-skate on the lake as well. The park also has seasonal campgrounds, complete with laundry facilities, hot-water bathrooms, and RV electric & water hook-ups. Adjacent to the main Turkey Swamp Park, is the over 4,000-acre (1,600 ha) Turkey Swamp Wildlife Management Area, with additional miles of nature trails for hiking.

For municipal parks in the township, they are managed by the Freehold Township: Parks and Recreation Commission. The commission's responsibilities include the formulating of plans for the development, improvement, maintenance and use of township-owned public park and playground lands. Regular Meetings are held 7:00 pm, the 4th Wednesday of every month at Michael J. Tighe Park. The commission manages all programs associated with Freehold Township Parks. There are numerous sports programs, such as for Basketball, Golf, Track & Field, Cross Country, and Lacrosse. The commission manages the annual Summer Camp program for the township (located at Michael J. Tighe Park), available for all children township residents. The commission also manages the township's Skate Park.

Freehold Township Online Registration Portal

Michael J. Tighe Park is the largest municipal park for the township. The park is located off of Georgia Road and provides a wide assortment of recreational opportunities. Michael J. Tighe Park was formerly known as Liberty Oak Park, with the park having been renamed in 2001 to honor the former township recreation commissioner Michael J. Tighe. Other municipal parks in the township include Durand Park, Whittier Oaks Park, Opatut Park, Wynnefield Park, Stonehurst Park, Sandy Brook Park, Duchess Court Park, Greentree Park, Medford Park, Woodgate Park, Woodcrest Park, Orchard Hills Park and Sargent Park.

Lake Topanemus is a 71-acre (29 ha) suburban park located in the township, but is owned and operated by neighboring Freehold Borough. The park's lake was the original site of a mill in the 1800s. The park is popular for freshwater fishing, paddle boating, and canoeing on the lake, along with its picturesque nature trails, playgrounds, outdoor calisthenics, and open fields. The park's more than 4 miles (6.4 km) of crushed stone trails are shared by runners, walkers, and bikers. The park is used as a 5K running course shared by cross country runners from Freehold Boro High School.

The southernmost segment of the Henry Hudson Trail starts in Freehold Borough and runs northeast through the township, to the Raritan Bayshore region. The parking area in the township is located at 119 Dutch Lane Road and is used by walkers, runners and bicyclists.

== Government ==
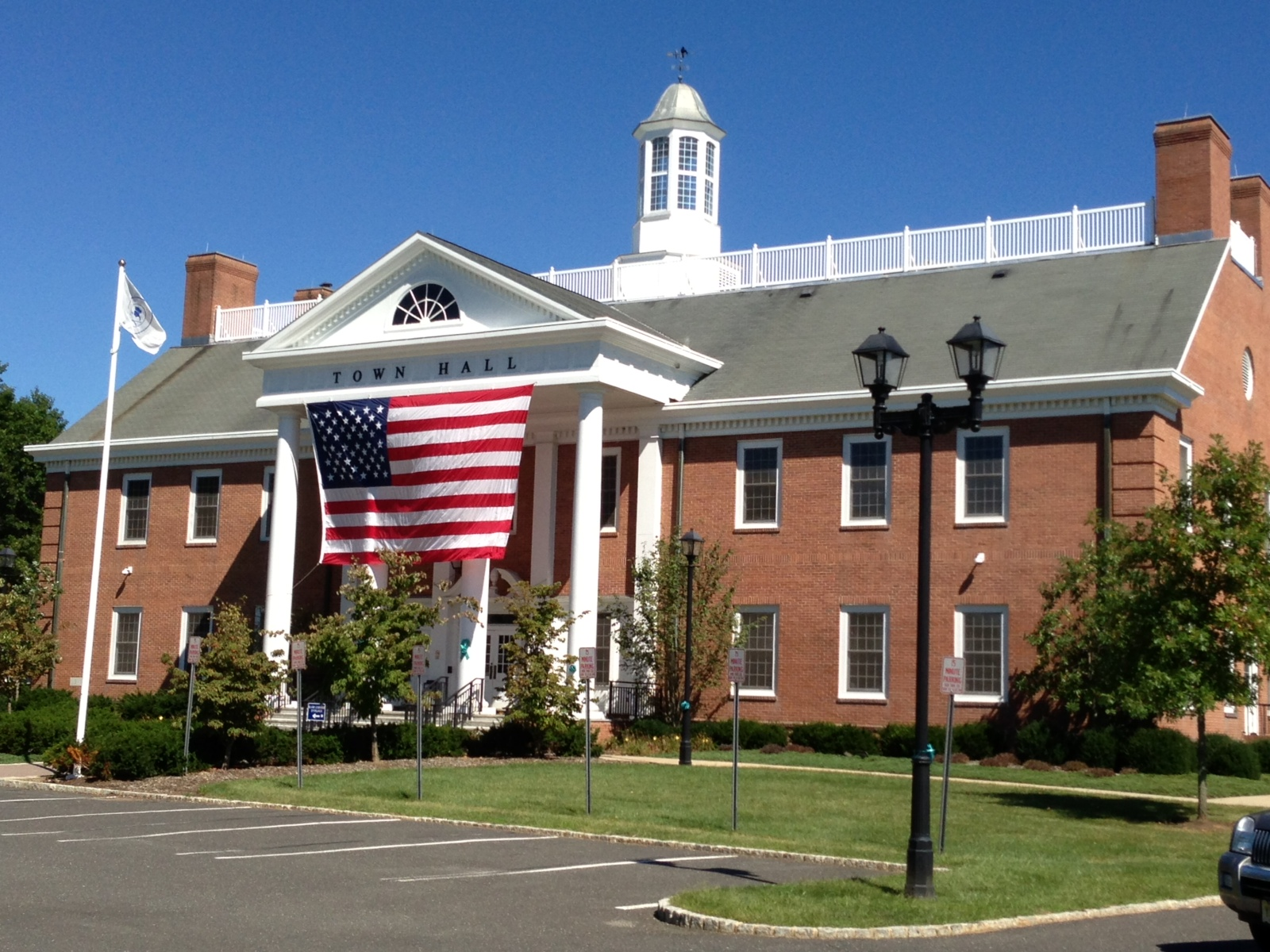
Town Hall in Freehold Township, located on Schanck Road

=== Local ===
Freehold Township is governed under the Township form of New Jersey municipal government, one of 141 municipalities (of the 564) statewide that use this form, the second-most commonly used form of government in the state. The Township Committee is comprised of five members, who are elected directly by the voters at-large in partisan elections to serve three-year terms of office on a staggered basis, with either one or two seats coming up for election each year as part of the November general election in a three-year cycle. At an annual reorganization meeting, the Township Committee selects one of its members to serve as Mayor and another as Deputy Mayor.

The Township Committee enacts local ordinances, levies municipal taxes and conducts the affairs of the township. In almost all cases, it can review and approve the actions of other Freehold Township boards, committees and agencies. The Township Committee conducts all of its business during monthly meetings open to the public.

As of 2025, the members of the Township Committee are Mayor Maureen Fasano (R, term on committee and as mayor ends December 31, 2025), Deputy Mayor Lester A. Preston Jr. (R, term on committee ends 2026; term as deputy mayor ends 2025), Anthony J. Ammiano (R, 2027), Thomas L. Cook (R, 2027) and Alan C. Walker (R, 2026).

In January 2020, the Township Committee appointed Alan C. Walker to fill the seat expiring in December 2020 that had become vacant following the resignation of David M. Salkin.

=== Federal, state, and county ===
Freehold Township is located in the 3rd and 4th Congressional Districts and is part of New Jersey's 11th state legislative district.

For the 119th United States Congress, New Jersey's 3rd congressional district is currently represented Herb Conaway (D, Delran Township). For the 119th United States Congress, New Jersey's 4th congressional district is represented by Chris Smith (R, Manchester Township). New Jersey is represented in the United States Senate by Democrats Cory Booker (Newark, term ends 2027) and Andy Kim (Moorestown, term ends 2031).

For the 2026–2027 session, the 11th legislative district of the New Jersey Legislature is represented in the New Jersey Senate by Vin Gopal (D, Long Branch) and in the General Assembly by Margie Donlon (D, Ocean Township) and Luanne Peterpaul (D, Long Branch).

Monmouth County is governed by a Board of County Commissioners composed of five members who are elected at-large to serve three-year terms of office on a staggered basis, with either one or two seats up for election each year as part of the November general election. At an annual reorganization meeting held in the beginning of January, the board selects one of its members to serve as director and another as deputy director.

As of 2026, Monmouth County's Commissioners are Director Thomas A. Arnone (R, Neptune City, 2028),Deputy Director Nick DiRocco (R, Wall Township, 2028), Susan M. Kiley (R, Hazlet Township, 2027), Erik Anderson (R, Shrewsbury, 2026), and Ross F. Licitra (R, Marlboro Township, 2026).

Constitutional officers elected on a countywide basis are Clerk Christine Giordano Hanlon (R, 2030; Ocean Township), Sheriff Shaun Golden (R, 2028; Howell Township) and Surrogate Maureen Raisch (R, 2026; Middletown Township).

=== Politics ===
United States presidential election results for Freehold Township
| Year | Republican | | Democratic | | Third party(ies) | |
| Year | No. | % | No. | % | No. | % |
|---|---|---|---|---|---|---|
| 2024 | 12,031 | 58.14% | 8,312 | 40.17% | 351 | 1.70% |
| 2020 | 11,618 | 53.63% | 9,791 | 45.20% | 253 | 1.17% |
| 2016 | 9,972 | 55.58% | 7,410 | 41.30% | 560 | 3.12% |
| 2012 | 9,204 | 55.32% | 7,242 | 43.53% | 192 | 1.15% |
| 2008 | 9,480 | 54.14% | 7,845 | 44.80% | 185 | 1.06% |
| 2004 | 9,260 | 56.79% | 6,915 | 42.41% | 131 | 0.80% |
| 2000 | 6,534 | 47.46% | 6,794 | 49.35% | 440 | 3.20% |
| 1996 | 4,963 | 41.54% | 5,900 | 49.38% | 1,085 | 9.08% |
| 1992 | 5,360 | 45.38% | 4,423 | 37.45% | 2,028 | 17.17% |

As of March 23, 2011, there were a total of 23,033 registered voters in Freehold Township, of which 5,014 (21.8%) were registered as Democrats, 5,058 (22.0%) were registered as Republicans and 12,949 (56.2%) were registered as Unaffiliated. There were 12 voters registered as Libertarians or Greens.

In the 2016 presidential election, Republican Donald Trump received 55.6% of the vote (9,972 cast), ahead of Democrat Hillary Clinton with 41.3% (7,410 votes), and other candidates with 3.1% (560 votes), among the 17,942 ballots cast by the township's voters. In the 2012 presidential election, Republican Mitt Romney received 55.3% of the vote (9,204 cast), ahead of Democrat Barack Obama with 43.5% (7,242 votes), and other candidates with 1.2% (192 votes), among the 16,715 ballots cast by the township's 23,974 registered voters (77 ballots were spoiled), for a turnout of 69.7%. In the 2008 presidential election, Republican John McCain received 53.5% of the vote (9,480 cast), ahead of Democrat Barack Obama with 44.2% (7,845 votes) and other candidates with 1.0% (185 votes), among the 17,733 ballots cast by the township's 23,935 registered voters, for a turnout of 74.1%. In the 2004 presidential election, Republican George W. Bush received 56.6% of the vote (9,260 ballots cast), outpolling Democrat John Kerry with 42.2% (6,915 votes) and other candidates with 0.6% (131 votes), among the 16,373 ballots cast by the township's 22,061 registered voters, for a turnout percentage of 74.2.

Gubernatorial election results for Freehold Township
| Year | Republican | | Democratic | | Third party(ies) | |
| Year | No. | % | No. | % | No. | % |
|---|---|---|---|---|---|---|
| 2025 | 9,213 | 56.62% | 6,985 | 42.93% | 73 | 0.45% |
| 2021 | 8,491 | 61.18% | 5,291 | 38.13% | 96 | 0.69% |
| 2017 | 6,060 | 57.71% | 4,246 | 40.43% | 195 | 1.86% |
| 2013 | 7,009 | 72.19% | 2,525 | 26.01% | 175 | 1.80% |
| 2009 | 7,900 | 65.83% | 3,317 | 27.64% | 784 | 6.53% |
| 2005 | 5,562 | 54.18% | 4,227 | 41.17% | 477 | 4.65% |

In the 2017 gubernatorial election, Republican Kim Guadagno received 57.7% of the vote (6,060 cast), ahead of Democrat Phil Murphy with 40.4% (4,246 votes). In the 2013 gubernatorial election, Republican Chris Christie received 72.2% of the vote (7,009 cast), ahead of Democrat Barbara Buono with 26.0% (2,525 votes), and other candidates with 1.8% (175 votes), among the 9,826 ballots cast by the township's 24,098 registered voters (117 ballots were spoiled), for a turnout of 40.8%. In the 2009 gubernatorial election, Republican Chris Christie received 65.5% of the vote (7,900 ballots cast), ahead of Democrat Jon Corzine with 27.5% (3,317 votes), Independent Chris Daggett with 5.7% (688 votes) and other candidates with 0.8% (96 votes), among the 12,058 ballots cast by the township's 23,343 registered voters, yielding a 51.7% turnout.

United States Senate election results for Freehold Township1
| Year | Republican | | Democratic | | Third party(ies) | |
| Year | No. | % | No. | % | No. | % |
|---|---|---|---|---|---|---|
| 2024 | 11,240 | 56.34% | 8,327 | 41.74% | 382 | 1.91% |
| 2018 | 8,108 | 57.26% | 5,616 | 39.66% | 435 | 3.07% |
| 2012 | 8,818 | 55.87% | 6,721 | 42.58% | 244 | 1.55% |
| 2006 | 5,162 | 54.26% | 4,072 | 42.80% | 279 | 2.93% |

United States Senate election results for Freehold Township2
| Year | Republican | | Democratic | | Third party(ies) | |
| Year | No. | % | No. | % | No. | % |
|---|---|---|---|---|---|---|
| 2020 | 11,539 | 54.21% | 9,375 | 44.05% | 371 | 1.74% |
| 2014 | 4,619 | 57.02% | 3,341 | 41.24% | 141 | 1.74% |
| 2013 | 3,532 | 57.13% | 2,581 | 41.75% | 69 | 1.12% |
| 2008 | 9,237 | 56.28% | 6,791 | 41.38% | 385 | 2.35% |

== Education ==
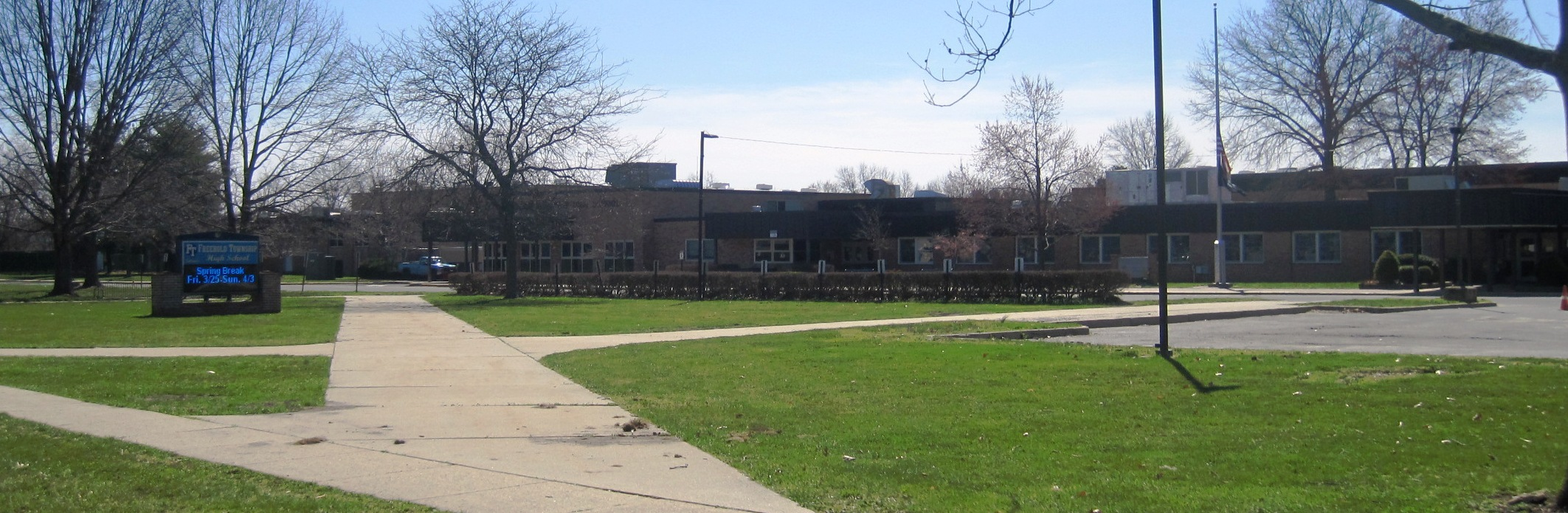
Freehold Township High School located on Elton-Adelphia Road

Public school students in pre-kindergarten through eighth grade are educated by the Freehold Township Schools. As of the 2022–23 school year, the district, comprised of eight schools, had an enrollment of 3,447 students and 372.3 classroom teachers (on an FTE basis), for a student–teacher ratio of 9.3:1. Schools in the district (with 2022–23 enrollment data from the National Center for Education Statistics) are Early Childhood Learning Center with 104 students in PreK, C. Richard Applegate Elementary School with 377 students in grades K–5, Joseph J. Catena Elementary School with 426 students in grades K–5, Laura Donovan Elementary School with 454 students in grades K–5, Marshall W. Errickson Elementary School with 453 students in grades K–5, West Freehold Elementary School with 456 students in grades K–5, Clifton T. Barkalow Middle School with 605 students in grades 6–8 and Dwight D. Eisenhower Middle School with 578 students in grades 6–8.

Students in ninth through twelfth grades attend either Freehold Township High School or Freehold High School, as part of the Freehold Regional High School District, with school assignment based on their home address. The district also serves students from Colts Neck Township, Englishtown, Farmingdale, Freehold Borough, Howell Township, Manalapan Township and Marlboro Township. Freehold Township High School is home to the Contemporary Global Studies Learning Center and Freehold High School hosts the Medical Sciences Learning Center; each program admits students on a selective basis from all over the Freehold Regional High School District. of the 2022–23 school year, Freehold Township High School had an enrollment of 1,926 students and 130.0 classroom teachers (on an FTE basis), for a student–teacher ratio of 14.8:1, while Freehold Borough High School had an enrollment of 1,409 students and 97.8 classroom teachers (on an FTE basis), for a student–teacher ratio of 14.4:1. The FRHSD board of education has nine members, who are elected to three-year terms from each of the constituent districts. Each member is allocated a fraction of a vote that totals to nine points, with Freehold Township allocated one member, who has 1.4 votes.

High school students in Freehold Township have the opportunity of attending vocational schools such as Biotechnology High School (which is located in the township on Kozloski Road), High Technology High School, the Marine Academy of Science and Technology, Communications High School, and the Academy of Allied Health & Science, which are part of the Monmouth County Vocational School District, which are available to all students in Monmouth County on a selective basis.

Brookdale Community College is a public community college. Founded in 1967, Brookdale is the community college of Monmouth County, its main headquarters is located in nearby Lincroft. The college also has regional satellite locations to better serve its students, including a location in Freehold Township on U.S. Route 9, serving the western Monmouth region. Additionally, the college offers courses to qualified high school students through its dual enrollment program, a valuable resource that some Freehold Township high school-aged students utilize in receiving early collegiate credits. Rutgers University, in partnership with Brookdale Community College offers several bachelor's degree completion programs at Brookdale's Freehold Campus. In 2022, Seton Hall University began a partnership with Brookdale Community College to offer courses and resources (including laboratories, designated study areas, and additional cooperatives with CentraState Medical Center) for their College of Nursing program, also at Brookdale's Freehold campus.

== Historic district ==
The Monmouth Battlefield Historic District is a 1,819-acre (736 ha) historic district within the much larger Monmouth Battlefield State Park, located on both sides of Route 522 and west of U.S. Route 9 on the border of Freehold Township and Manalapan Township.

The site of the battlefield originally contained many colonial-era farmhouses though many did not survive the rapid development of the area in the 20th century. Three of the original seven farmhouses that were present during the battle are still standing in the park. These include the Sutfin Farmhouse (1731); the Rhea-Applegate House (1745); and the Craig House (1746).

Three homes were built on the battlefield. The Conover–Perrine House (1832) is to the north of the park, erected on the site of the original 18th-century Perrine House, an important example of late Federal Architecture. The Italianate Cobb House was later constructed in 1872 near the Conover–Perrine House. The Combs' Farmhouse (mid-18th Century) was demolished sometime in the 1960s and was located near the park's playground and ice pond.

The district was added to the National Register of Historic Places on October 15, 1966, for its significance in military history and for the remaining settlement of colonial architecture and agriculture akin to the fated events of the Battle of Monmouth.

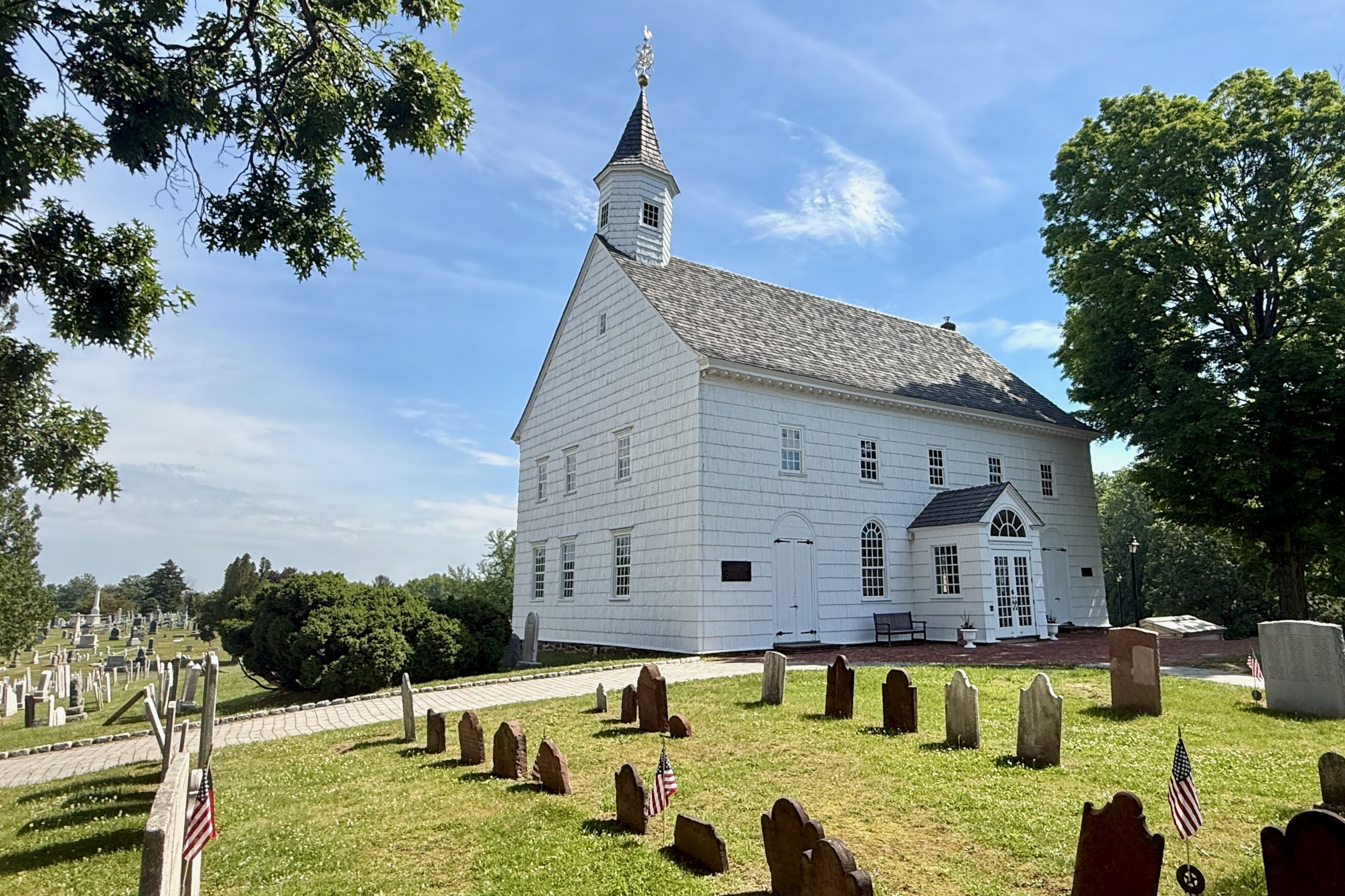
1753 Old Tennent Church

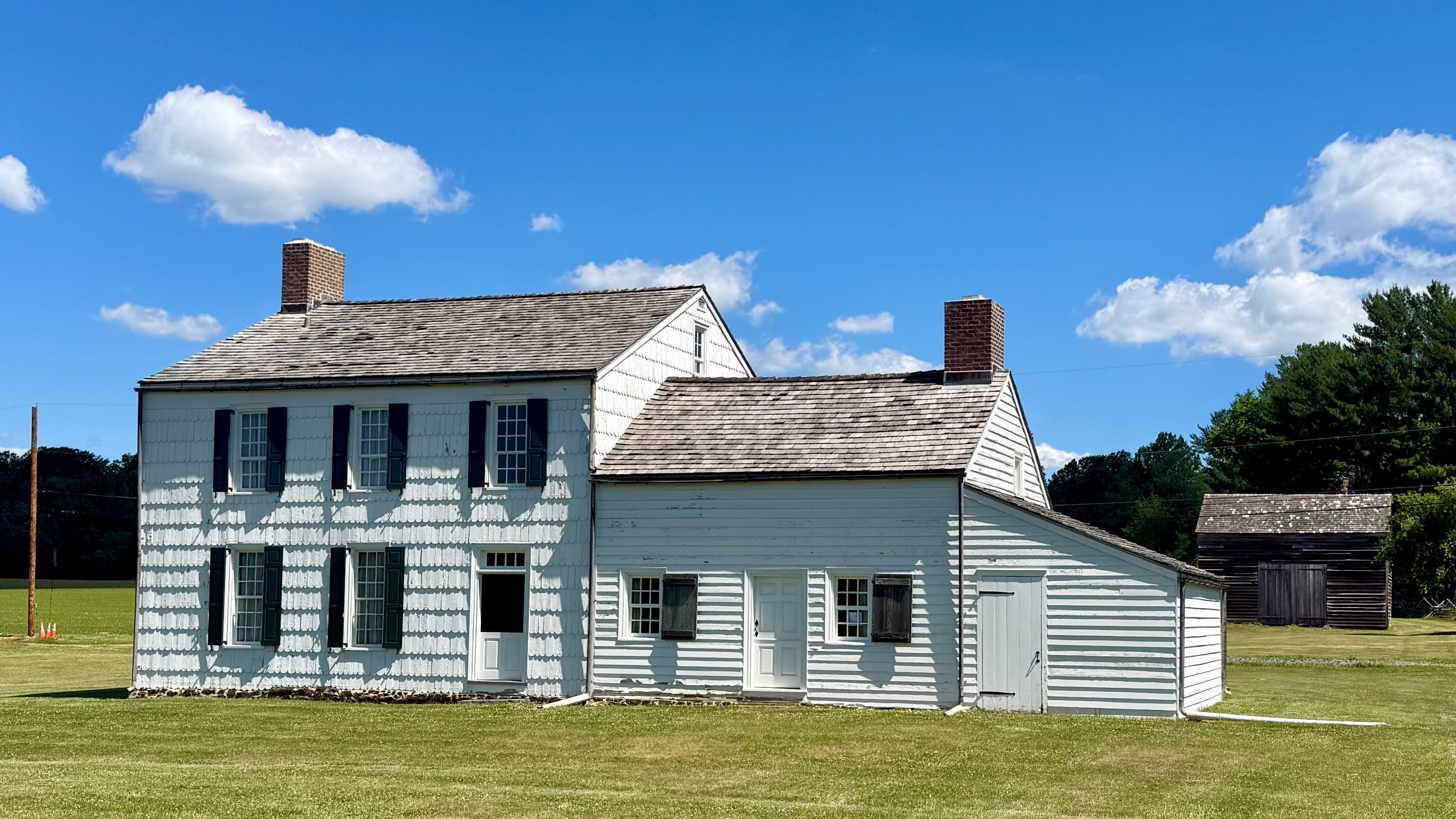
1746 Craig House

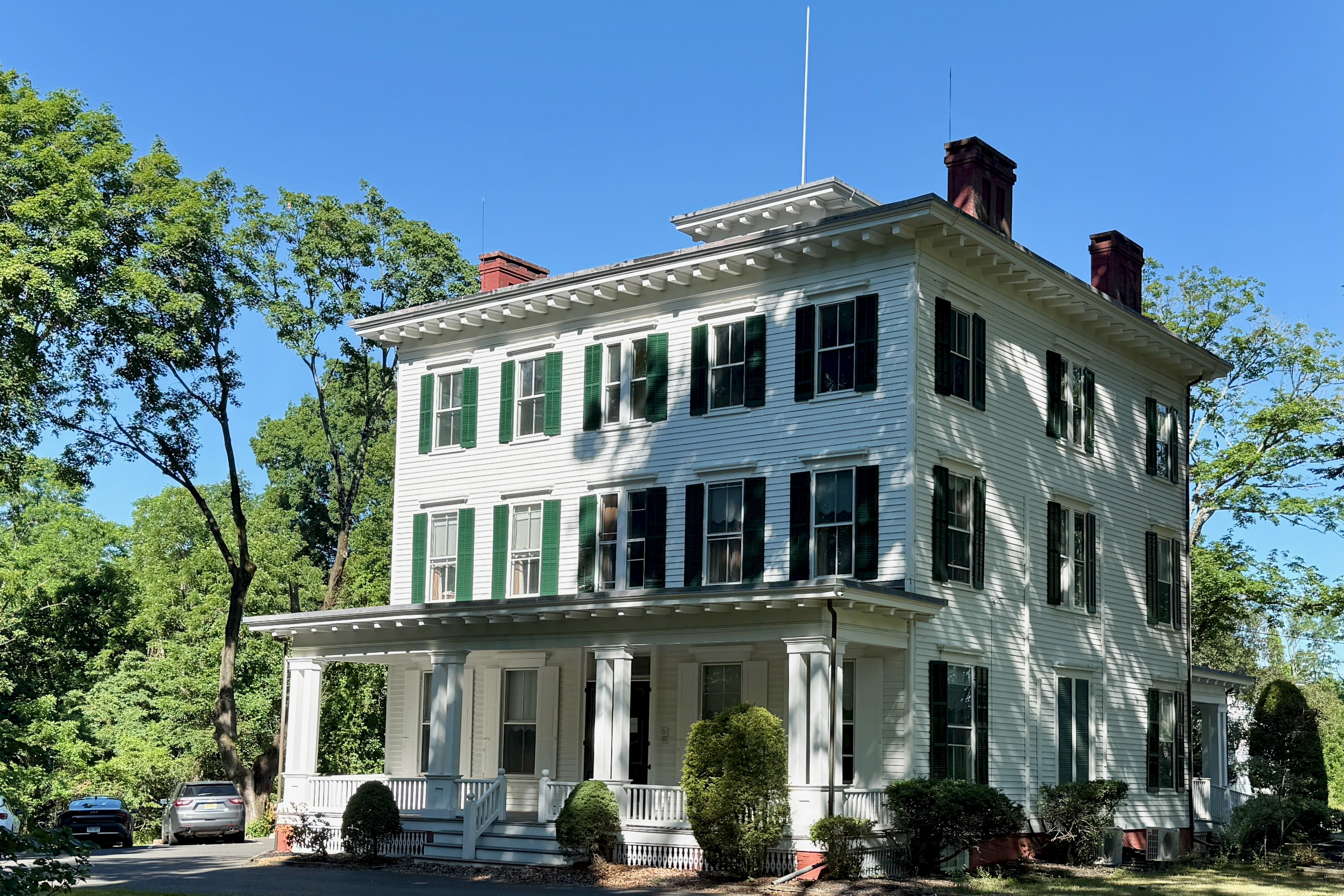
1872 Cobb House

1832 Conover–Perrine House

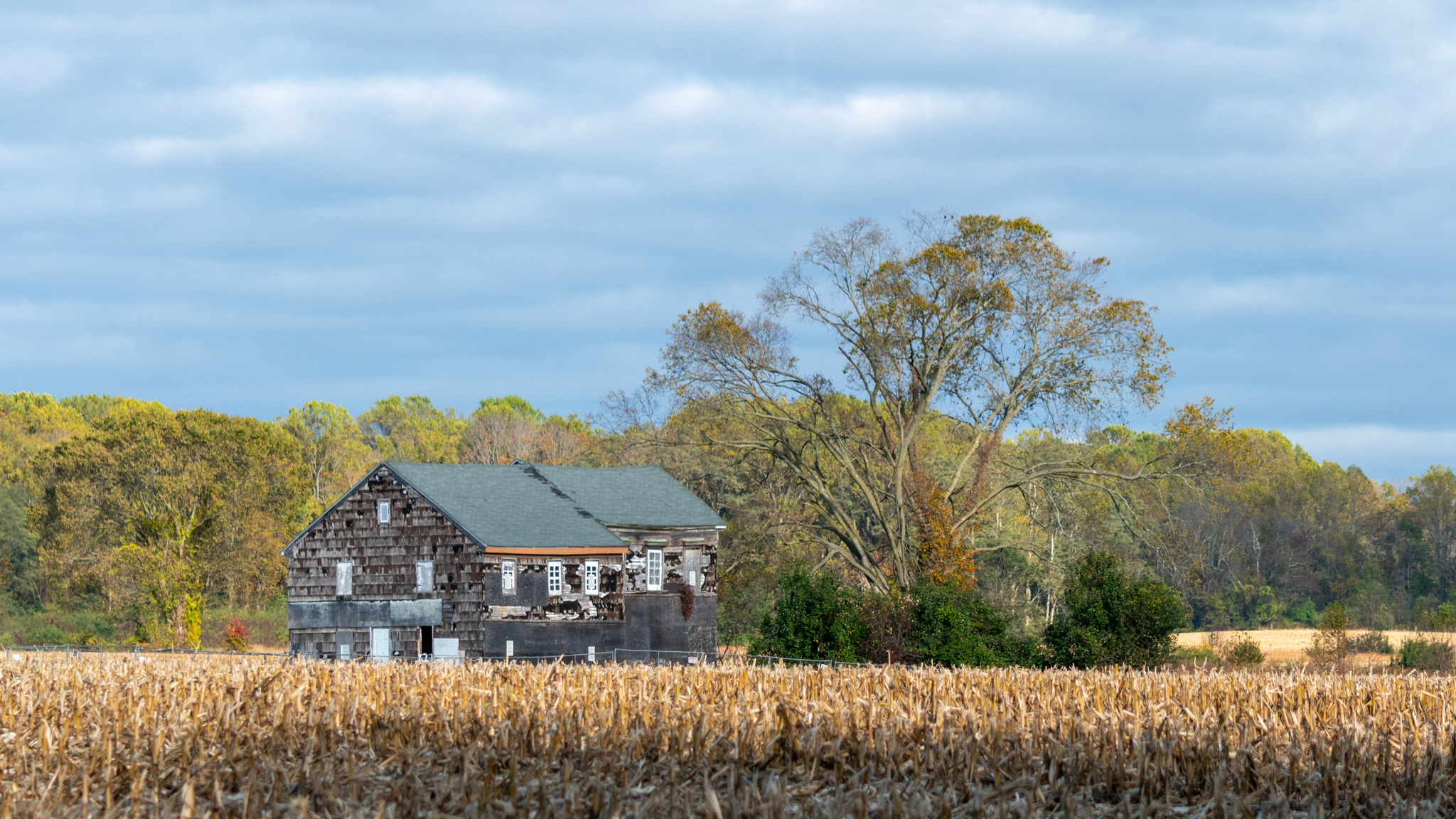
1731 Sutfin House

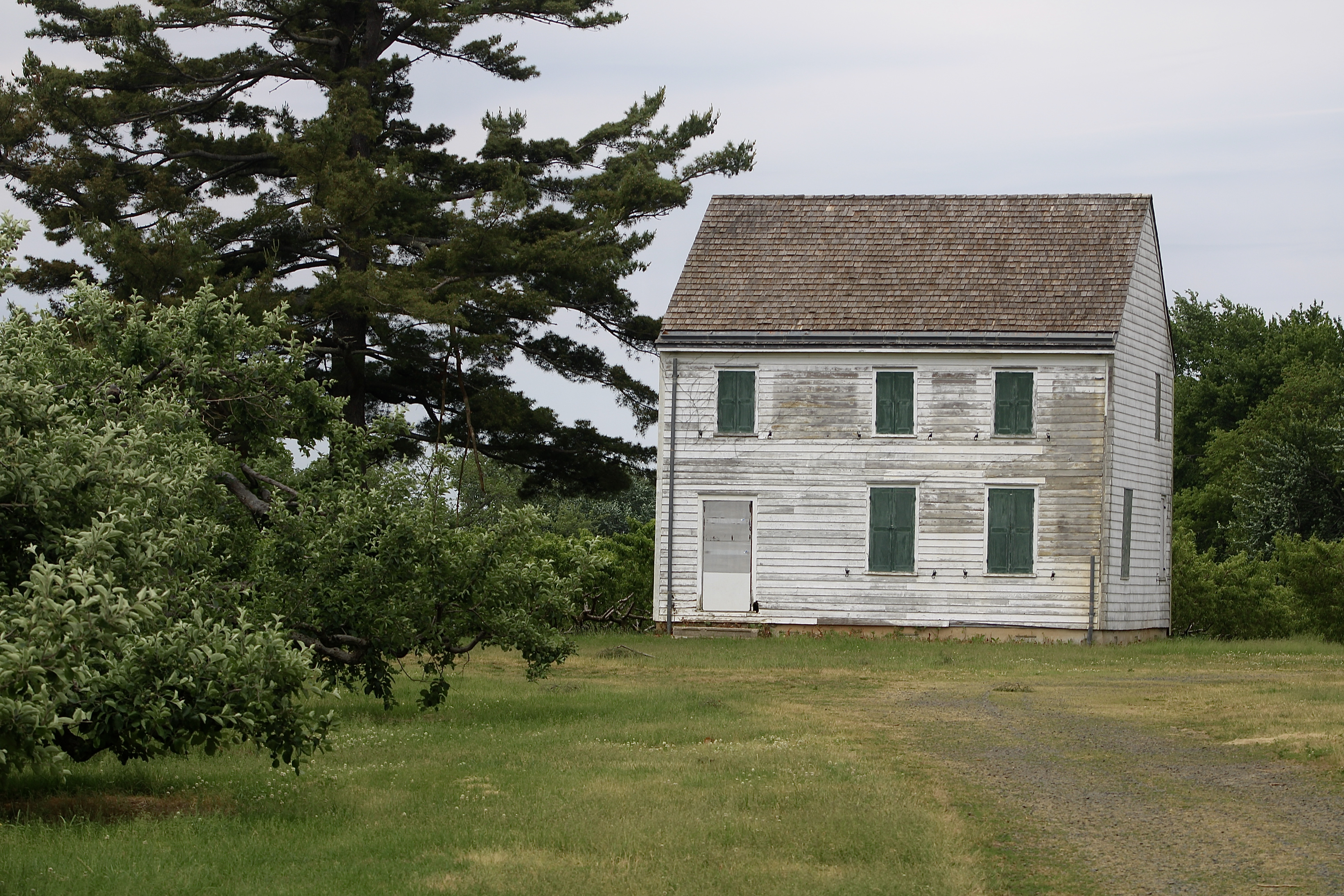
1745 Rhea Applegate House

== Infrastructure ==
=== Public safety ===
==== Emergency services ====
Freehold Township offers different departments of varying emergency services. The following are the emergency service departments in Freehold Township:

===== Police =====
The Freehold Township Police Department has three major divisions; patrol, investigation, and services. The Chief of Police is George Baumann, who was appointed to the position in January 2020, following the retirement of former chief Ernest Schriefer.

===== Fire prevention =====
The township offers various fire prevention programs for Freehold Township residents.

====== Courses ======
Freehold Township offers programs designed to prepare children on the importance of fire safety. These courses are engaging with students and are offered at Township schools and other municipal buildings.

====== Squads ======
Freehold Township has two volunteer fire companies:

West Freehold

- Freehold Township Independent Fire Company #1 is located on Stillwells Corner Road in West Freehold. It was established in 1964 to provide fire protection services across Freehold Township.
- Freehold Township Fire Company No. 1 Station No. 2 in Smithburg.
- Freehold Township Independent Fire Company No. 1 Station No. 3 in Georgia.

East Freehold

- East Freehold Fire Company (founded 1972) is located on Kozloski Road in East Freehold.

===== First aid squads =====
Freehold EMS (founded 1941) is located in Freehold Borough and offers pre-hospital care to residents of both the borough and the township.

=== Transportation ===
==== Roads and highways ====
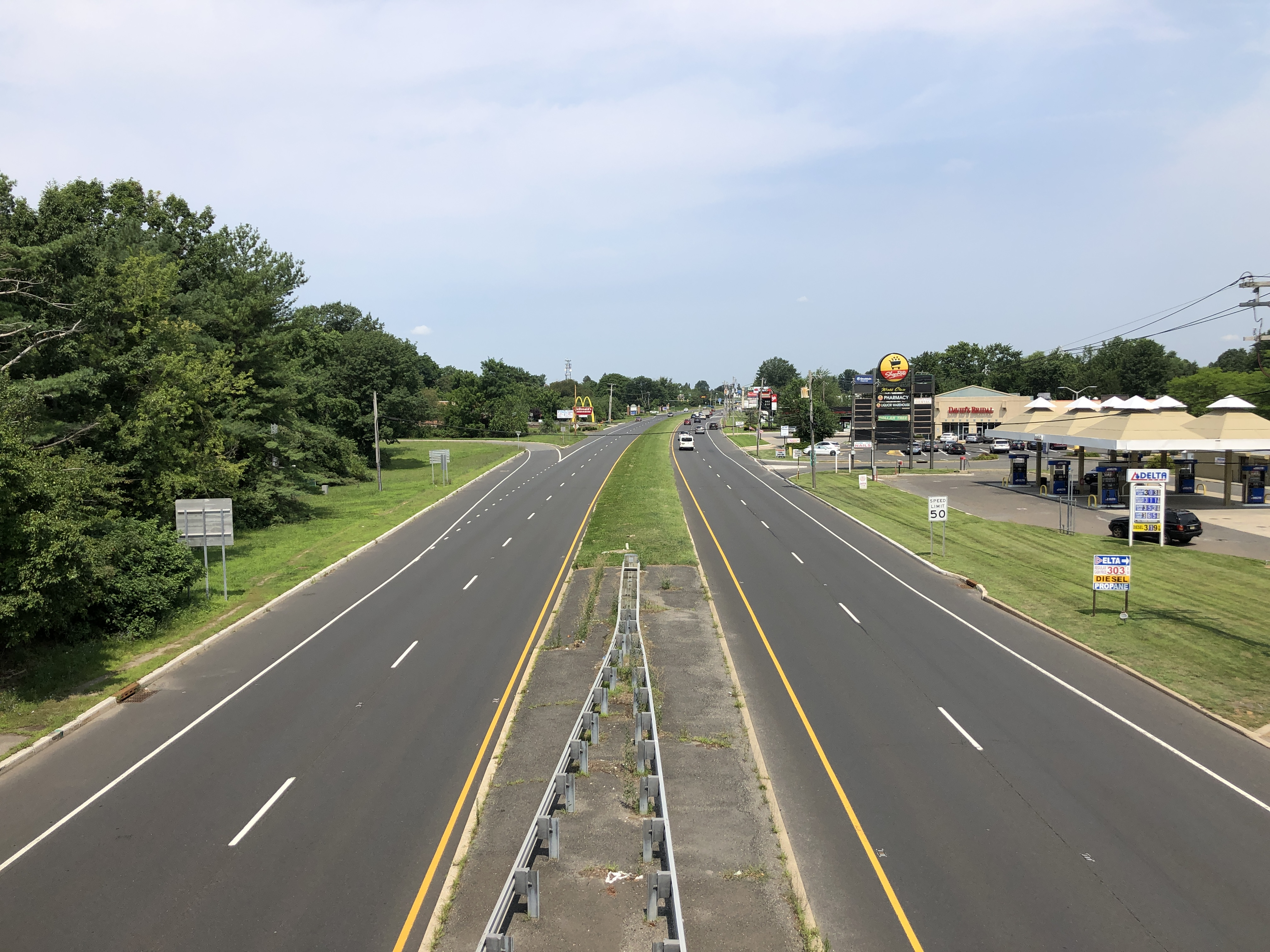
U.S. Route 9 northbound at the Route 33 interchange

As of May 2010, the township had a total of 200.13 miles (322.08 km) of roadways, of which 158.62 miles (255.27 km) were maintained by the municipality, 26.49 miles (42.63 km) by Monmouth County and 15.02 miles (24.17 km) by the New Jersey Department of Transportation.

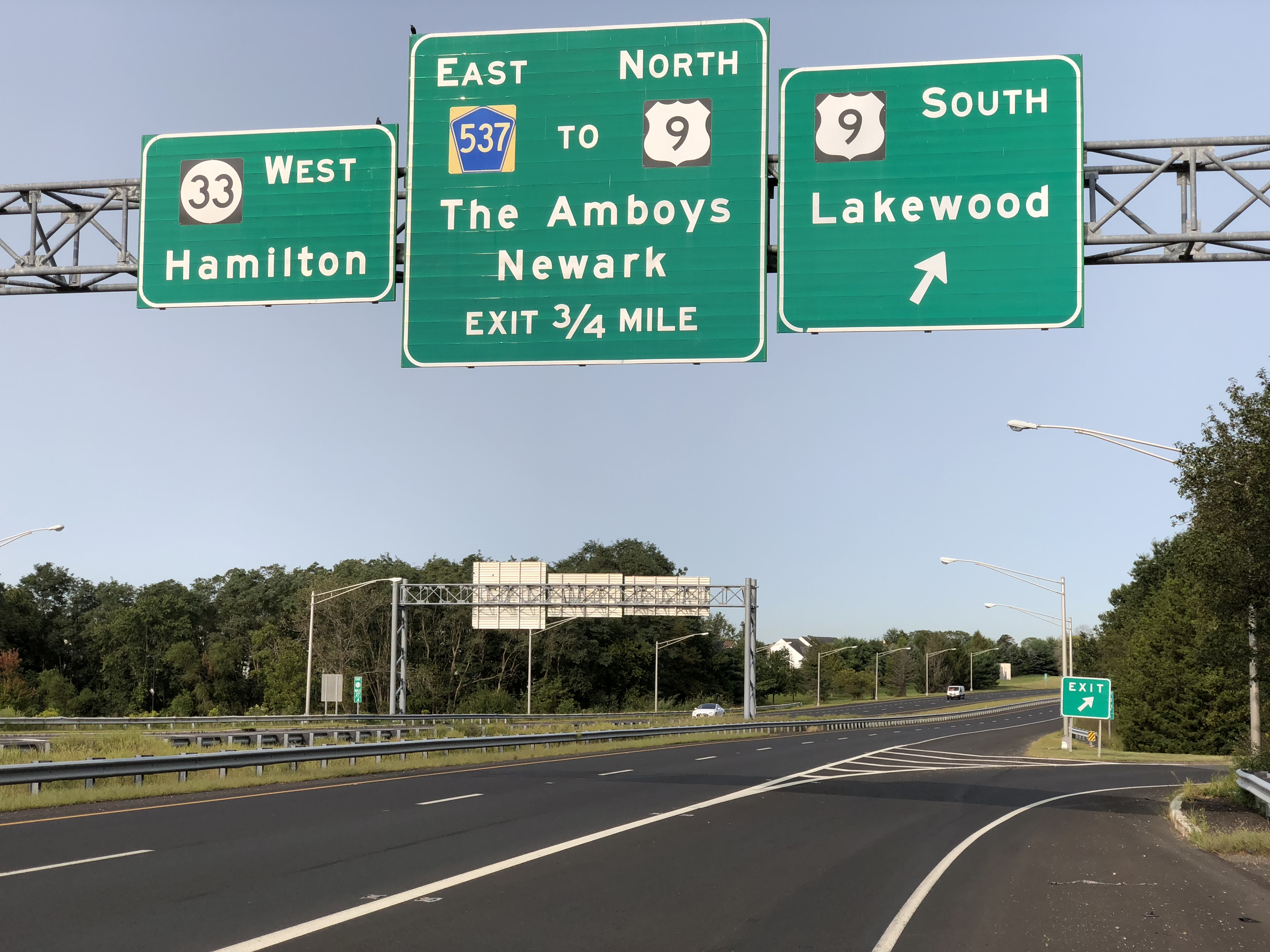
Route 33 westbound at the U.S. Route 9 interchange

Several major roads pass through the township. Major state routes include U.S. Route 9, Route 18, Route 33, and Route 79. Major county routes that pass through are County Route 522, County Route 524, County Route 527, and County Route 537.

Access to Interstate 195 is available in neighboring Howell Township via U.S. Route 9 or Jackson Township via County Route 537. The Garden State Parkway entrance at Exit 100 is about ten miles east on Route 33 in Tinton Falls. The New Jersey Turnpike entrance at exit 8 is about 10 miles (16 km) west on Route 33 in East Windsor.

==== Public transportation ====
===== Rail =====
In the 19th & 20th centuries, Freehold Borough and Freehold Township had two major railways. One major railway in the area was the Freehold and Jamesburg Agricultural Railroad, which was owned and operated by the Camden & Amboy Railroad Company. Surveying for the line began on September 8, 1851, grading began on October 19, 1852, and the first track was laid on April 4, 1853. The first section of line was opened on July 18, 1853. The establishment of the Freehold & Jamesburg Agricultural Railroad helped make the Freeholds a transportation hub. The other major railway in the area was the Central Railroad of New Jersey, which had a branch that connected the still-active former Penn Central line from Jamesburg to CNJ's Seashore Branch and the New York and Long Branch line (now owned by NJ Transit) at Matawan.

The Freehold and Jamesburg Railroad was abandoned by the early 1930s. A 2.8-mile-long (4.5 km) portion of the former railroad's right-of-way was later approved to be sold by the New Jersey Board of Public Utility Commissioners to Jersey Central Power & Light Company in 1966, with occasional freight service still being used through the Freehold Industrial Track. Meanwhile, The Central Railroad of New Jersey went into bankruptcy in the early 1970s and entered into Conrail on April 1, 1976, with its freight service on the rails from Freehold to Matawan being terminated in 1979 (the rails were removed in 1980). Today, it is mostly a rail-trail, converting into the Henry Hudson Trail.

The Monmouth Ocean Middlesex Line is a proposal by NJ Transit to restore passenger railway service to the region, by using the same tracks as the Freehold Industrial Track. The township and its neighboring borough would be potential stops for the 'MOM' Line.

As of now, the nearest train stations to the township are located at Aberdeen-Matawan, Asbury Park and Long Branch on the North Jersey Coast Line, and Metropark (in Iselin), New Brunswick and Princeton Junction on the Northeast Corridor Line.

===== Buses =====
NJ Transit provides bus service to communities along U.S. Route 9 from Lakewood Township to Old Bridge Township, and to the Port Authority Bus Terminal in New York City via bus routes 131, 135 and 139, to Newark Airport and Newark at large on the 67 route, to Jersey City on the 64 and 67, as well as shopping via local service on the 833, and 836 routes. Bus service is available from Route 9 to Wall Street in New York's Financial District via the Academy Bus Line.

There are several bus stops to the points listed above located along Route 9 in the township. Freehold Township has two commuter parking lots available only to township residents, which are located at the Freehold Mall Shopping Center and on Schibanoff Lane.

===== Aviation =====
Following the closure of the Marlboro Airport, Old Bridge Airport in Old Bridge Township and Monmouth Executive Airport in Farmingdale supply short-distance flights to surrounding areas and are the closest air transportation services. The nearest major commercial airports are Trenton-Mercer Airport, which serves several domestic destinations via Frontier Airlines and located 24 miles (39 km) west (about 36 minutes drive); and Newark Airport, which serves as a major hub for United Airlines and located 35 miles (56 km) north (about 50 minutes drive) from the center of Freehold Township.

===== Ferry =====
Ferry service is available through the SeaStreak service in Highlands, a trip that involves about a 25–30-minute drive from the eastern section of Freehold Township to reach the departing terminal. SeaStreak offers ferry service to New York City with trips to Pier 11 (on the East River at Wall Street) and 35th Street in Manhattan.

=== Healthcare ===
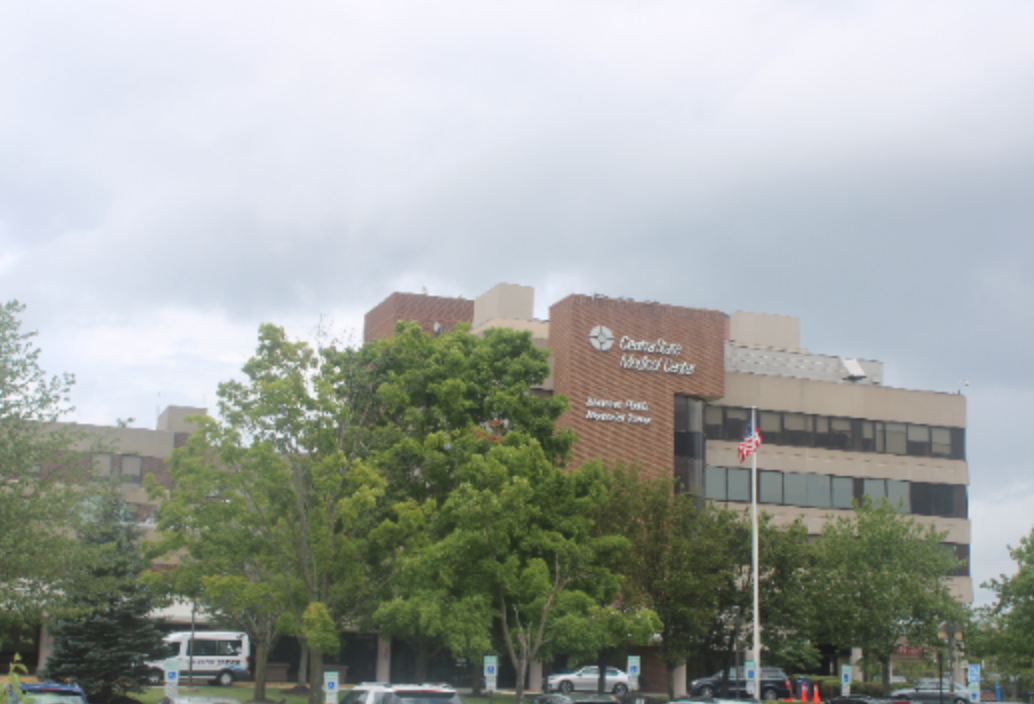
CentraState Medical Center

CentraState Medical Center is a 287-bed regional hospital located in the township. Serving parts of Monmouth, Ocean, Middlesex, and Mercer counties in Central New Jersey, the hospital is a partner of Atlantic Health System and is affiliated with Rutgers Robert Wood Johnson Medical School. The hospital is part of CentraState Healthcare System, the county's fourth-largest employer. Other regional hospitals near the township include the Lakewood Township division of Monmouth Medical Center and the Old Bridge Township division of Raritan Bay Medical Center.

The closest major university hospitals to the township are Jersey Shore University Medical Center in Neptune Township, Penn Medicine Princeton Medical Center in Plainsboro Township, and Saint Peter's University Hospital and Robert Wood Johnson University Hospital in New Brunswick.

== Points of interest ==
- CentraState Medical Center – A regional hospital for western Monmouth County.
- Freehold Raceway – One of the oldest harness racing tracks in the country.
- Freehold Raceway Mall – The second-largest mall in the state.
- Maplewood Cemetery – New Jersey Governors Joel Parker and Joseph D. Bedle, as well as several officers who served in the Civil War are interred here.
- Monmouth Battlefield – This historic park preserves where the Battle of Monmouth was fought.
- Turkey Swamp Park – A 1,180-acre (480 ha) nature preserve in the northernmost swaths of the Pine Barrens.
- West Freehold – Historic community in the western portion of the township, at the intersection of Monmouth Road and Stillwells Corner Road/Wemrock Road.
- Jewish Heritage Museum of Monmouth County – Highlights history of Jewish residents and culture in Monmouth County
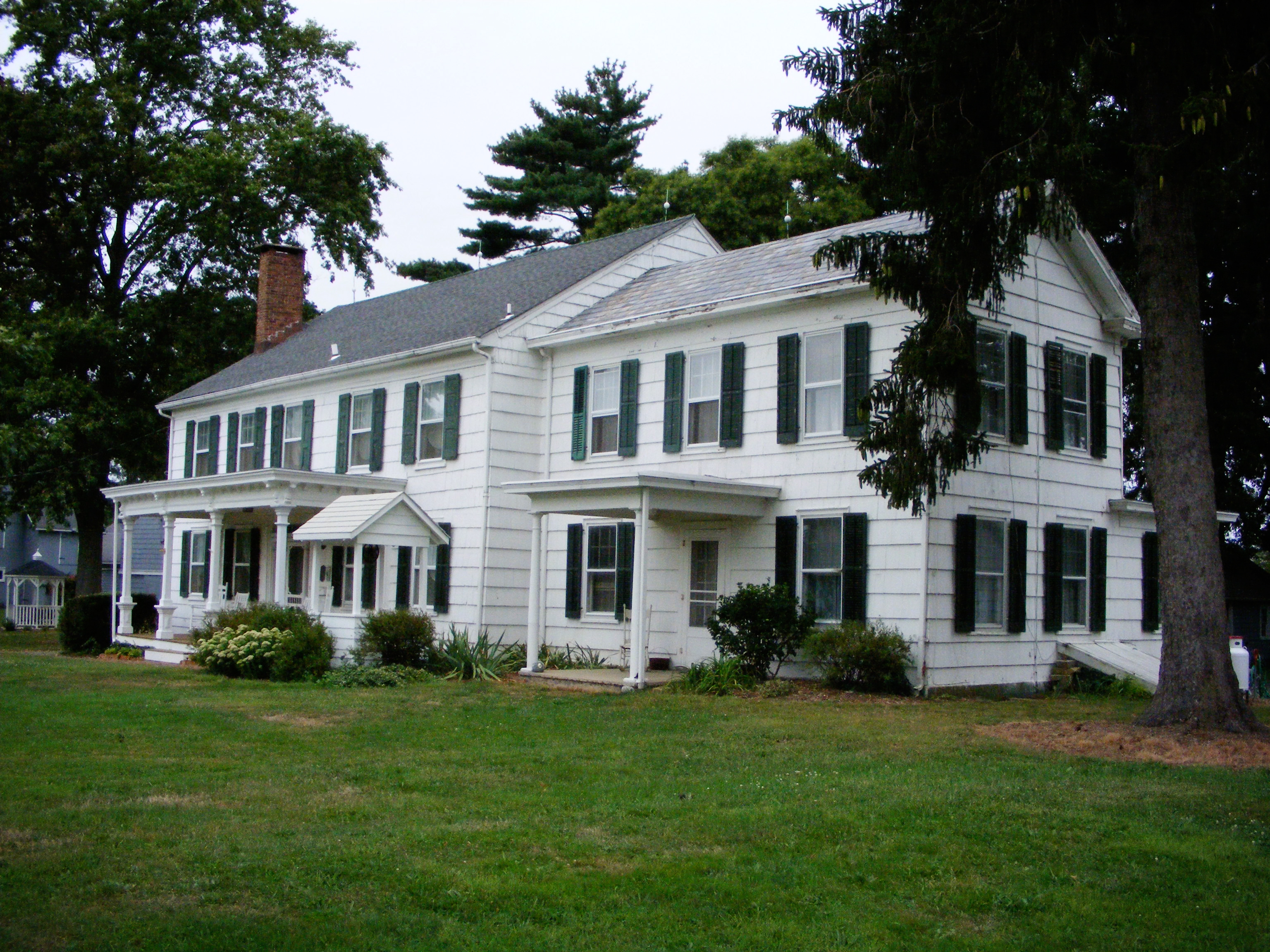
Oakley Farmhouse, 2012

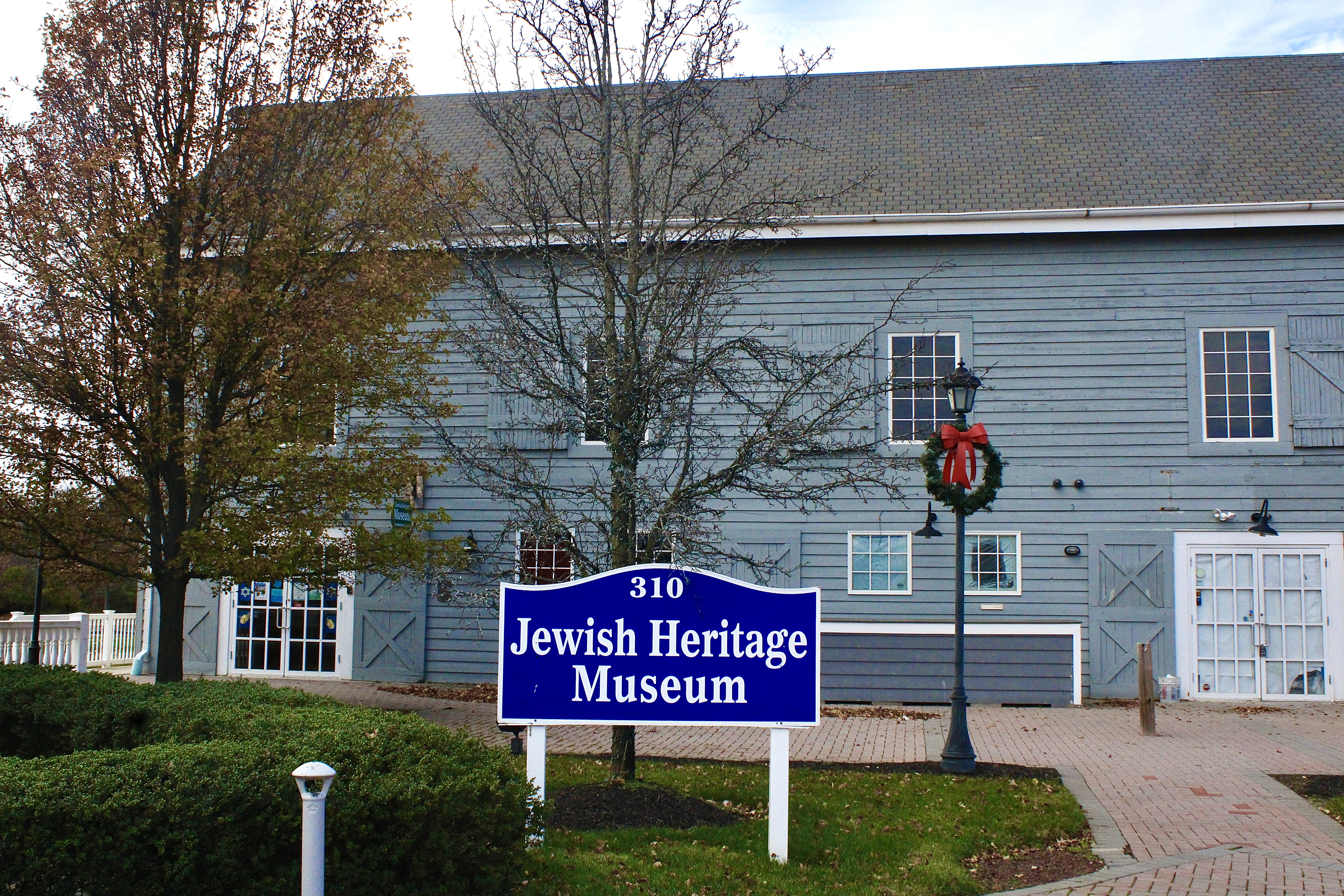
Jewish Heritage Museum at Mounts Corner, 2021

== Notable people ==
People who were born in, residents of, or otherwise closely associated with Freehold Township include:

- Amanda Anisimova (born 2001), professional tennis player
- Jake Areman (born 1996), soccer player who plays for the Tampa Bay Rowdies in the USL Championship.
- Danny Bohn (born 1988), NASCAR Gander Outdoors Truck Series driver
- Brad Brach (born 1986), professional baseball player
- Brian Brikowski (born 1989), defensive end who played in the Canadian Football League with the Montreal Alouettes
- Dave Cantin (born 1979), entrepreneur
- Danielle Colaprico (born 1992), midfielder for the Chicago Red Stars of the National Women's Soccer League
- Joe Dailey, American football coach who is the wide receivers coach for the Carolina Panthers
- Katie Dippold, comedy writer, actress, and improvisational comedian who has co-produced and written for Parks and Recreation
- Joann Downey (born 1966), attorney and former Assemblywoman who represented the 11th Legislative District in the New Jersey General Assembly from 2016 until 2021.
- Clare Farragher (born 1941), member of the New Jersey General Assembly from 1988 to 2002 who also served as mayor of Freehold Township
- Michele Fitzgerald (born 1990), winner of Survivor: Kaôh Rōng in 2016, the 32nd season of the reality series Survivor
- Lindsey Gallo (born 1981), former track and field athlete who competed in middle-distance events
- George T. Garrett (born 1944), US Army major general
- Milton Goode (born 1960), high jumper who participated at the 1984 Summer Olympics
- Vin Gopal (born 1985), community organizer and politician who has represented the 11th Legislative District in the New Jersey Senate since 2018
- Robert Griswold (born 1996), swimmer
- Thomas Henderson (1743–1824), acting Governor of New Jersey
- William Barberie Howell (1865–1927), Chief Justice of the United States Customs Court
- Robert Kolodny, film director, writer and cinematographer
- Dan Lewis (1936–2015), American football halfback / fullback who played in the NFL for the Detroit Lions, Washington Redskins and New York Giants
- Caren Lissner (born 1972), novelist
- Paulie Litt (born 1995), actor and producer, best known for his role as Justin Shanowski on the sitcom Hope & Faith
- Val Majewski (born 1981), center fielder who played for the Baltimore Orioles
- Catello Manzi (born 1950), harness racing driver
- Rebecca Metz, actress known for her role as Tressa on the FX television comedy-drama series Better Things
- Joel Parker (1816–1888), politician, who served as the 20th Governor of New Jersey from 1863 to 1866, and again from 1872 to 1875
- Kal Penn (born 1977), actor of Harold & Kumar Go to White Castle
- Charles Richman, former commissioner of the New Jersey Department of Community Affairs
- William Cortenus Schenck (1773–1821), founder of Newark, Ohio, member of the Ohio Senate from 1803 to 1804.
- Peter Schrager (born 1982), sportscaster on Fox Sports and NFL Network
- John A. Scudder (1759–1836), U.S. Representative from New Jersey
- Pamela Springsteen (born 1962), actress who appeared in Fast Times at Ridgemont High and is the younger sister of Bruce Springsteen
- Erik Stocklin (born 1982), actor of Haters Back Off and Lucifer, and husband of YouTuber Colleen Ballinger (Miranda Sings)
- Jaime Primak Sullivan (born c. 1977), reality television star of Jersey Belle
- John C. Ten Eyck (1814–1879), United States Senator from New Jersey from 1859 to 1865
- William H. Vredenburgh (1840–1920), attorney and public figure who served for nearly 20 years as a judge of the New Jersey Court of Errors and Appeals
- Emily Wold (born 1994), former field hockey player, who played as a midfielder

== See also ==
- Adelphia, New Jersey
- Burlington Heights, New Jersey
- East Freehold, New Jersey
- West Freehold, New Jersey
- Freehold Borough, New Jersey
- Georgia, New Jersey
- Smithburg, New Jersey
- Upper Freehold Township, New Jersey

== Sources ==
- Adelberg, Michael S. The American Revolution in Monmouth County:The Theatre of Spoil and Destruction, The History Press, 2010. ISBN 9781609490010
- Pepe, Barbara. Freehold: A Home Town History, Arcadia Publishing; Charleston, SC; 2003. ISBN 9780738524184.
