= List of turnpikes in New Jersey =

Private company's built roads

This is a list of turnpike roads, built and operated by private companies in exchange for the privilege of collecting a toll, in the U.S. state of New Jersey, mainly in the 19th century. While most of the roads are now maintained as free public roads, some have been abandoned.

Name		Chartered	Routing	Modern designation	Built?	Notes
Morris Turnpike		March 9, 1801	Elizabeth - Union - Morristown - Netcong - Newton - Culver's Gap	Route 82, Route 124, Sussex Ave, Sussex Turnpike, Main St, U.S. Route 46, Route 183, U.S. Route 206, County Route 519, Morris Turnpike	Yes	
Belleville Bridge and Turnpike Road Association		November 23, 1802	Belleville - Kearny	Route 7	Yes	
Bergen Turnpike		November 30, 1802	Hackensack - Ridgefield - Hoboken	Hudson Street, Bergen Turnpike, Edgewater Avenue, U.S. Route 1/9, Bergen Turnpike, 32nd St, Hackensack Plank Road, Clinton Street	Yes	
Union Turnpike	Main Road	February 23, 1804	Morristown - Morris Plains - Dover - Sparta - Branchville - Culver's Gap - Montague - Pennsylvania	U.S. Route 202, Mountain Way, Route 10, Mount Pleasant Turnpike, Salem Street, Route 15, Route 181, Route 15, U.S. Route 206, Union Turnpike, U.S. Route 206	Yes	
Union Turnpike	Branch	January 16, 1812	Dover - Succasunna	Blackwell Street, U.S. 46	Yes	
Trenton and New Brunswick Turnpike		November 14, 1804	Trenton - New Brunswick	Brunswick Ave, U.S. Route 1 Business, U.S. Route 1, Route 26	Yes	
Newark Turnpike		December 1, 1804	Hoboken - Jersey City - Harrison - Newark	Newark Avenue, Route 7, County Route 508	Yes	
Newark and Pompton Turnpike	Main Road	February 24, 1806	Newark - Bloomfield - Montclair - Singac - Riverdale	County Route 506 Spur, County Route 506, Route 23, Old Turnpike Road, Route 23, Holy Cross Way, Route 23, Newark Pompton Turnpike, Route 23, Newark Pompton Turnpike	Yes	Northernmost 6 miles abandoned 1830; abandoned north of Mountain View 1861; abandoned within Newark 1868; fully abandoned 1870
Newark and Pompton Turnpike	Branch	February 24, 1806	Montclair - Caldwell - Pine Brook	County Route 506	Yes	
New Jersey Turnpike		February 27, 1806	New Brunswick - Bound Brook - Somerville - Lebanon - Clinton - Bloomsbury - Phillipsburg - Pennsylvania	County Route 527, Route 28, U.S. Route 22, Route 122	Yes	
Newark and Mount Pleasant Turnpike		February 27, 1806	Newark - West Orange - Dover	Orange St, Main St, Mount Pleasant Ave, Route 10	Yes	
Essex and Middlesex Turnpike		March 3, 1806	New Brunswick - Metuchen - Rahway - Elizabeth - Newark	Route 27, Northeast Corridor right-of-way to Broad Street	Yes	
Franklin Turnpike		March 3, 1806	Ho-Ho-Kus - Allendale - Mahwah - New York (Orange Turnpike)	Franklin Turnpike, County Route 507	Yes	
Paterson and Hamburg Turnpike		March 3, 1806	Paterson - Riverdale - Bloomingdale - Hamburg - Sussex - Montague - Pennsylvania	W Broadway, Central Ave, Hamburg Turnpike, Route 23, County Route 515, Hamburgh Turnpike, Route 23, Libertyville Road, Deckertown Turnpike	Yes	
Springfield and Newark Turnpike		March 3, 1806	Springfield - Irvington - Newark	Route 124, Springfield Avenue	Yes	
Washington Turnpike	Main Road	March 3, 1806	Morristown - Mendham - Chester - Schooley's Mountain - Washington - Phillipsburg - Pennsylvania;	County Route 510, County Route 513, County Route 517, Pleasant Grove Road, Penwell Road, Route 57	Yes	
Washington Turnpike	Branch	March 3, 1806	Schooley's Mountain - Hackettstown	County Route 517	Yes	
Hunterdon and Sussex Turnpike		March 12, 1806	Trenton - Hope		No	
Jefferson Turnpike		December 3, 1807	Jefferson - West Milford	Berkshire Valley Road, Oak Ridge Road	No	
Princeton and Kingston Branch Turnpike	Main Road	December 3, 1807	Trenton - Princeton - Kingston	County Route 583, Route 27, Raymond Boulevard	Yes	
Princeton and Kingston Branch Turnpike	Branch	February 26, 1834	Kingston - Georgetown Franklin Turnpike	Route 27	Yes	
Belleville Turnpike		November 15, 1808	Belleville - Glen Ridge	County Route 506	Yes	
Perth Amboy Turnpike		November 22, 1808	Perth Amboy - Metuchen - Piscataway - Bound Brook	New Brunswick Avenue, County Route 501	Incomplete beyond Piscataway	
Woodbridge Turnpike		November 22, 1808	New Brunswick - Woodbridge - Rahway	County Route 514	Yes	
Burlington Turnpike		November 24, 1808	Burlington - Bordentown - Trenton and New Brunswick Turnpike	Bordentown Road - U.S. Route 130 - Burlington St - U.S. 206 - County Route 533	Yes	
Jersey City and Acquackanonk Turnpike		November 28, 1808	Acquackanonk Landing - Jersey City		No	
Parsippany and Rockaway Turnpike		November 14, 1809	Pine Brook - Parsippany - Denville - Rockaway - Wharton	U.S. Route 46, Main Street, Mount Pleasant Avenue	No	
Water Gap Turnpike		February 8, 1811	Netcong - Allamuchy - Hope - Delaware Water Gap		No	
Farmers' Turnpike		February 9, 1811	Springfield - New Providence - Long Hill - Pluckemin - Potterstown		No?	
Ringwood and Long Pond Turnpike		February 9, 1811	Ringwood - Greenwood Lake - New York	County Route 511, Warwick Turnpike	Yes	
Newark and Morris Turnpike		February 11, 1811	Newark - South Orange - Morristown	County Route 510	Yes	
New Milford Turnpike		February 14, 1811	Ringwood - Greenwood Lake - New York	County Route 511, Warwick Turnpike	No?	Built by Ringwood and Long Pond Turnpike Company
Vernon Turnpike		February 14, 1811	Paterson and Hamburg Turnpike - Vernon - New York	Route 94 (in part)	Yes	
Dover Turnpike		January 12, 1813	Dover - Drakesville	US 46	Yes	
Spruce Run Turnpike		January 12, 1813	Clinton - Hampton - Washington - Oxford	Route 31	Yes	
Hope and Hackettstown Turnpike		February 11, 1813	Hackettstown - Hope		No	
New Germantown Turnpike		February 11, 1813	North Branch - Lamington - Oldwick - Long Valley	County Route 665, County Route 523, County Route 517	Yes	
Deckertown and Newton Turnpike		January 27, 1814	New York - Sussex - Newton	Lake Wallkill Road, Owen's Station Road, Bassetts Bridge Road, Route 284, Unionville Avenue, Newton Avenue, Loomis Avenue, County Route 565, U.S. Route 206	Yes	Connected to Great Island Turnpike at its northern end
Vernon and Newton Turnpike		January 27, 1814	New York - Vernon - Hamburg - Newton		No	
New Brunswick and Middleburgh Turnpike		February 11, 1814			No	
Hackensack and Paterson Turnpike		February 6, 1815	Paterson - Elmwood Park - Saddle Brook - Hackensack	Market Street, Essex Street	Yes	
Mount Hope and Longwood Turnpike		February 11, 1815	Rockaway and Parsippany Turnpike - Mount Hope - Union Turnpike	Wall St, Academy St, Mt Hope Road	Incomplete beyond Mt. Hope	
New Providence Turnpike		February 11, 1815	Morristown - New Providence - Scotch Plains		No	
Georgetown and Franklin Turnpike		February 15, 1816	New Brunswick - Rocky Hill - Hopewell - Lambertville - Pennsylvania	Route 27, County Route 518	Yes	
Bordentown and South Amboy Turnpike		February 16, 1816	Bordentown - Washington - Hightstown - Cranbury - Jamesburg - Spotswood - Old Bridge - South Amboy	U.S. Route 130, Route 33, Main Street, County Route 535, Bordentown Turnpike, County Route 615	Yes	
Woodbridge and Blazing Star Turnpike		February 16, 1816	Woodbridge - Carteret - New York (Richmond Turnpike via New Blazing Star ferry)	Port Reading Avenue	Yes	
Pochuck Turnpike		February 12, 1817	Hamburg - Glenwood - New York	County Route 517	Incomplete south of McAfee	
Columbia and Walpack Turnpike		January 21, 1819	Columbia - Millbrook - Walpack - Tuttles Corner	Interstate 80, Old Mine Road, National Park Service Route 615, Bevans Road, Layton-Hainesville Road	Yes	
Newton Turnpike		February 6, 1819	Andover Furnace - Newton - Culver's Gap		No	
Paterson and New Antrim Turnpike		November 23, 1825	Paterson - Saddle River - Franklin		No	
Paterson and New Prospect Turnpike		November 23, 1825	Paterson - Ho-Ho-Kus		No	
Passaic and Hackensack Ferry and Road		January 21, 1828	Newark - Jersey City	Newark Avenue, Communipaw Ave/U.S. Route 1/9 Truck, Ferry Street	Yes	
Hackensack and Fort Lee Turnpike		January 23, 1828	Hackensack - Fort Lee	Fort Lee Road, Main Street	Yes	
Passaic Turnpike		February 2, 1833	Paterson - Little Falls	McBride Ave, Paterson Ave	Yes	
Delaware and Jobstown Rail or McAdamised Road		February 11, 1833	Florence - Columbus - Jobstown		No	Reorganized as the Delaware & Atlantic Railroad Company
Weehawken Turnpike		March 2, 1837	Weehawken - Fort Lee	Park Ave, Palisade Avenue	Yes	Included in the bill creating Weehawken. Disbanded March 18, 1858
Haddonfield and Camden Turnpike		March 9, 1839	Haddonfield - Camden	County Route 561	Yes	
Red Bank and Woodbury Turnpike or McAdamized Road		March 8, 1848	Red Bank - Woodbury	Red Bank Ave	Yes	1853: Extended through Woodbury along Broad St
Newark Plank Road and Ferry		February 24, 1849	Newark - Jersey City	Newark Avenue, Communipaw Ave/U.S. Route 1/9 Truck, Ferry Street	Yes	
Camden, Ellisburg and Marlton Turnpike		February 28, 1849	Camden - Marlton	Route 70, Old Marlton Pike	Yes	
Moorestown and Camden Turnpike		February 28, 1849	Moorestown - Camden	County Route 537	Yes	
Mullica Hill and Red Bank Turnpike or McAdamized Road		February 28, 1849	Mullica Hill - Berkley - Red Bank	Grove Ave	Unbuilt south of Thorofare	Road that was built maintained by Mantua Creek and Red Bank Turnpike
Mullica Hill and Woodbury Turnpike		February 28, 1849	Mullica Hill - Woodbury	Route 45	Yes	Attempted to unite with Woodbury and Camden TP as Mullica Hill and Camden TP, though later charter amendments refer to the companies separately
Westfield and Camden Turnpike	Main Road	February 28, 1849	Camden - Pennsauken	Westfield Avenue, U.S. Route 130	Yes	Extended to Bridgeboro 1852 and Cooperstown 1853 Locally known as Burlington TP
Westfield and Camden Turnpike	Branch	March 5, 1852	Cinnaminson - Palmyra	Cinnaminson Avenue	Yes	
Williamstown and Camden Road		February 28, 1849	Williamstown - Cross Keys - Blackwoodtown - Chew's Landing - Mount Ephraim - Haddonfield & Camden Turnpike		No	
Woodbury and Camden Turnpike		February 28, 1849	Woodbury - Camden	Broadway, S Hannevig Ave, Broad St	Yes	Attempted to unite with Mullica Hill and Woodbury TP as Mullica Hill and Camden TP, though later charter amendments refer to the companies separately
Mullica Hill and Camden Turnpike		March 1, 1849	Mullica Hill - Mantua - Woodbury	Route 45, Broadway	No/A	An attempt to unite the Mullica Hill and Woodbury TP and the Woodbury and Camden TP, though later charter amendments refer to the companies separately
Belleville and Newark Plank Road		March 2, 1849	Newark - Belleville		No	
Glassboro and Carpenter's Landing Turnpike		February 4, 1850	Glassboro - Mantua		Yes	Postal records indicate the company was in business by at least 1904
Raritan and Delaware Plank Road		February 18, 1850	New Brunswick - Trenton		No	
South River and Freehold Plank Road		February 19, 1850	Old Bridge - Freehold		No	Converted to railroad
Monmouth County Plank Road		February 20, 1850	Freehold - Marlboro - Middletown Point - Keyport	Route 79, County Route 516, County Route 6	Yes	
Gloucester Turnpike		March 5, 1850	Woodbury - Westville - Gloucester		Yes?	Revived 1874. May be same as Mullica Hill and Camden TP
Jersey City and Bergen Point Plank Road		March 6, 1850	Jersey City - Bayonne - Bergen Point	Grand Street, Ocean Avenue, Broadway	Yes	
Coleville and Carpenter's Point Turnpike		February 21, 1851	Colesville - Montague Twp	Route 23	Yes	
Pittstown and Barnsboro Turnpike		February 28, 1851	Pittstown - Hardingville - Barnsboro	County Route 609 (Salem/Gloucester County)	Yes	
Cape Island Turnpike		March 1, 1851	Cape May Point - Cape Island	Sunset Boulevard	Yes	
Gloucester and Salem Turnpike		March 6, 1851	Woodbury - Clarksboro - Swedesboro - Woodstown	County Route 605, County Route 551	Yes	
Mullica Hill and Woodstown Turnpike		March 7, 1851	Mullica Hill - Harrisonville - Eldridge Hill - Woodstown	Route 45, County Route 617	Yes	
Mullica Hill and Pittsgrove Turnpike		March 14, 1851	Mullica Hill - Pole Tavern	Route 77, County Route 630, 606	Yes	1853: Authorized to extend to Bridgeton, though not built
Mullica Hill and Pole Tavern Turnpike		March 14, 1851	Mullica Hill - Pole Tavern	County Route 581	Yes	1853: Authorized to extend to Daretown
Paterson and New York Plank Road		March 14, 1851	Paterson - Passaic - Wallington - East Rutherford - Secaucus - Hoboken	Main Street, Main Avenue, Paterson Avenue, Route 120, Paterson Plank Road	Yes	
Beverly and Mount Holly Plank Road or Turnpike		March 18, 1851	Beverly - Rancocas - Mount Holly	County Route 626	Yes	
Glassboro and Malaga Turnpike		March 18, 1851	Glassboro - Clayton - Franklinville - Malaga	Route 47	Yes	
Good Intent and Woodbury Turnpike		March 18, 1851	Good Intent - Woodbury		No	
Princeton and West Windsor Plank or McAdamized Road		March 18, 1851	Princeton - Delaware and Raritan Canal		No	
Lambertville and Flemington Plank Road		March 19, 1851	Lambertville - Ringoes - Flemington		No	
Mantua Creek and Red Bank Turnpike		March 19, 1851	Berkley - Red Bank	Grove Ave	Yes	Intended as replacement for Mullica Hill and Red Bank TP
Florence and Freehold Plank or Turnpike Road		February 19, 1852	Florence - New Lisbon		No	To be built on the path of the Delaware and Hanover Railroad, which was a reorganization of the Delaware and Atlantic Railroad. Later became the Pennsylvania Railroad's Kinkora Branch
Keyport and Middletown Turnpike		March 5, 1852	Keyport - Middletown	Route 35	No	See also the Middletown and Keyport TP
Zinc Mines Plank Road		March 10, 1852	Ogdensburg - Dover		No	
Shrewsbury Plank Road		March 19, 1852	Freehold - Colt's Neck - Red Bank		No	
Hudson and Bergen Plank Road		March 24, 1852	Bergen - Hudson - Seacaucus	Seacaucus Road, JFK Blvd, Sanford Plaza, Summit Avenue, Sip Avenue, Bergen Avenue, Old Bergen Road	Yes	1858: Authorized to extend their road south to the Jersey City-Bergen Point Plank Road
Millville and Malaga Turnpike		March 24, 1852	Millville - Vineland - Malaga	Route 47	Yes	
Pittstown and Bridgeton Turnpike		March 24, 1852	Pittstown - Centreville - Bridgeton		Yes?	
Port Elizabeth and Millville Turnpike		March 24, 1852	Port Elizabeth - Millville	Route 47	Yes	
Salem and Woodstown Turnpike		March 24, 1852	Salem - Woodstown	Route 45	Yes	
Upper Pittsgrove and Pittsgrove Turnpike		March 24, 1852	Pittsgrove - Pennytown (now Greenville)		No	
Vincentown and Mount Holly Turnpike		March 24, 1852	Vincentown - Newbold's Corner - Mt Holly	Newbold's Corner Road, Eayrestown Road	North of Newbold's Corner	Road later maintained by Mount Holly and Eayrestown TP Co.
Westville and Glassborough Turnpike		March 24, 1852	Westville - Glassboro	Route 47	Yes	
Williamstown and Good Intent Turnpike		March 24, 1852	Williamstown - Good Intent	Route 168, Route 42	Yes	
Bridgeton and Deerfield Turnpike		March 25, 1852	Bridgeton - Deerfield	County Route 606	Yes	
Camden and Atlantic Turnpike		March 25, 1852	Haddonfield - Longacoming - Tansboro - Blue Anchor - Winslow - Weymouth - Emmelsville - May's Landing		No	
Medford and Tuckerton Turnpike		March 25, 1852	Medford - Tuckerton		No	
Mount Holly and Moorestown Turnpike		March 25, 1852	Mount Holly - Moorestown	County Route 537	Yes	
Mount Holly and Pemberton Turnpike		March 26, 1852	Mount Holly - Pemberton		No	
Woodstown and Pennsgrove Turnpike		March 26, 1852	Woodstown - Penn's Grove	US 40, Route 48	Yes	
Pleasantville and Atlantic Turnpike or Plank Road		February 2, 1853	Pleasantville - Atlantic City	Old Turnpike, Turnpike Road	Yes	
Woodbury and Cross Keys Turnpike		February 9, 1853	Woodbury - Cross Keys	County Route 643, Egg Harbor Road, Hurffville-Cross Keys Road	Yes	
Beverly and Riverton Turnpike and Bridge Company		February 23, 1853	Beverly - Riverton		No	
Mount Holly and Jobstown Turnpike		February 25, 1853	Mount Holly - Jobstown	County Route 537	Yes	
Freehold and Howell Plank Road		March 1, 1853	Freehold - Howell	Route 79, U.S. Route 9, County Route 524	Yes	
Hackensack Plank Road		March 3, 1853	Hackensack - Ridgefield - Hoboken	Hudson Street, Bergen Turnpike, Edgewater Avenue, U.S. Route 1/9, Bergen Turnpike, 32nd St, Hackensack Plank Road, Clinton Street	Yes	Replaced Bergen Turnpike
Camden and Gloucester City Turnpike		March 4, 1853	Camden - Gloucester		Yes	Recharter of Woodbury-Camden TP; Repealed in 1870
Hainesport, Lumberton and Vincentown Turnpike		March 5, 1853	Hainesport - Lumberton - Vincentown	County Route 614	Yes	
Newark and Clinton Plank Road		March 9, 1853	Newark - Irvington	Clinton Ave	Yes	
Almonesson and Westville Turnpike		March 11, 1853	Westville - Almonesson	Westville-Almonesson Road		
Ramapo and Weehawken Plank Road	Main Road	March 11, 1853	Ramapo - Weehawken		No	
Ramapo and Weehawken Plank Road	Branch	March 11, 1853	Weehawken - Fort Lee		No	
Ramapo and Weehawken Plank Road	Branch	March 11, 1853	Weehawken - English Neighbourhood		No	
Florence and Keyport Plank Road		August 17, 1853	Union Beach - Morganville - Florence	County Route 39, County Route 3	No of Morganville	
White Horse Turnpike		January 27, 1854	Camden - Stratford	U.S. Route 30	Yes	
Bridgeton and Millville Turnpike		February 7, 1854	Bridgeton - Millville	Route 49	Yes	
Mount Holly, Lumberton and Medford Turnpike		February 24, 1854	Mount Holly - Lumberton - Medford	County Route 541	Yes	
Bordentown and Hornerstown Turnpike		March 3, 1854	Bordentown - Chesterfield - Hornerstown	County Route 528	No	
Cape May Turnpike		March 3, 1854	Cape May - Cape May Court House	U.S. Route 9, Route 109	Yes	
Freehold and Smithville Plank Road		March 3, 1854	Freehold - Smithville		No	
Lambertville and Ringoes Turnpike		March 3, 1854	Lambertville - Ringoes		No	
Port Monmouth and Middletown Plank Road		March 3, 1854	Port Monmouth - New Monmouth - Middletown	Church Street, New Monmouth Road	Yes	
Peapack Plank Road		March 9, 1854	Peapack - Bridgewater		No	
Crosswicks and Trenton Turnpike		March 17, 1854	Crosswicks - Trenton	Broad Street	Yes	
Hopewell and Ewing Turnpike	Main Road	March 17, 1854	Trenton - Ewing - Pennington	Route 31	Yes	
Hopewell and Ewing Turnpike	Branch	March 17, 1854	Trenton - Birmingham	Parkway Avenue, Scotch Road	Yes	
Newark and Elizabethtown Plank Road		March 17, 1854	Newark - Elizabeth		No	Reincorporated as Newark and Elizabeth Plank Road
Vincentown and Tabernacle Turnpike		March 17, 1854	Vincentown - Tabernacle		No	
Great and Little Egg Harbor Turnpike		February 19, 1855	Weymouth Station - Batsto - Tuckerton		No	
Centreton Turnpike		February 26, 1855	Centerton - Masonville	Old Centerton Turnpike, Masonville-Centerton Road	Yes	
Burlington and Jacksonville Turnpike		March 9, 1855	Burlington - Jacksonville	Burlington-Jacksonville Road	Yes	
Mount Holly and Pemberton South Turnpike		March 15, 1855	Mount Holly - Pemberton		No	
Burlington and Willingboro Turnpike		March 21, 1855	Burlington - Willingboro	Salem Road	Yes	Road made public 1870
Camden and Blackwoodtown Turnpike		March 24, 1855	Camden - Mount Ephraim - Blackwood	Route 168	Yes	Part of the Black Horse Turnpike
Columbus and Wrightstown Turnpike		March 24, 1855	Columbus - Wrightstown		No	
Lawrenceville, Berkeley and Thorofare Turnpike		March 24, 1855	Lawrenceville - Berkley - Thorofare		No	
Mount Holly and Eayrestown Turnpike		March 24, 1855	Mount Holly - Newbold's Corner		Yes	1856: Authorized to extend to Vincentown Road made public 1873
Bridgeton and Marlton Turnpike		April 5, 1855	Bridgeton - Marlton			
Bordentown and Crosswicks Turnpike	Main Road	March 3, 1856	Bordentown - Crosswicks	CR 528, Bordentown Crosswicks Road; CR 528	Yes	Extended to North Crosswicks 1857 Company folded 1901
Bordentown and Crosswicks Turnpike	Branch	March 3, 1856	Chesterfield - New Egypt		At least to Recklesstown	
Long-a-coming and Chew's Landing Turnpike		March 3, 1856	Berlin - Clementon - Chews Landing	Clementon Road, Berlin Road, Chews Landing Road	Yes	
Trenton and Allentown Turnpike		March 11, 1856	Trenton - Mercerville - Hamilton Square - Robbinsville - Allentown	Route 33, CR 526	Yes	
Bordentown and Columbus Turnpike		March 14, 1856	Bordentown - Columbus	U.S. Route 206	Yes	Extended to Chambers Corners 1857
Burlington and Columbus Turnpike		March 14, 1856	Burlington - Columbus - Tilghmans Corner		No	
Columbus and Kinkora Turnpike		March 14, 1856	Kinkora - Columbus		No	
Gravelly Ridge Turnpike		March 14, 1856	Woods Lower Mill - Woods Upper Mill			
Hackensack and Harrington Plank Road		March 14, 1856	Ridgefield Park - Teaneck - Dumont - New York		No	
Newark and Elizabeth Plank Road		March 14, 1856	Newark - Elizabeth		No	
Bordentown and Drawbridge Turnpike		March 5, 1857	Bordentown - White Horse		No	
Hoboken and Hudson River Turnpike		March 16, 1857	Bull's Ferry - Hoboken	Port Imperial Boulevard, River Road	Yes	1860: Authorized to extend their road to Tillou's Dock, now Edgewater Marina
Burlington and Mount Holly Turnpike		March 18, 1857	Burlington - Mount Holly	County Route 541	Yes	
Shrewsbury Turnpike		March 19, 1857	Red Bank - Shrewsbury - Eatontown		No	
Hightstown and Imlaystown Turnpike		March 20, 1857	Hightstown - Sharon Corner - Imlaystown		No	
Medford and Indiantown Turnpike		March 20, 1857	Medford - Shamong		No	
Millville and Buckshutem Turnpike		March 20, 1857	Millville - Buckshutem		No	
Red Bank and Tinton Falls Turnpike		March 20, 1857	Shrewsbury - Tinton Falls - Colt's Neck		No	
Freehold and Smithville Turnpike		February 26, 1858	Freehold - Smithville	County Route 537	Yes	
Winslow Turnpike		February 27, 1858	Long-a-coming - Waterford - Winslow		No	
Bridgeton and Fairfield Turnpike		March 6, 1858	Bridgeton - Fairton	Bridgeton Fairton Road	Yes	
Howell Turnpike		March 7, 1858	Freehold and Howell Turnpike - Our House Tavern, Howell		No	
Allentown and Imlaystown Turnpike		March 16, 1858	Allentown - Imlaystown	CR 526	Yes	
Burlington and Beverly Turnpike		March 16, 1858	Burlington - Beverly	County Route 543	Yes	
Florence and Jobstown Turnpike		March 16, 1858	Florence - Jobstown		No	
Lawrence Turnpike		March 18, 1858	Eight Mile Run (Shipetauken Creek) - Trenton		No	
Hightstown and Perrineville Turnpike		March 9, 1859	Hightstown - Perrineville	County Route 571, Perrineville Road	Yes	
Holmdel and Keyport Turnpike		March 9, 1859	Holmdel - Keyport	County Route 4	Yes	
Freehold and Colt's Neck Turnpike		March 15, 1859	Freehold - Colts Neck	County Route 537	Yes	
Middletown and Keyport Turnpike		March 15, 1859	Keyport - Middletown	Route 35	Yes	
Longacoming, May's Landing and Tuckerton Turnpike	Main Road	March 16, 1859	Long-a-coming - Winslow - May's Landing		No	
Longacoming, May's Landing and Tuckerton Turnpike	Branch	March 16, 1859	Winslow - Tuckerton		No	
Stockton and Newton Turnpike		March 18, 1859	Kaighn Point - Haddonfield and Camden Turnpike	Atlantic Avenue	Yes	Mentioned in the act deleting Newton Township
Moorestown and Mount Laurel Turnpike		March 23, 1859	Moorestown - Mount Laurel	Mount Laurel Road	Yes	
Upper Freehold and Millstone Turnpike		February 22, 1860	Smithville - Fillmore		No	
Trenton and Ewing Turnpike		March 17, 1860	Trenton - Birmingham	State Street, Sullivan Way, Grand Avenue	Yes	Locally known as Asylum Road
Lambertville and Rocky Hill Turnpike	Main Road	March 22, 1860	Lambertville - Rocky Hill		No	
Lambertville and Rocky Hill Turnpike	Branch	March 22, 1860	Ringoes - Ringoes Station		No	
Robertsville and Patton's Corner Turnpike		February 27, 1861	Robertsville - Patton's Corner	County Route 3	Yes	Merged with the Manalapan TP Co. to form the Manalapan and Patton's Corner TP in 1863
Holmdel and Middletown Point Turnpike		February 28, 1862	Holmdel - Matawan	Route 34	Yes	
Manalapan Turnpike		February 28, 1862	Manalapan - Robertsville		Yes	Merged with the Robertsville and Patton's Corner TP Co. to form the Manalapan and Patton's Corner TP in 1863
Englishtown Turnpike		March 11, 1862	Englishtown - Gordon's Corner		No	
Matawan and Holmdel Turnpike		March 11, 1862	Holmdel and Keyport Turnpike - Middletown Point	Bethany Road, Church Street	Yes	
Freehold and Englishtown Turnpike		March 6, 1863	Freehold - Englishtown	County Route 522	Yes	
Middlesex and Monmouth Turnpike		March 13, 1863	Old Bridge - Matawan	County Route 516	Yes	Not to be confused with the second unbuilt Middlesex and Monmouth TP
Englishtown and Millstone Turnpike		March 14, 1863	Englishtown - Bergen Mills	High Bridge Road, Iron Ore Road, Dugan's Grove Road, Route 33	Yes	
Manalapan and Freehold Turnpike		March 18, 1863	Manalapan - Freehold	Route 33; County Route 24	Yes	
Manalapan and Patton's Corner Turnpike		March 24, 1863	Manalapan - Patton's Corner - Robertsville	County Route 3	Yes	
Marlborough and Quinton's Bridge Turnpike		February 15, 1864	Marlborough - Quinton's Bridge	Route 49	Yes	
Red Bank and Holmdel Turnpike	Main Road	March 24, 1864	Red Bank - Leedsville - Holmdel	Front Street (in part)	Yes	Notable for the case "Freeholders of Monmouth County vs. Red Bank and Holmdel Turnpike Co."
Red Bank and Holmdel Turnpike	Branch	February 8, 1866	Navesink River Bridge - Middletown-Licroft Road			
Woodmancy and Barnegat Turnpike		March 29, 1864	Woodmansie - Barnegat			1867: Authorized to extend their road to Manahakwin
Eatontown and Sea Shore Turnpike		February 9, 1865	Eatontown - Long Branch - Land's End	Eatontown Boulevard, Broadway	Yes	
Red Bank and Eatontown Turnpike		February 9, 1865	Red Bank - Shrewsbury - Eatontown	Broad Street, County Route 11, Route 35	Yes	
New Brunswick and Cranbury Turnpike		February 24, 1865	New Brunswick - Cranbury - Cranbury Station	Route 171, U.S. 130, Georges Road, U.S. 130, Main Street	Yes	
Schooley's Mountain Turnpike		March 22, 1865	German Valley - Hackettstown			
Ewing and Hopewell Turnpike		March 30, 1865	Birmingham - Bear Tavern			
East Brunswick and New Brunswick Turnpike		April 6, 1865	Old Bridge - New Brunswick	Old Bridge Turnpike, Route 18	Yes	
Millville, Vineland and Carlsburg Turnpike	Main Road	April 6, 1865	Millville - Vineland		No	
Millville, Vineland and Carlsburg Turnpike	Branch	April 6, 1865	Vineland - Carlsburg		No	
Smithville and Blue Ball Turnpike	Main Road	February 7, 1866	Clayton's Corner - Turkey Blue Ball	County Route 524	No	
Smithville and Blue Ball Turnpike	Branch	April 1, 1868	Stilwell's Corner - Manalapan Turnpike		No	
Millville and Mauricetown Turnpike		February 26, 1866	Millville - Mauricetown - Dorchester		No	
Eatontown and Squan Turnpike		March 7, 1866	Eatontown - Squan Village		No	
Tinton Falls Turnpike	Main Road	March 7, 1866	Colts Neck - Tinton Falls - Shrewsbury	County Route 537, Sycamore Avenue	Yes	
Tinton Falls Turnpike	Branch	March 7, 1866	Tinton Falls - Eatontown	County Route 537	Yes	
Hightstown and Manalapanville Turnpike		March 16, 1866	Hightstown - Manalapan	Route 33	Yes	
Long Branch and Deal Turnpike		March 16, 1866	Branchport - Great Pond	Branchport Avenue, Norwood Avenue	Yes	Initially authorized to extend their turnpike to Manasquan, though repealed in 1868
Mechanicsville and Oceanville Turnpike		March 16, 1866	Mechanicsville - Oceanville - Woodley's Mill (Whale Pond Brook)	Locust Avenue, Monmouth Avenue	Yes	
Manalapanville and Perrineville Turnpike		March 21, 1866	Manalapanville - Hightstown and Perrineville Turnpike		No	
Sweetman's Lane Turnpike		March 22, 1866	Sweetman - Perrineville		No	
Farmingdale and Squankum Turnpike		March 26, 1866	Our House Tavern - Farmingdale - Squankum	County Route 524	Yes	Had right to extend to Squan Village
Freehold and Jerseyville Turnpike		March 27, 1866	Freehold - Jerseyville	Jerseyville Avenue, Route 33	Yes	
Morristown and Baskingridge Turnpike		March 27, 1866	Morristown - Basking Ridge		No	
Hightstown and Cranbury Turnpike		March 28, 1866	Hightstown - Cranbury		No	
Washington and Cranbury Turnpike		March 29, 1866	Washington - Cranbury		No	
Shiloh Turnpike		April 5, 1866	Marlborough - Shiloh - Bridgeton	Route 49	Yes	
Middletown Turnpike		April 6, 1866	Middletown - Red Bank	Route 35	Yes	Road sold to the Middletown and Red Bank Turnpike Company, though the legality of the sale was questioned
Spotswood and Old Bridge Turnpike		February 25, 1867	Spotswood - Old Bridge		No	
Leedsville and Colt's Neck Turnpike		March 6, 1867	Leedsville - Colt's Neck		No	
Port Elizabeth Turnpike		March 27, 1867	Manamuskin - Port Elizabeth		No	
Toms River and Forked River Turnpike		March 27, 1867	Tom's River - Bayville - Forked River	US 9	Yes	
Smithville and Clarksburgh Turnpike		April 3, 1867	Smithville - Clarksburg		No	
Dutch Lane and Marlboro Turnpike		April 4, 1867	Freehold - Marlboro		No	
Godwinville and Paterson McAdamized Road		April 4, 1867	Paterson - Godwinville	River Street, Maple Avenue	Yes	
Pompton and Paterson Turnpike		April 4, 1867				
New Egypt and Manchester Turnpike		April 9, 1867				
Deal and Squan Bridge Turnpike		February 20, 1868	Deal - Asbury Park - Belmar - Lake Como	Route 71		
Manalapanville and Englishtown Turnpike		March 27, 1868	Manalapan - Englishtown	County Route 527 Alternate		
Beverly and Charleston Turnpike		April 2, 1868				
Squankum and Point Pleasant		April 3, 1868				
Texas Mills and Spotswood Turnpike		April 9, 1868				
Milltown Turnpike		March 2, 1869				
Englewood Dock and Turnpike		March 16, 1869				
Navesink Turnpike		March 17, 1869				
Perrineville and Monroe Turnpike		March 24, 1869				
Long Branch and Sea Bright Turnpike		February 22, 1870	Sea Bright - Long Branch	Route 36		
Forked River and Barnegat Turnpike		February 23, 1870				
Keyport and Oak Grove Turnpike		February 23, 1870	Unbuilt	Broadway, Lloyd Road, Line Road		
Spotswood and Matchaponix Turnpike		March 10, 1870				
Elizabeth and Rahway Plank Road		March 17, 1870				
Hightstown and Allentown Turnpike		March 17, 1870				
Hightstown and Princeton Turnpike		March 17, 1870				
Hightstown and Robbinsville Turnpike		March 17, 1870				
Middletown and Holmdel Turnpike		March 17, 1870				
Bricksburg and Point Pleasant Turnpike		March 8, 1871				
Perrineville and Sweetman's Lane Turnpike		March 28, 1871		County Route 1		
Cape May Boulevard Turnpike		March 13, 1873				
Lambertville and Flemington Turnpike		April 3, 1873				
West Hoboken Roadway		April 4, 1873				
County Line Turnpike		March 10, 1874	New Brunswick - Ten Mile Run			
Hudson and Hackensack Roadway		March 10, 1874				
Ocean Beach and Squan River Turnpike		March 12, 1874				
Berlin and Haddonfield Turnpike		March 25, 1875	Berlin - Haddonfield	CR 561		
Highlands and Sea Bright Turnpike		March 25, 1875	Navesink Beach (Highlands Station) - Sea Bright	Route 36		
North Hudson Turnpike		March 28, 1899			No	Merged into the Public Service Railway Co. 1907
Ocean City and Beesley's Point Turnpike		December 6, 1882			No	
Sea Isle City Turnpike		1908	Ocean View - Sea Isle City		Yes	
Long Beach Turnpike			Manahawkin - Ship Bottom		Yes	

== Turnpikes in Name Only ==
The following is a list of roads in New Jersey that are, or have been, called turnpikes, despite there being no evidence of a company tolling the road

Name	Location	Notes
Union Turnpike	North Bergen, NJ - connecting - Bergen Turnpike - Paterson Plank Road	Part of road superseded by Paterson and New York Plank Road. Possibly not a turnpike, but a union of turnpikes
Owassa Turnpike	Frankford - Hampton Township	
Boonton Turnpike	Lincoln Park	
Newark Turnpike	Lathrop Avenue in Boonton	
Powerville Turnpike	Either Main Street in Boonton or Intervale Road	
Morris Turnpike	Randolph Township	
