= Florence and Keyport Plank Road =

Partially built plank road in New Jersey

Coordinates: 40.3765°N 74.2304°W

The Florence and Keyport Plank Road was a partially built plank road in New Jersey.

The Florence & Keyport Company was chartered in Monmouth County, New Jersey on March 1, 1850. The Florence & Keyport Joint Companies were chartered in Monmouth County on August 17, 1853; one object of the company was “the construction of and maintenance of Roads leading to and from said depots, on which said business may be done, and also to purchase and hold the stock of such Road Companies or other corporations as will extend the business of this Company and promote the object of its organization.” Intended as a toll road to run from Florence, Burlington County, on the Delaware River to a point (now Union Beach) near Keyport on Raritan Bay. The only part planked was beginning at the foot of Dock Street, Union Beach, thence up Dock to State Street (now Florence Avenue, part of County Route 39 ), thence southwest to end at Main Street, Keyport (now County Route 4. Here was as far as they got with the planked surface. It is known that the planking was proposed to continue along Clark Street to approximately Beers Street, from which it was to set off in a southwesterly direction, crossing into Hazlet and Aberdeen Townships and intersecting Lloyd Road and Church Street. From there it was to follow Lloyd Road to the Monmouth County Plank Road (the present New Jersey Route 79). The segment west of Beers Street was laid out as a public road on May 13, 1859. This road return was the subject of two caveats filed against it: One from William W. Ackerson, through whose land it was to run, and one from the Township Committee as a body. As a result, on February 23, 1860, a committee of the Monmouth County Board of Chosen Freeholders voted to quash this road return as “unnecessary and injurious." Also laid out on May 13, 1859 was that portion between the present Reid's Hill Road and New Jersey Route 79; this segment was opened to the public and became known as Lloyd Road.

== See also ==
- List of turnpikes in New Jersey
