= Manalapan and Freehold Turnpike =

Turnpike in New Jersey, US

The Manalapan and Freehold Turnpike was a turnpike in New Jersey, running west from Freehold into Manalapan Township.

The Manalapan and Freehold Turnpike was chartered on March 18, 1863 and began at the intersection of Manalapan Avenue and West Main Street, Freehold and followed Manalapan Avenue (County Route 24), New Jersey Route 33 Business and New Jersey Route 33 to the Manalapan and Patton's Corner Turnpike (present intersection of Route 33 and Woodward Road) in Manalapan. On November 17, 1886, the Manalapan and Freehold Turnpike Company purchased the western segment of the Manalapan and Patton's Corner Turnpike, which extended the route west to Manalapanville (present intersection of Route 33 and County Route 527 Alternate). On June 12, 1901 all of the 6.30-mile (10.14 km) turnpike between West Main Street, Freehold and Iron Ore Road (County Route 527 Alternate), Manalapan was purchased by the Monmouth County Board of Chosen Freeholders and incorporated into the county highway system. Much of this was later included as part of New Jersey Route 7, later New Jersey Route 33.

== See also ==
- List of turnpikes in New Jersey
