= Manalapan and Patton's Corner Turnpike =

Former turnpike in New Jersey, USA

The Manalapan and Patton's Corner Turnpike was a turnpike in New Jersey, running northeast from Manalapan Township and Marlboro Township.

The Manalapan and Patton's Corner Turnpike was chartered on March 24, 1863, as a merger of two turnpike companies: the Robertsville and Patton's Corner Turnpike Company, chartered in 1862; and the Manalapan Turnpike Company, chartered the day after. The company's road began at the present intersection of New Jersey Route 33 and County Route 527 Alternate on the boundary of Manalapan and Millstone townships. It proceeded east along present-day Route 33 to what is now the intersection of Route 33 and Woodward Road in Manalapan, where the turnpike turned north and followed what are now Woodward Road, Main Street and Tennent Road to the Monmouth County Plank Road. On November 17, 1886, the Manalapan and Freehold Turnpike Company purchased the western segment of the Manalapan and Patton's Corner Turnpike, which truncated the route at Woodward Road and Route 33. On July 10, 1901, the 5.18-mile (8.34 km) segment of turnpike within Marlboro Township was purchased by the Monmouth County Board of Chosen Freeholders and incorporated into the county highway system. It would appear that at this time the segment in Manalapan was abandoned to the township. Much of this turnpike would later be included as a part of County Route 3.

== See also ==
- List of turnpikes in New Jersey
