= Freehold and Howell Plank Road =

Former road in New Jersey, USA

Coordinates: 40.213°N 74.238°W

The Freehold and Howell Plank Road was a plank road in New Jersey, running south from Freehold into Howell Township. Its path is now roughly followed by New Jersey Route 79, U. S. Route 9 and County Route 524.

The Freehold and Howell Plank Road was chartered March 1, 1853 by an act of the New Jersey Legislature. On June 1, 1901, it was purchased by the Monmouth County Board of Chosen Freeholders and incorporated into the county highway system. Portions were later taken over as a state highway.

== See also ==
- List of turnpikes in New Jersey
