= Middlesex and Monmouth Turnpike =

Roads in New Jersey, US

Middlesex and Monmouth Turnpike was the name of two turnpikes chartered in New Jersey.

The first, chartered on March 13, 1863, was to run from the crossing of the Camden and Amboy Rail Road at Old Bridge to the Monmouth County Plank Road at Matawan. After the turnpike ceased operation, much of this route would later become a part of County Route 516.

The second was chartered on March 4, 1868, and was to run from the road "from Mount's Mills to Old Bridge" (present-day County Route 527) to the Monmouth County Plank Road at Matawan. Much of this route consisted of present-day Texas Road. This turnpike was never constructed.

== See also ==
- List of turnpikes in New Jersey
- County Route 516
- County Route 520
- County Route 690
