= Good Intent, New Jersey =

Populated place in Gloucester County, New Jersey, US

- Unincorporated community
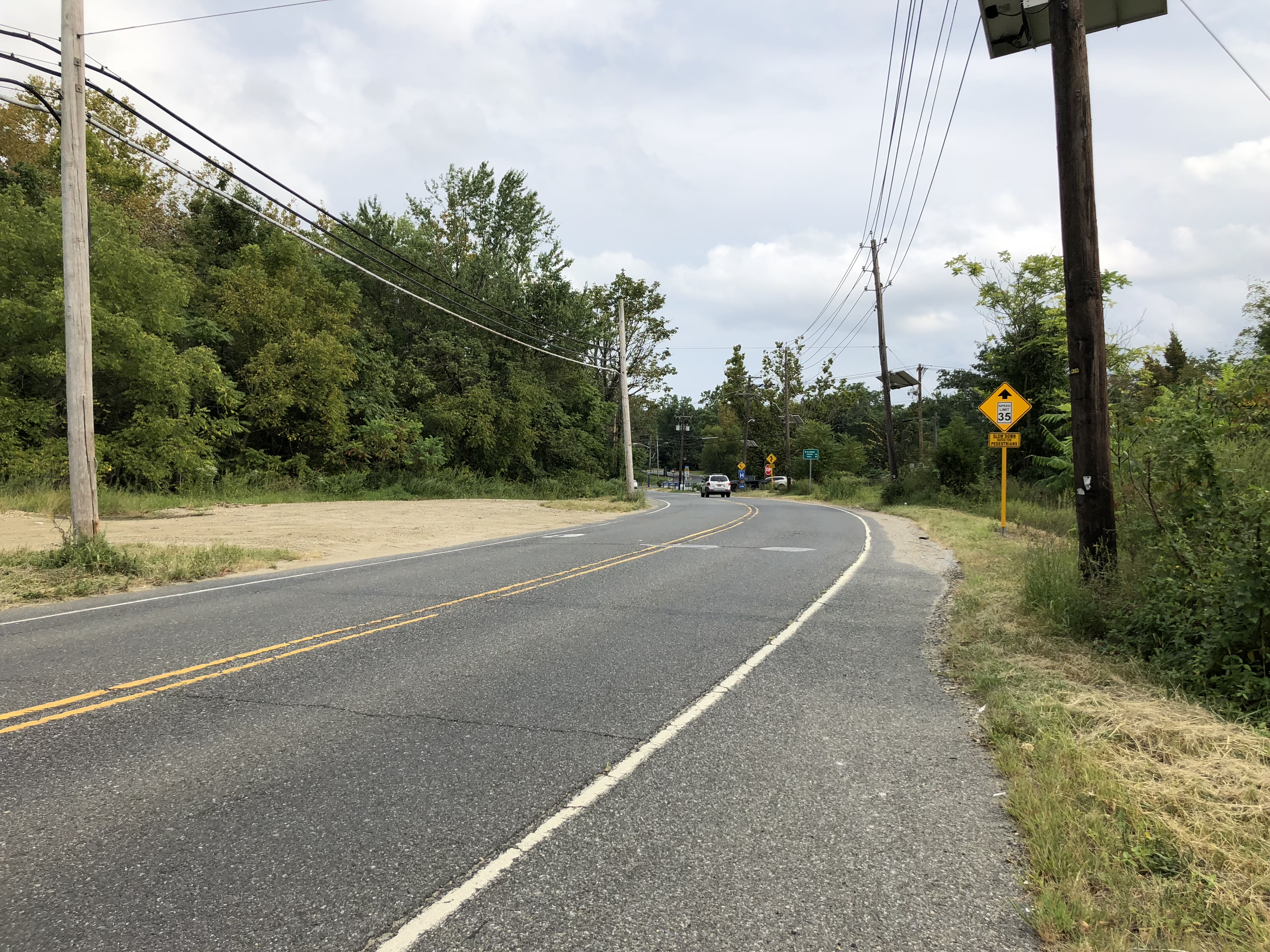
- CR 534 eastbound through Good Intent

- Location within Gloucester County, New Jersey Location within New Jersey Location within the United States
- Coordinates: 39°48′15″N 75°04′40″W
- Country: United States
- State: New Jersey
- County: Gloucester
- Township: Deptford
- Elevation: 56 ft (17 m)
- Time zone: UTC−05:00 (Eastern (EST))
  - Summer (DST): UTC−04:00 (EDT)
- GNIS feature ID: 876664

Good Intent is an unincorporated community located in Deptford Township in Gloucester County, in the U.S. state of New Jersey.

The community is located along a tributary of Big Timber Creek.

== History ==
An early settler, George Ward, purchased 250 acres (100 ha) of land at Good Intent in 1701 and erected small mills.

A cloth mill was erected in 1829. The three-story building was destroyed by fire in 1840, but was soon rebuilt. About eight years later it burned down again, and was again rebuilt. A mail stage coach began service in 1834 "to leave Good Intent every morning, Sundays excepted".

In 1836, a factory was established at Good Intent which manufactured handles for pitch forks and shovels. The raw lumber was brought in on scows, and the finished product was transported to Philadelphia.

The Good Intent Church was noted to exist during the 1840s.

An improved road to Good Intent was built from Williamstown (then called "Squankum") in 1853.
