= Little Timber Creek =

Coordinates: 39°52′53″N 75°07′37″W

Little Timber Creek is a tributary of the Delaware River, in Camden County, New Jersey, United States. It is approximately 3 miles (4.8 km) in length.

== See also ==
- Big Timber Creek
