= Holmdel and Keyport Turnpike =

Turnpike in New Jersey, United States

The Holmdel and Keyport Turnpike was a turnpike in New Jersey, running south from Holmdel Township to Keyport, between 1859–1901. It then became part of the county highway system. Since 1937, it has been part of County Route 4.

The Holmdel and Keyport Turnpike was chartered March 9, 1859. On September 14, 1892, the turnpike company abandoned that portion of Main Street in Keyport, between Front and Broad Streets, a distance of approximately 0.75-mile (1.2 km), and on June 12, 1901, the remaining 5.95 miles (9.6 km) between Broad Street and present-day County Route 520 was purchased by the Monmouth County Board of Chosen Freeholders and incorporated into the county highway system. In 1937, it became a part of County Route 4.

== See also ==
- List of turnpikes in New Jersey
