= Big Timber Creek =

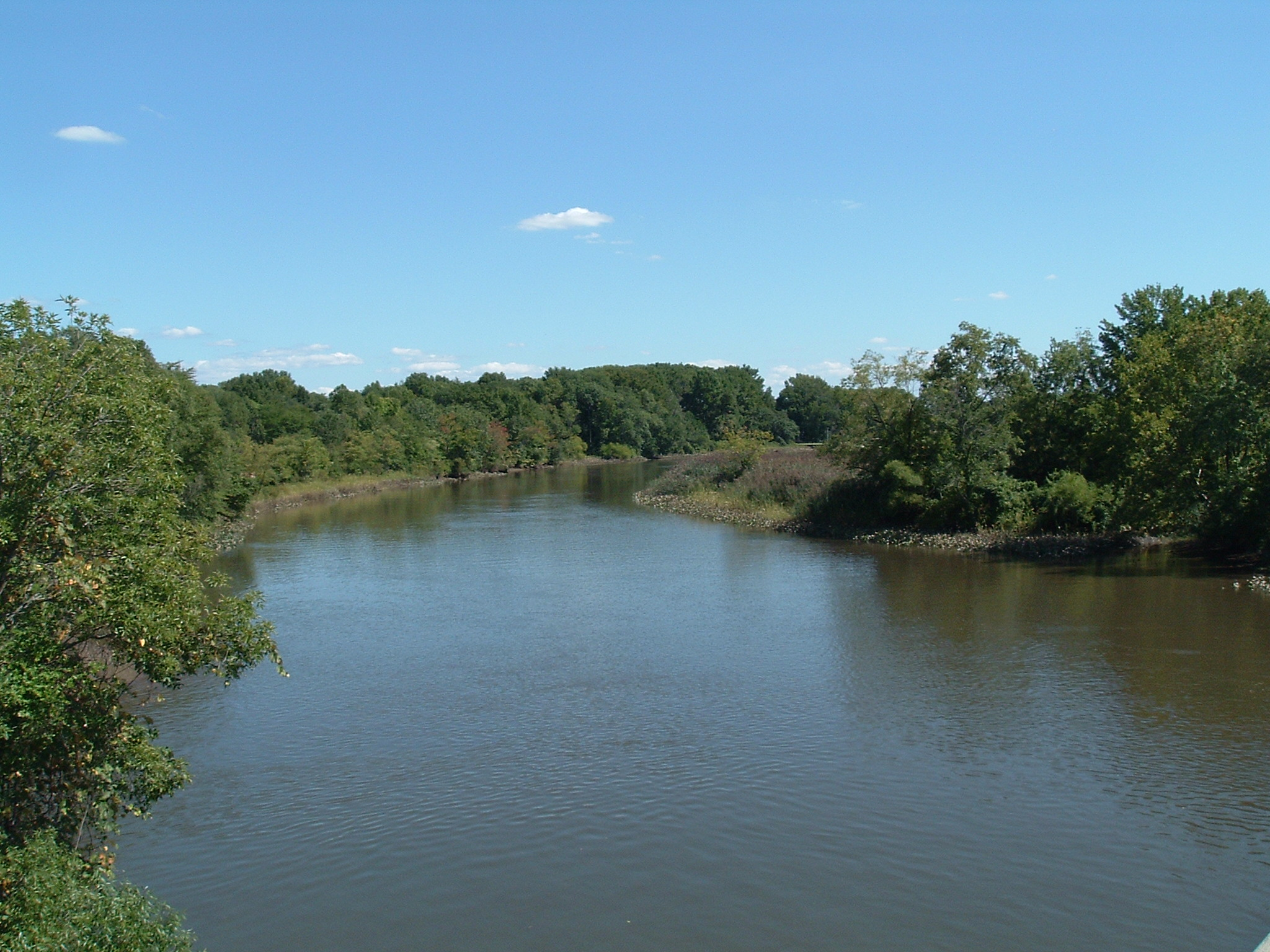
- Big Timber Creek in 2007

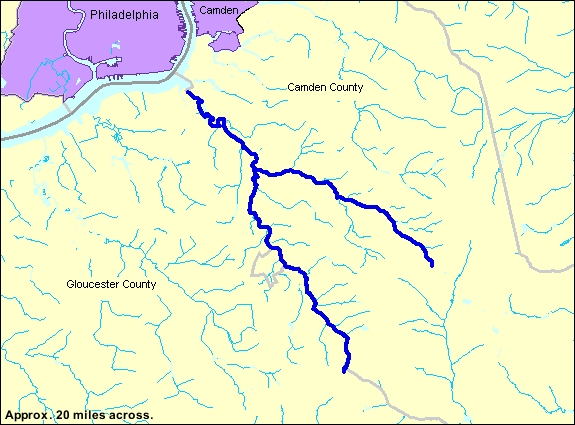
- Etymology: Dutch, Timmer Kill

Location
- Country: United States
- State: New Jersey

Physical characteristics
- Source: Big Lebanon Branch
  - location: Cross Keys, New Jersey
  - coordinates: 39°43′38″N 75°01′28″W
  - elevation: 158 ft (48 m)
- Mouth
  - location: Westville, New Jersey
  - coordinates: 39°53′05″N 75°07′59″W
  - elevation: 0 ft (0 m)
- Length: 5.6 mi (9.0 km)
- Basin size: 63 sq mi (160 km^{2})
- Discharge
  - location: Delaware River

Big Timber Creek is a 5.6-mile-long (9.0 km) stream in southwestern New Jersey. The creek was called Tetamekanchz Kyl by Lenape tribes prior to European settlement in the area. The creek drains a watershed of 63 square miles (160 km^{2}) and is a tributary of the Delaware River.

Big Timber Creek enters the Delaware River between Brooklawn and Westville, just south of Gloucester City and across from Philadelphia. The main stream and south branch form roughly half of the border between Camden and Gloucester counties.

Pre-Columbian Big Timber Creek was home to numerous villages of the Lenni Lenape. In colonial times, the creek was a commercial waterway, and it powered a multitude of mills up through the 1950s. In the second half of the 20th century, it suffered some ill effects of the rapid post–World War II development that impacted many of America's waterways. As of 2007, the creek had recovered as a result of pollution controls and improvements in sewage treatment.

== The name ==
The creek was named Tetamekanchz by the local Lenape tribe, with the North Branch named Tetamekanchz, the Chews Landing section named Arwames, Beaver Branch called Tekoke, and Little Timber Creek named Sassackon. The earliest recorded use of the current name is by an early Dutch explorer, David P. DeVries, who refers to a Timmer Kill, "Timber Creek" in Dutch, in his memoirs of his journey of 1630–1633, after the construction of Fort Nassau at its mouth. This name became anglicized when the Quakers arrived. In 1697, the West Jersey Proprietors, in creating the town of Gloucester, decreed that the name be the "Gloucester River", and although that name did appear in documents for several years, it faded away. A much smaller creek lying to the north, Little Timber Creek, finds the Delaware at the same place as its larger namesake. To differentiate between the two, the latter came to be known as "Great Timber Creek", which soon became "Big Timber Creek". Even so, at the end of the 20th century it was still usually referred to in speech as simply "Timber Creek".

== Description ==
=== Course ===
(Note: All course mileage figures are approximate river miles, not as the crow flies.)

Big Timber Creek flows roughly to the northwest. Two streams, the North Branch and the South Branch, join 5.6 miles (9.0 km) above its mouth to form the main stream. The South Branch is considered the source stream. Both branches are dammed at several points to form impoundments—no natural lakes occur along either branch.

==== South Branch ====
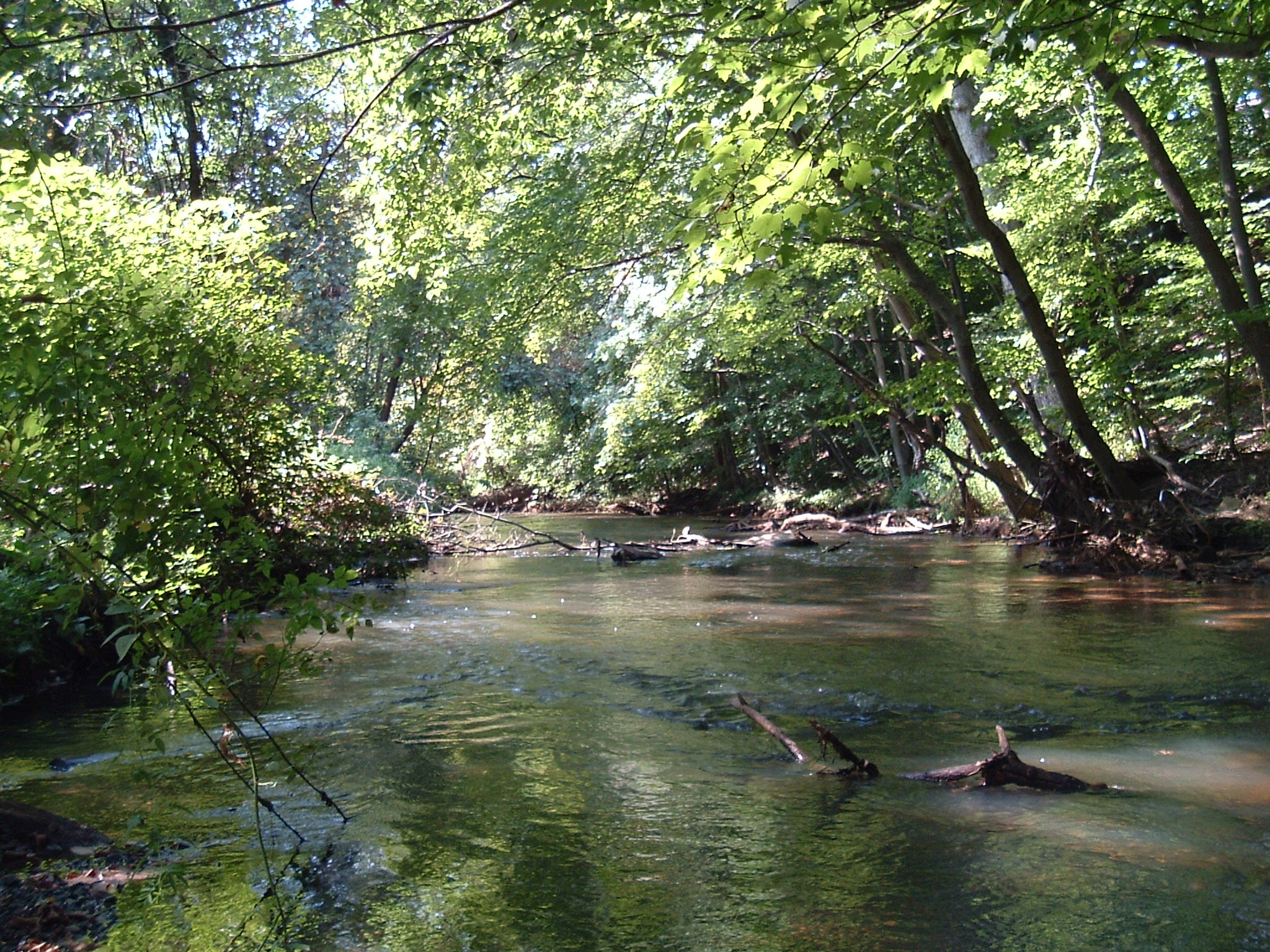
South Branch, just below Blackwood Lake, looking downstream

Two streams join to form the South Branch of Big Timber Creek, the Big Lebanon Branch and the Little Lebanon Branch.

Big Lebanon Branch is considered the source stream, as it is the longer. Indeed, it appears on some maps as "Big Timber Creek". It rises near Cross Keys in Gloucester County (under a housing development) at an elevation of about 160 feet (49 m) and flows northwesterly 2.4 miles (3.9 km), fed by several streams from the east along the way, to its confluence with the Little Lebanon Branch just above Nash's Lake in Turnersville. About one mile (1.6 km) north of its source, at the head of Jones Lake, Big Lebanon receives Long Hollow Branch. Jones Lake is formed by a dam about one-quarter of a mile (0.40 km) on and lies at an elevation of about 110 feet (33.5 m). Just beyond the dam, Chestnut Branch comes in, and Big Lebanon veers northwest to run along the south side of the Atlantic City Expressway. 0.5 miles (0.80 km) beyond Chestnut Branch it receives Slab Bridge Branch, and after another half mile, Jeremys Field Branch about 0.3 miles (0.5 km) above its confluence with Little Lebanon.

Little Lebanon Branch lies within Gloucester County. It begins at Baum Pond (in 2007, dry) at an elevation of about 135 feet (41 m) near the intersection of Stagecoach Road and the Black Horse Pike. It flows roughly north for 1.9 miles (3.1 km) to meet the Big Lebanon and with it form the South Branch of Big Timber Creek. Little Lebanon has no significant tributaries.

The South Branch proper begins just above Nash's Lake in Washington Township and runs northward for 9.1 miles (14.6 km) to the point where it joins the North Branch. It forms several impoundments and receives a number of smaller streams over its course. Just below its head, the South Branch passes under the Atlantic City Expressway to be dammed about one-third of a mile (0.54 km) down to form Nash's Lake at an elevation of 79 feet (24 m). After weaving once under the highway for about two-thirds of a mile (1.1 km), it receives Stone Bridge Branch and Toms Branch from the east in quick succession and, passing under the highway (now Route 42) to the west, it flows north for a mile to Grenloch Lake in Turnersville. Grenloch Lake lies at an elevation of 44 feet (13 m) and extends for one-half mile (0.80 km) above its dam. The lake receives Holly Run from the northeast before passing under the Black Horse Pike, whereupon Bells Lake Branch enters from the south. Below Grenloch Lake's dam, the South Branch wanders northwest for one mile (1.6 km) to Blackwood Lake in Blackwood, having picked up Gardner's Run from the southwest about halfway along. At an elevation of 18 feet (5.5 m), Blackwood Lake snakes almost a mile along the foot of an escarpment to its west. Farrows Run enters from the east about at the midpoint. About a quarter mile below the dam, two streams join the South Branch, Bull Run from the west and Minqus Run from the east. About a mile farther on, the stream grows sluggish and tidal. Another mile, and Pines Run enters from the east just after the South Branch passes under Route 42 south-to-north. Its final mile lies among wetlands and mudflats.

==== North Branch ====
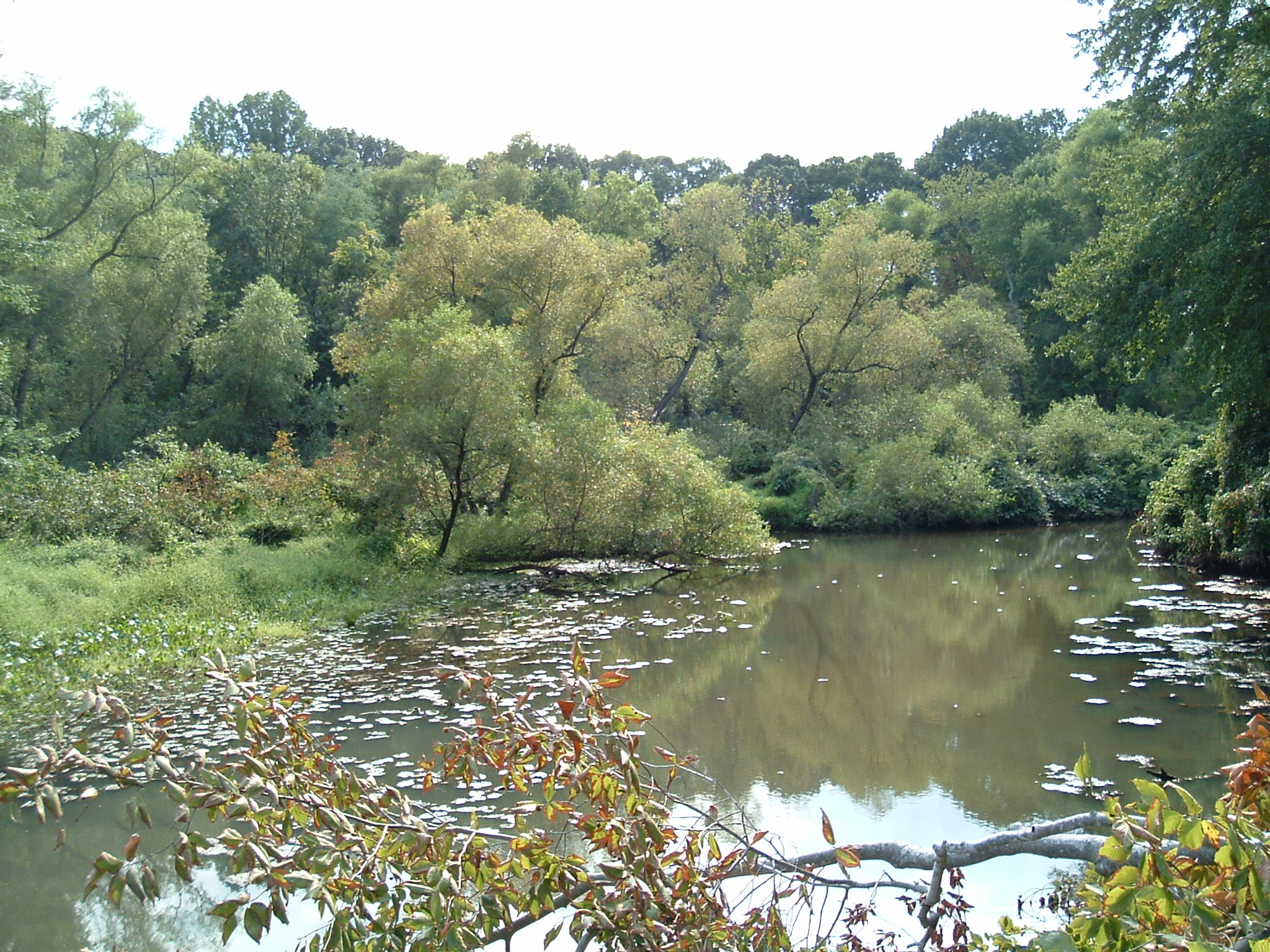
North Branch in Stratford, looking downstream

The North Branch of Big Timber Creek rises near Albion at an elevation of about 135 feet (41 m), about 2.5 miles (4.0 km) from Pine Hill (the hill, not the town, which is nearer), the highest point in southern New Jersey at about 200 feet (61 m). The North Branch flows northwestward 10.1 miles (16.3 km) through several impoundments to Chews Landing and thence to its confluence with the South Branch.

From its origin, the North Branch skirts the northern edge of the world-renowned Pine Valley Golf Club and enters Lekau Lake a mile down. A teardrop-shaped impoundment about one-third of a mile (0.54 km), Lekau Lake lies at an elevation of 76 feet (23 m) in a hollow of the hills. Leaving the lake, the North Branch twines its way a mile northwest, down to 51 feet (15.5 m), and enters Clementon Lake in Clementon, long a recreational mecca for the region. One-quarter mile (0.40 km) below the lake Trout Run enters from the east, and a half mile farther on, Gravelly Run. The North Branch then runs more to the west for a mile to Laurel Lake, a sinuous one-half-mile-long (0.80 km) impoundment which lies at an elevation of about 30 feet (9.1 m). The North Branch continues its westerly course for three-quarters of a mile (1.2 km) below Laurel Lake, turning northward where Mason Run enters from the south. It turns to the westward again after another three-quarters of a mile, immediately after which it receives Signey Run from the north. The North Branch then tends northwestward, widening and slowing a mile along, and, turning west upon receiving Otter Branch from the north a half mile farther down, enters an impoundment at Chews Landing. This impoundment is a consequence of the constriction at the point about one-third of a mile (0.54 km) down where the North Branch passes under the Black Horse Pike. The North Branch is now tidal and runs westward through wetlands another mile to its confluence with the South Branch.

==== Main stream ====
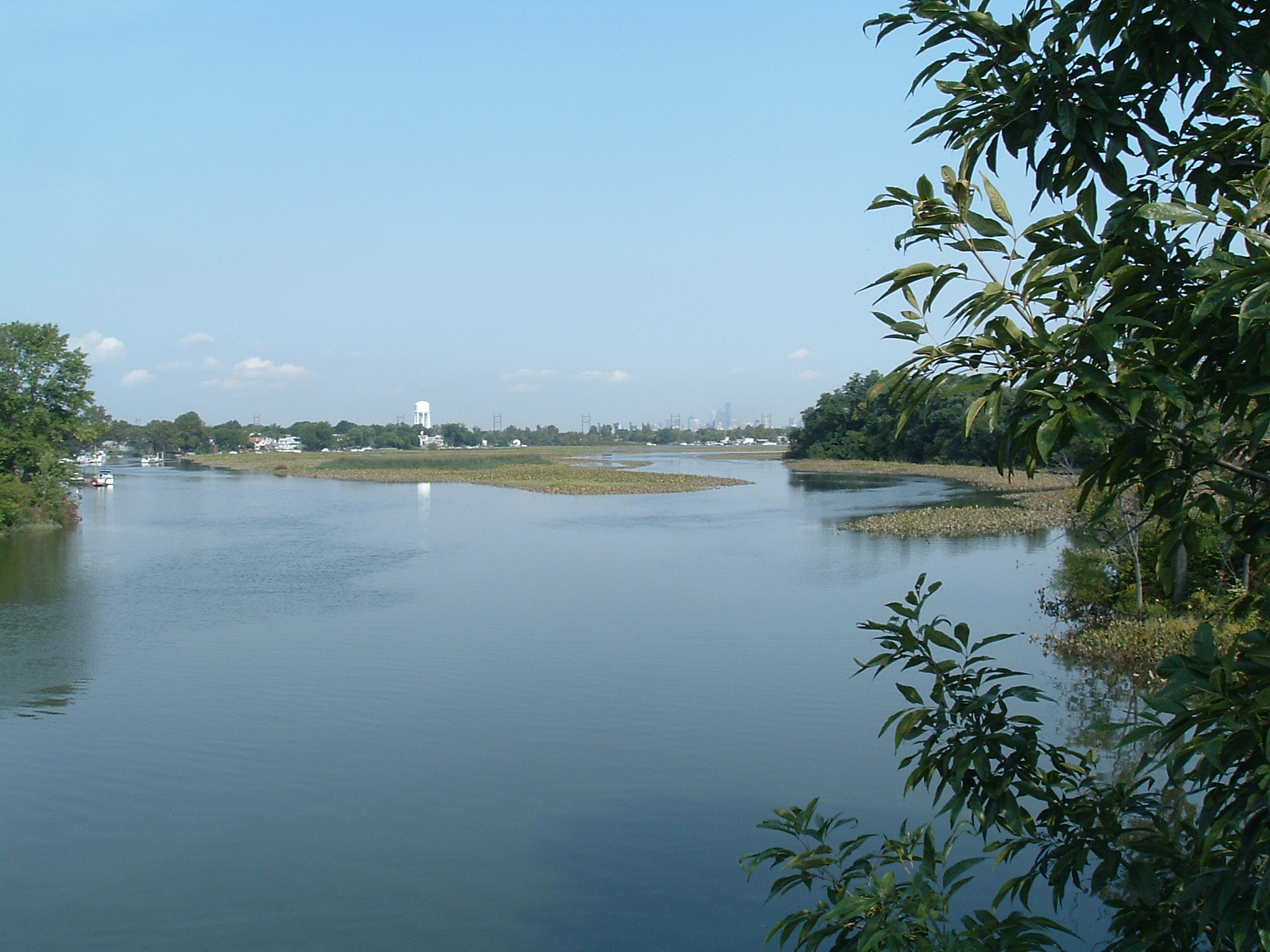
Main stream in Bellmawr, looking downstream

The main stream of Big Timber Creek begins in Glendora, just upstream from Clement's Bridge, at the confluence of the North and South branches. It meanders northwest for 5.6 miles (9.0 km) to empty into the Delaware River between Westville and Brooklawn. Over much of its length it is hemmed in by roads, old dumps, and fill. It opens out into wetlands here and there. The main stream is tidal throughout.

The first mile (1.6 km) of the main stream is essentially a ditch between a housing development and a trash dump. Three-quarters of a mile (1.2 km) downstream from its head, the main stream receives from the north the waters of Hirsch Lake in Runnemede, a smallish impoundment fed by an unnamed stream. A one-quarter mile (0.40 km) on, the left bank recedes into wetlands, and Almonesson Creek enters on the left another quarter mile down. A further one-half mile (0.80 km) sees Beaver Brook enter on the right, and the stream narrows again as it passes under Route 42 and the New Jersey Turnpike. It remains confined for the next mile and a half (2.4 km), receiving Ladd's Branch on the left at one mile and flowing another half mile to pass under Route 295, shortly after which it opens out into three-quarters of a mile of wetlands crossed by navigable channels. The stream forms three channels here, the main one hugging the left bank by Westville. The rightmost channel flows through the borough of Bellmawr and has several small marinas and private docks located along its banks. The creek then flows another three-quarters of a mile under State Route 47, through Michael K. Galbraith Park in Westville, finally opening up into a shallow bay and flowing into the Delaware River.

=== The land ===
==== Geology ====
Big Timber Creek lies wholly within the Atlantic Coastal Plain Physiographic Province, specifically that portion known as the Inner Coastal Plain. The coastal plain is a wedge-shaped mass of sediments, mostly unconsolidated, lying upon Precambrian basement rock. It extends from the Fall Line out onto the continental shelf, thickening as it goes at the rate of 80 to 100 feet per mile (15–19 m/km).

New Jersey's inner coastal plain is defined by a cuesta that runs through the coastal plain roughly northeast to southwest across the middle and southern parts of the state. This cuesta marks the transition between the underlying Cretaceous sediments toward the Piedmont and the more recent Miocene sediments seaward and is itself Cretaceous in origin. In its southern reaches, where Big Timber Creek lies, it runs roughly parallel to the Delaware River at a distance of about 20 miles (32 km) and delineates the left edge of the Delaware River watershed in southern New Jersey.

The surficial geology of the New Jersey inner coastal plain is among the most complex in the world. At least eight of the 14 or 15 sedimentary strata, or formations, laid down since the Cretaceous period appear at the surface in the Big Timber Creek basin. Each formation is itself made up of many layers, some the result of irregular interglacial stream deposition. The situation is further complicated by the appearance of fragments of older formations at a shallower level than more recent ones, owing to cycles of deposition and erosion; in fact, the so-called Bridgeton formation, the oldest, containing iron-indurated sand, forms the summits of the few prominences on the landscape. Generally speaking, the surface of the area is weathered Cretaceous coastal plain consisting of quartz sand, with patches where gravel or clay are found. Glauconite occurs in varying concentrations in the younger formations, and some bog iron is seen. There is no rock, though some iron-bearing sand has become concreted and rock-like.

==== Geography ====
Big Timber Creek dissects the inner coastal plain in the dendritic pattern characteristic of streams flowing over soft materials. It has been cutting down through sand, clay, and gravel since the retreat of the last of the Pleistocene marine inundations which deposited fresh layers of sediment. Big Timber Creek's watershed encompasses 63 square miles (160 km^{2}), including Little Timber Creek, a small creek that shares its mouth. The sides of the basin are defined by the patchy remains of relatively erosion-resistant formations. Nowhere in its basin does the relief exceed 200 feet (61 m), and much lies below 50 feet (15 m). What relief there is entirely due to erosion, mostly by Big Timber Creek and its tributaries.

The terrain consists mainly of a jumble of the low, flattened ridges typical of mature sandy basins. The scattered prominences of 100 feet (30 m) or more, some quite steep, owe their existence to caps of iron-rich sand. A cuesta forms escarpments beyond the headwaters of the Creek and along some of its southerly tributaries. There is a small, marshy floodplain in the lower reaches.

== See also ==
- List of New Jersey rivers
