= New Jersey Route 33 =

State highway in central New Jersey, US

Route 33
- Route 33 highlighted in red; Route 33 Business highlighted in blue

Route information
- Maintained by NJDOT and the City of Trenton
- Length: 42.03 mi (67.64 km)
- Existed: 1927–present

Major junctions
- West end: US 1 / Route 129 in Trenton
- I-295 in Hamilton Township; US 130 in Robbinsville Township; Route 133 in East Windsor; US 9 / Route 79 in Freehold Township; Route 34 in Howell Township; Route 66 in Tinton Falls; G.S. Parkway in Tinton Falls; Route 18 in Neptune Township; Route 35 in Neptune
- East end: Route 71 in Neptune Township

Location
- Country: United States
- State: New Jersey
- Counties: Mercer, Middlesex, Monmouth

Highway system
- New Jersey State Highway Routes; Interstate; US; State; Scenic Byways
← Route 32	→ Route 33A

Route 33 is a state highway in the central part of the US state of New Jersey. The highway extends 42.03 miles (67.64 km), from an interchange with U.S. Route 1 (US 1) in Trenton, Mercer County, east to an intersection of Main Street (Route 71) in Neptune, Monmouth County. Route 33 is a major route through Central New Jersey, as it runs from the greater state capital area in the Delaware Valley Region, through a mixture of farmland, housing, and commercial developments in the lower Raritan Valley Region, en route to the greater Asbury Park area on the Jersey Shore. The route traverses through historic towns such as Hightstown, Monroe Township, Manalapan, Freehold, and Tinton Falls. There are several intersections on Route 33 with future developments.

Route 33 begins in Trenton as a two-lane residential street. It passes through central Mercer County, joining northbound US 130 in Robbinsville. It leaves the U.S. Highway in East Windsor and becomes a local town road into the borough of Hightstown. It turns east again as it passes the east end of the Route 133, where it becomes an arterial road with four lanes as it makes its way through Monmouth County toward the shore. Around the greater "Freeholds area", it becomes a freeway. It then crosses the Garden State Parkway's exit 100 in Tinton Falls and Route 18 in Neptune. Here, it is locally known as Corlies Avenue. Route 33 ends at Route 71 in Neptune. It has two concurrencies along the route, one with Route 34 and the second with US 130. It roughly parallels Interstate 195 (I-195), located further to the south.

== Route description ==
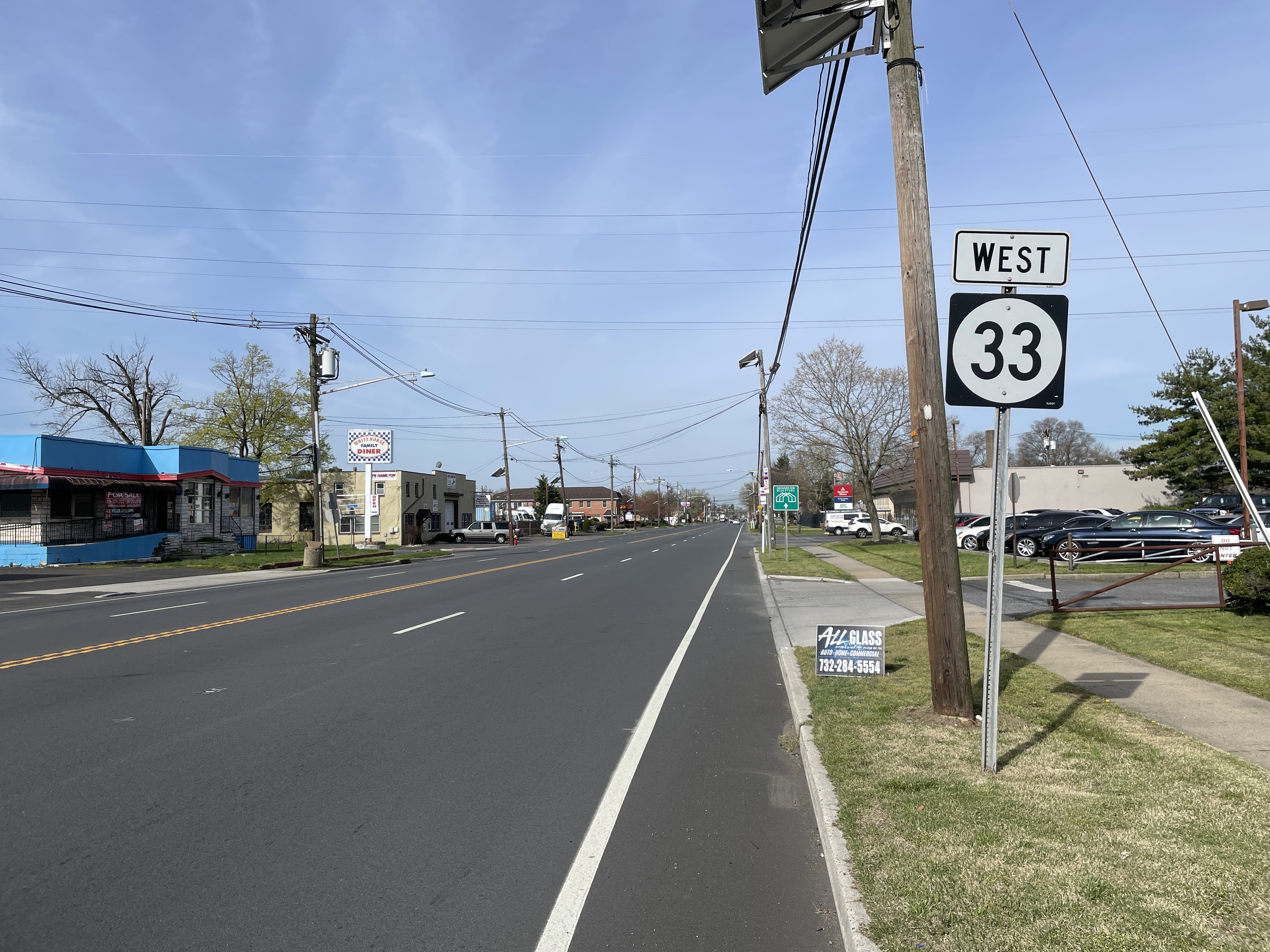
Route 33 westbound past I-295 in Hamilton Township

Route 33 begins at an interchange with US 1 in the state capital of Trenton, Mercer County; the interchange also includes a ramp from westbound Route 33 to southbound Route 129 at that route's northern terminus at a partial interchange with US 1. The route heads southeast on Market Street as a four-lane divided highway, passing over NJ Transit's River Line and Amtrak's Northeast Corridor railroad line, just south of the Trenton Transit Center serving Amtrak, NJ Transit's Northeast Corridor Line and River Line, and SEPTA's Trenton Line. After intersecting with South Clinton Avenue, Route 33 becomes Greenwood Avenue and heads east as a two-lane residential street on the east side of the city, passing north of Trenton Central High School and serving a few small businesses. Greenwood Avenue then enters Hamilton and enters a slightly more commercialized area before passing north of a cemetery. At this point, Greenwood Avenue ends, and Route 33 merges with Nottingham Way and becomes a four-lane boulevard lined with many homes and businesses. After reaching a modified interchange with I-295, Route 33 turns right off of Nottingham Way and becomes a two-lane surface road with a center left-turn lane. The route passes many business and crosses through a wooded residential area before coming back into a commercial area and entering Robbinsville, where Route 33 turns northeast onto US 130 and the two routes run concurrently on a four-lane arterial road.

US 130/Route 33 passes through a wooded area with several business lining the route before entering East Windsor, where Route 33 splits off from US 130 onto two-lane Mercer Street while US 130 continues north-northeast. The road passes through woods before emerging into Hightstown, where it serves several businesses and bisects a cemetery before entering the downtown area. Here, Mercer Street ends, and Route 33 runs northeast along Main Street before turning right onto Franklin Street and coming back into East Windsor. The route becomes a four-lane arterial road as it passes under the New Jersey Turnpike (I-95) and becomes a divided highway, reaching an interchange with Route 133, which serves the turnpike.

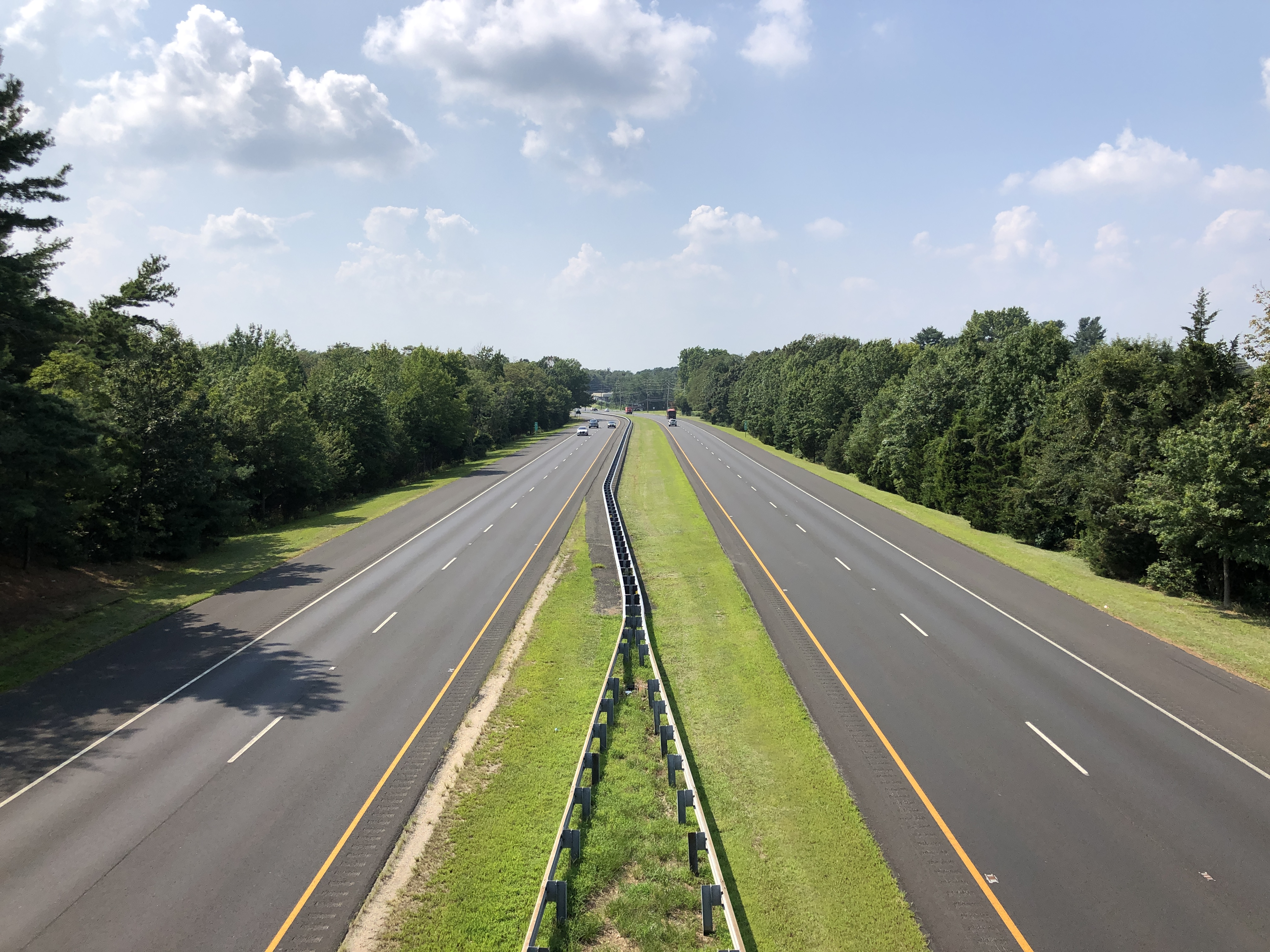
Route 33 westbound at the Route 33 Bus. interchange at the west end of the Freehold Bypass in Manalapan Township

After the intersection of Twin Rivers Drive/Twin Rivers Drive North, Route 33 enters Monroe Township, Middlesex County, where it serves many residential communities. Continuing east, activity along the sides of the highway disappears, and the route enters Millstone Township, Monmouth County, where businesses begin to reappear. Crossing into Manalapan, Route 33 passes through a mix of farmland and commercial areas before reaching the western terminus of Bus. Route 33, an old alignment of Route 33. At this point, Route 33 becomes a four-lane freeway and enters Freehold Township. The freeway passes south of Freehold Raceway Mall and bypasses Freehold, reaching interchanges with CR 537 and US 9 at the southern terminus of Route 79. Heading into more rural areas, Route 33 becomes a two-lane freeway and enters Howell and passes over the Freehold Industrial Track railroad line operated by the Delaware and Raritan River Railroad before it meets the eastern terminus of Bus. Route 33 as the freeway ends.

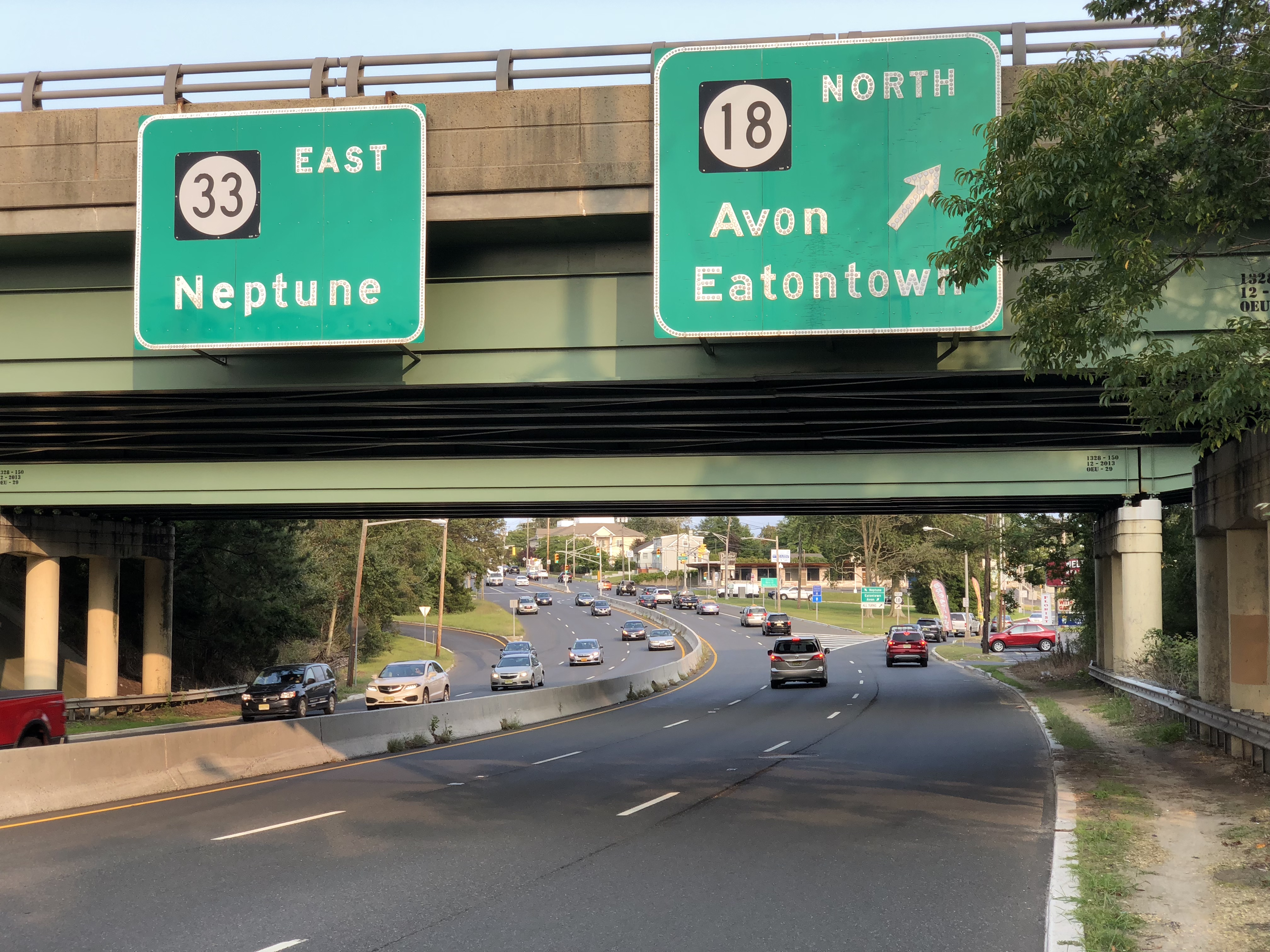
Route 33 eastbound at the Route 18 interchange in Neptune Township

Now a two-lane surface road, Route 33 passes through a largely wooded area south of Naval Weapons Station Earle and serves several businesses and residential neighborhoods before merging with Route 34 and becoming a four-lane arterial road. The two routes run concurrently and pass over the Southern Secondary railroad line operated by the Delaware and Raritan River Railroad before entering Wall Township, where several businesses line the route. At Collingwood Circle, Route 34 splits from Route 33, and the latter continues east as a four-lane undivided surface road while Route 34 continues southeast and enters Tinton Falls. The westbound and eastbound lanes eventually split apart as the highway reaches the western terminus of Route 66 and an interchange with the Garden State Parkway. Past this point, Route 33 becomes Corlies Avenue and enters Neptune, passing through many residential neighborhoods. After an interchange with Route 18, Route 33 forms the border between Neptune to the north and Neptune City to the south. The road then crosses entirely back into Neptune and passes south of Jersey Shore University Medical Center and K. Hovnanian Children's Hospital. After an intersection of Route 35, Route 33 becomes to a two-lane surface road with a center left-turn lane before crossing NJ Transit's North Jersey Coast Line and reaching its eastern terminus at the intersection of Main Street Route 71.

== History ==
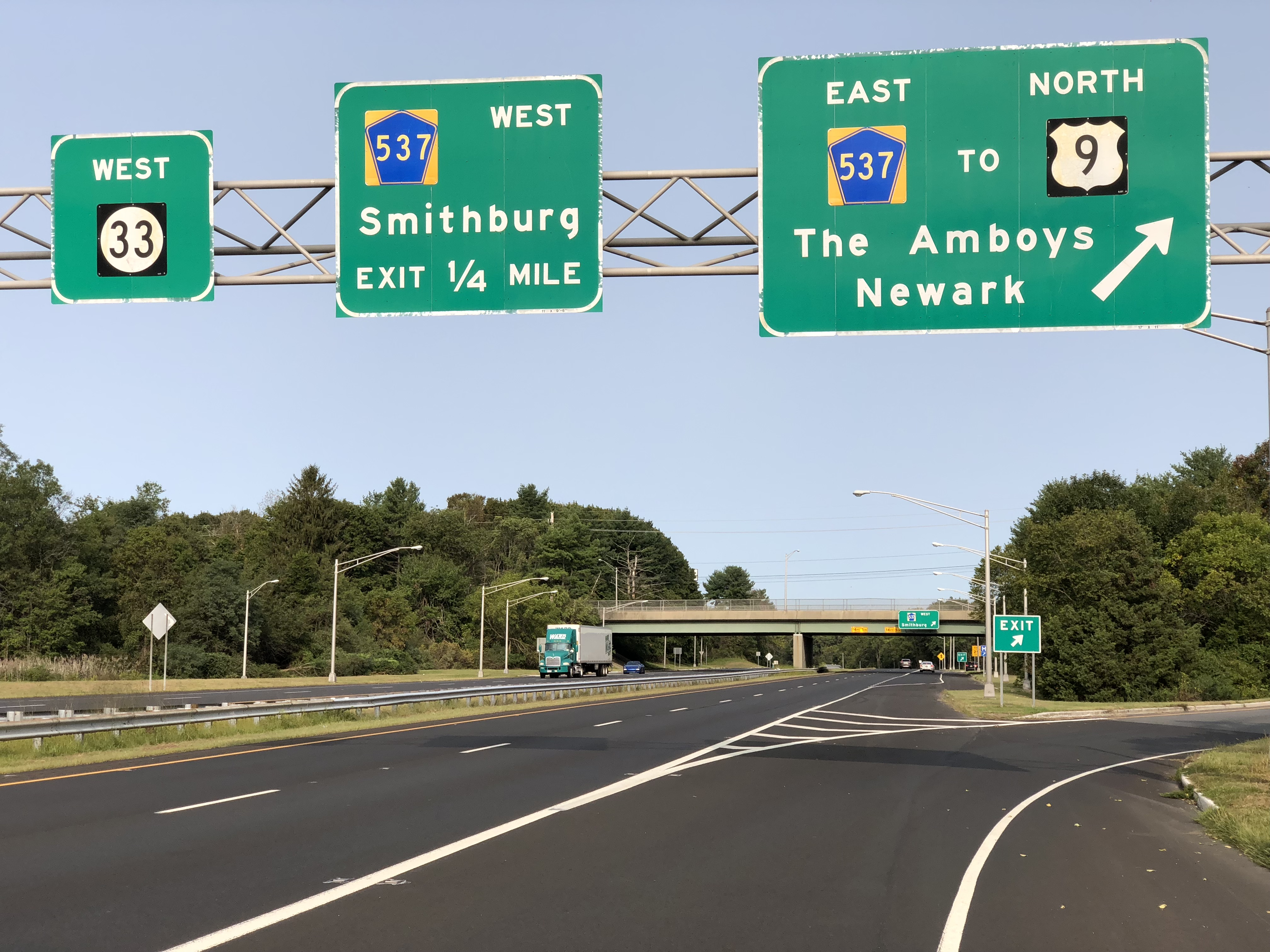
Route 33 westbound at CR 537, on the older four-lane Freehold Bypass

West of Robbinsville, the road was maintained by the Trenton and Allentown Turnpike, which was chartered in 1856; east of Robbinsville, the turnpike followed modern-day CR 526 to Allentown. From the border of Manalapan and Millstone townships east to the intersection with Woodward Road, the road was maintained by the Manalapan and Patton's Corner Turnpike; the road from there to Freehold was maintained as the Freehold and Manalapan Turnpike, chartered in 1858. The Freehold and Manalapan bought the portion of the Manalapan and Patton's Corner now signed Route 33. In addition, a small portion of the Englishtown and Millstone Turnpike was built along Route 33 from CR 527A west to Millstone Road, though this was overtaken in the construction of the Freehold and Manalapan Turnpike, chartered in 1866 to connect Freehold and Manalapan. From Freehold to Jerseyville, what is now Bus. Route 33 was maintained by the Freehold and Jerseyville Turnpike, chartered in 1866.

Route 33 originally was part of two auto trails: the Cranbury Trail, an alternative to the Lincoln Trail running from New Brunswick to Trenton; and the Jersey Link, running from Hightstown to Ocean Grove. These routes were incorporated in 1916 into two new routes: Route 1 in parts of the road south of Hightstown, and Route 7 from Hightstown to its terminus at Route 71. Both roads were changed into Route 33 in the 1927 New Jersey state highway renumbering.

Route 33 was originally planned as a freeway from US 1 in Trenton across New Jersey to Route 18 in Neptune. However, in 1967, the New Jersey Department of Transportation scaled back proposals to the current seven-mile (11 km) Route 33. Route 33 from near CR 527 in Manalapan to Halls Mill Road in Freehold Township was completed and opened in segments from 1971 to 1988.

Route 33 has three abandoned segments. The first of these is the cloverleaf ramp from Route 79 southbound to Route 33 eastbound. It has been mostly demolished to make way for a new reverse jughandle for US 9 northbound to Schanck Road. The merging part of the ramp still remains abandoned along the right side of the eastbound freeway.

The original alignment for the freeway east of Halls Mill Road (CR 55) can be seen now as a New Jersey Department of Transportation maintenance shed. The new alignment curves to the left after the interchange, in order to avoid what the New Jersey Department of Transportation believed to be a suspected (but never identified) turtle bog habitat. The pavement is accessible from the eastbound on-ramp, but is fenced off.

Up until late 1988, Route 33 westbound ran underneath US 130, then merged with US 130's southbound lanes. This was because Route 33 ran parallel to Pennsylvania Railroad Camden & Amboy route at that point, requiring a massive concrete overpass. (Route 33 eastbound also ascended the bridge approach about halfway before branching off like an exit ramp—a sign with flashing lights read "Hightstown, Shore Points" at the fork.) Pennsylvania Railroad abandoned the Hightstown–Windsor segment in 1967, reducing the importance of the hulking bridge. The New Jersey Department of Transportation eventually demolished the crumbling structure in 1989. Route 33 now meets US 130 at the north end of the overlap with a traffic signal.

In 2001, the Freehold Bypass was designated as the Theodore J. Narozanick Highway.

The remainder of Route 33 east to Fairfield Road/Brickyard Road in Howell was not completed until 2003. The project cost $33.7 million in 2003 (equivalent to $54.9 million in 2024).

Until 2003, the intersection of US 130/Route 33 in Robbinsville was configured as an at-grade wye interchange, employing curved ramps for the directional movements. The junction has since been modified to a signalized intersection with ordinary turning lanes.

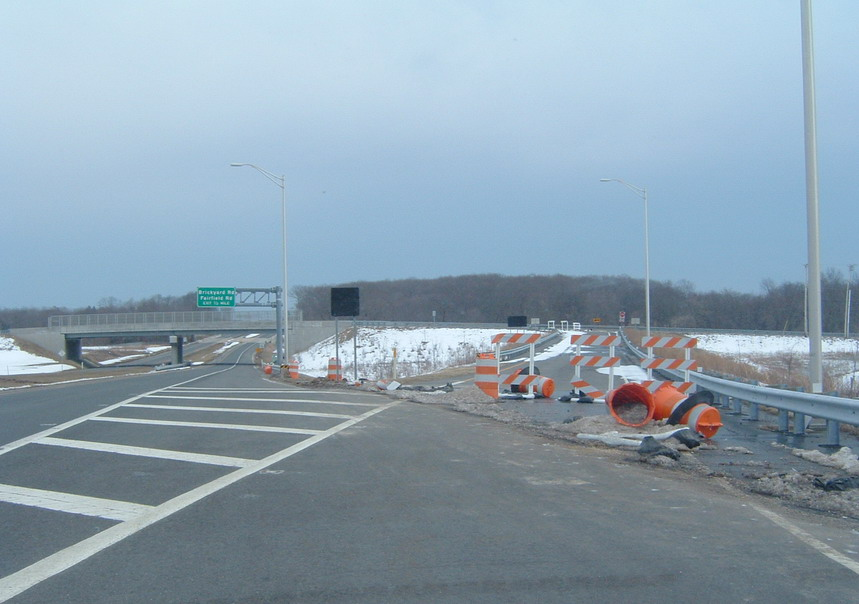
Route 33 eastbound at the Howell Road exit ramp, which has been abandoned

The eastbound Howell Road exit ramp, which began construction in 2003, was found to be incorrectly placed, possibly confusing drivers on Howell Road. An attempt was made to realign the ramp, but this failed, and the exit was abandoned shortly after, and is inaccessible and rarely maintained. Because of this, the ramp is barricaded off, slowly decaying.

A bridge once carried Route 33 over the same Pennsylvania Railroad (now Conrail Shared Assets Operations) line further south in Robbinsville. The New Jersey Department of Transportation replaced the overpass with a wider, linear roadway in 2009. As the Conrail Shared Assets Operations line was dormant, no railroad street crossing was installed. Trackage was dismantled two years later in 2011 in between Robbinsville and East Windsor.

The interchange with US 130 was rebuilt from a T-intersection to a four-way in 2009, with the construction of a new road on the southeast side of US 130.

On December 31, 2006, the New Jersey Turnpike Authority released its proposals regarding exit 8 on the New Jersey Turnpike. The old exit 8 was to be demolished and replaced with a new interchange. The new exit 8 would end at the intersection with Route 33, Milford Road, and Route 133 (on the east side of the expressway, instead of the west). This new exit 8 would grant direct access to the bypass (without going through any traffic lights), as well as to Route 33, using grade-separated interchanges. The new toll gate was to feature a total of 10 lanes at the new facility. The new interchange opened in January 2013.

== Major intersections ==
County	Location	mi	km	Destinations	Notes
Mercer	Trenton	0.00	0.00	US 1 / Route 129 south – Princeton, New Brunswick, New York, Morrisville, Philadelphia	Interchange; western terminus
Mercer	Hamilton Township	3.32	5.34	I-295 south to I-95 Toll / N.J. Turnpike	Exits 63A-B on I-295
Mercer	Hamilton Township	4.07	6.55	CR 533 (White Horse–Mercerville Road) to I-295 north – Princeton, Bordentown	
Mercer	Robbinsville Township	7.50– 7.53	12.07– 12.12	CR 526 west (Robbinsville–Edinburg Road) – Princeton	Western end of CR 526 concurrency
Mercer	Robbinsville Township	7.84	12.62	US 130 south to I-95 Toll / N.J. Turnpike CR 526 east (Robbinsville By-Pass) – Allentown	Western end of US 130 concurrency; eastern end of CR 526 concurrency
Mercer	East Windsor	12.39	19.94	US 130 north	Eastern end of US 130 concurrency
Mercer	Hightstown	14.15	22.77	CR 539 south / CR 571 east (South Main Street)	Western end of CR 539/CR 571 concurrency
Mercer	Hightstown	14.21	22.87	CR 571 west (Stockton Street)	Eastern end of CR 571 concurrency
Mercer	Hightstown	14.28	22.98	CR 539 north (North Main Street) – Cranbury	Eastern end of CR 539 concurrency
Mercer	East Windsor	15.52	24.98	Route 133 to I-95 Toll / N.J. Turnpike / US 130 – East Windsor, Princeton	Interchange; Route 133 east not signed
Middlesex	No major junctions				
Monmouth	Millstone Township	21.10	33.96	CR 527A (Iron Ore Road, Woodville Road) – Englishtown, Smithburg	
Monmouth	Manalapan Township	24.01	38.64	CR 527 (Millhurst Road, Sweetmans Lane) – Tennent, Englishtown, Perrineville	
Monmouth	Manalapan Township	24.40– 24.68	39.27– 39.72	Western end of freeway section	
Monmouth	Manalapan Township	24.40– 24.68	39.27– 39.72	Route 33 Bus. east to US 9 north – Freehold	Eastbound exit and westbound entrance; western terminus of Route 33 Bus.
Monmouth	Freehold Township	25.68	41.33	CR 537 west – Smithburg	Eastbound exit and westbound entrance
Monmouth	Freehold Township	25.68	41.33	Wemrock Road – Monmouth Battlefield State Park	Westbound exit and eastbound entrance
Monmouth	Freehold Township	26.59	42.79	CR 537 to US 9 north – Smithburg, Freehold, The Amboys, Newark	No eastbound access to CR 537 west
Monmouth	Freehold Township	27.54	44.32	US 9 south to Route 79 – Lakewood	Route 79 not signed westbound
Monmouth	Freehold Township	27.69	44.56	Route 79 north – Freehold	No eastbound exit
Monmouth	Freehold Township	29.04	46.74	Halls Mill Road (CR 55) – Adelphia	
Monmouth	Howell Township	30.04	48.34	Howell Road	Westbound entrance only; eastbound exit permanently inaccessible
Monmouth	Howell Township	30.64	49.31	Brickyard Road / Fairfield Road	Eastbound exit and westbound entrance
Monmouth	Howell Township	30.87	49.68	Route 33 Bus. west – Freehold Business District	Westbound exit and eastbound entrance; eastern terminus of Route 33 Bus.
Monmouth	Howell Township	30.87	49.68	Eastern end of freeway section	
Monmouth	Howell Township	34.77	55.96	Route 34 north to Route 18 – Matawan, New York	Western end of Route 34 concurrency; interchange; westbound exit and eastbound entrance
Monmouth	Wall Township	35.76– 35.85	57.55– 57.69	Route 34 south – Brielle CR 547 south – Farmingdale	Eastern end of Route 34 concurrency; western end of CR 547 concurrency; Collingwood Circle
Monmouth	Wall Township	36.03	57.98	CR 547 north (Shafto Road) – Eatontown	Eastern end of CR 547 concurrency
Monmouth	Tinton Falls	37.16	59.80	Route 66 east to Premium Outlets Boulevard – Asbury Park	Western terminus of Route 66
Monmouth	Tinton Falls	37.47– 37.58	60.30– 60.48	G.S. Parkway	No westbound access to GSP south; exit 100A on G.S. Parkway
Monmouth	Neptune Township	40.01– 40.03	64.39– 64.42	Route 18 – Avon-by-the-Sea, Eatontown, Evans Area, Point Pleasant	Exits 8A-B on Route 18
Monmouth	Neptune Township	41.38	66.59	Route 35 – Eatontown, Belmar	
Monmouth	Neptune Township	42.03	67.64	Route 71 (Main Street) – Asbury Park, Bradley Beach	Eastern terminus
1.000 mi = 1.609 km; 1.000 km = 0.621 mi: Concurrency terminus; Incomplete access; Tolled

== Business route ==
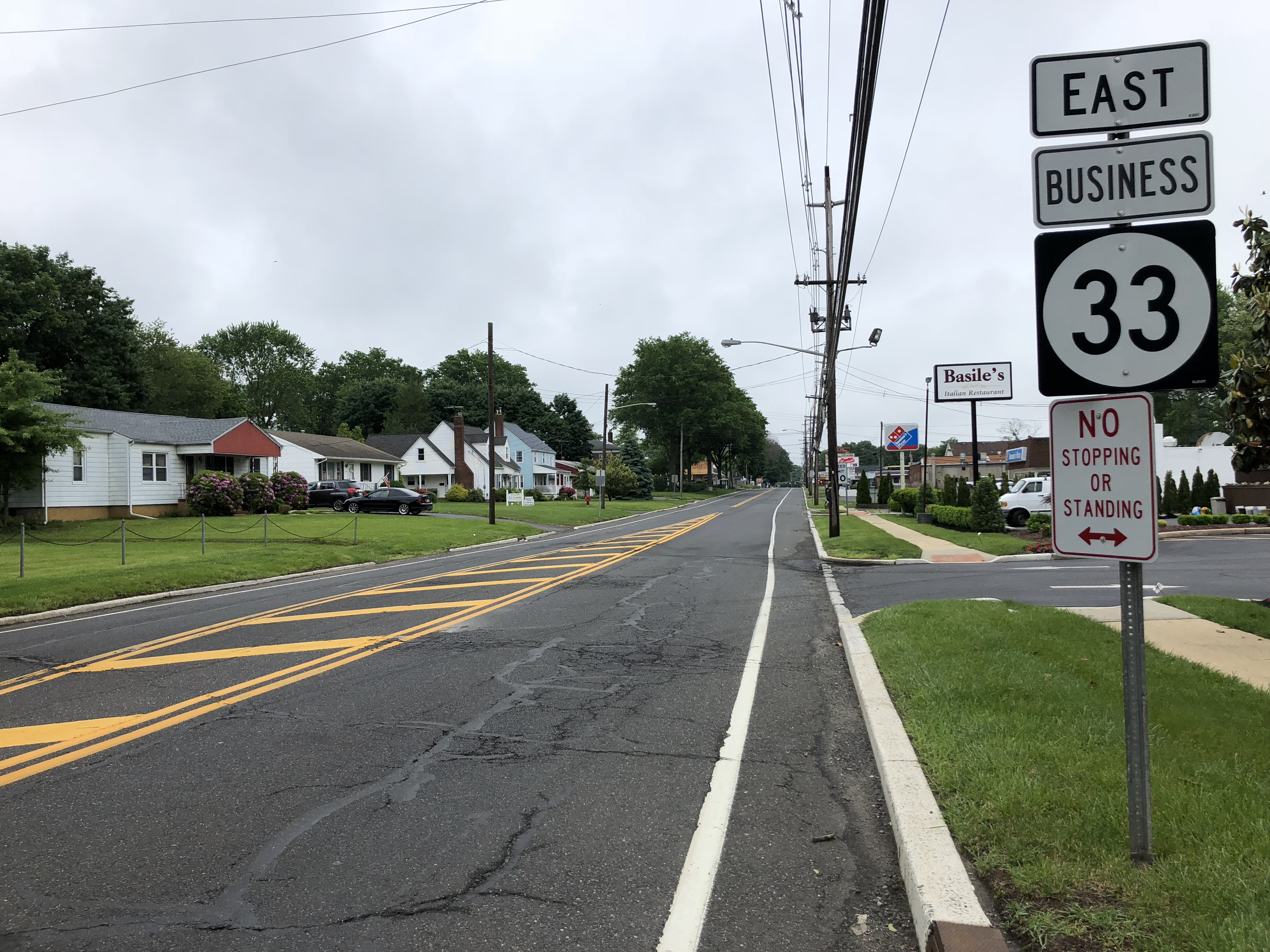
View east along Route 33 Business at Route 79 in Freehold

Route 33 Business
- Location: Freehold
- Length: 6.89 mi (11.09 km)
- Existed: 1990–present

Route 33 Business (Route 33 Bus.) is a short state highway in New Jersey that was the original alignment of Route 33 before a freeway was built as a bypass of Freehold. This business route stretches 6.8 miles (10.9 km) through Manalapan, Freehold Township, Freehold, and Howell. The highway is also the only business route state highway in New Jersey.

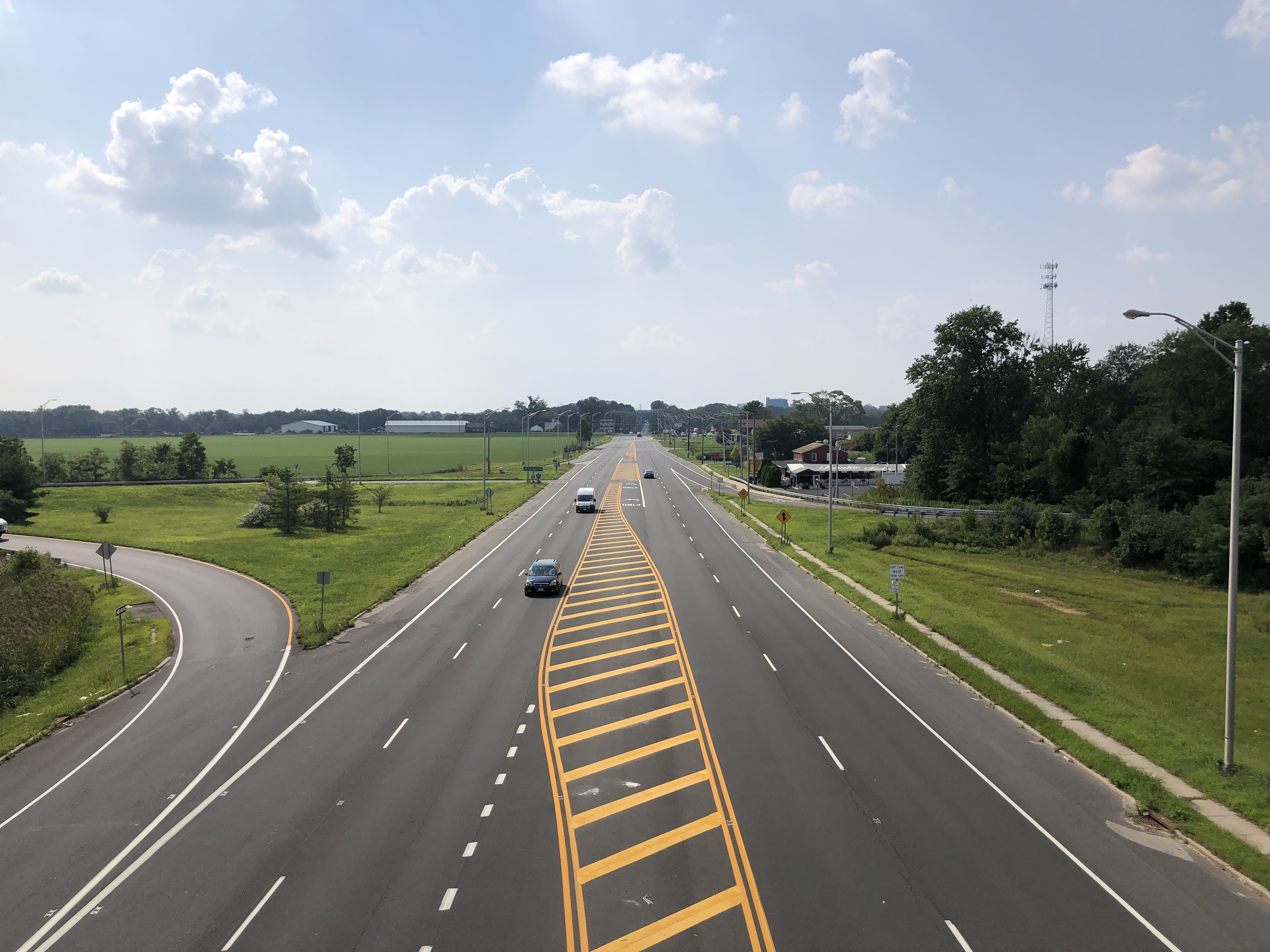
Route 33 Business westbound at CR 55 in Freehold Township

Business Route 33 begins at the interchange with Route 33, its parent route, in Manalapan. A short distance after, the interchange from Route 33 eastbound merges into Business Route 33, and the route passes to the south of Monmouth Battlefield State Park and enters Freehold Township. Business Route 33 intersects with US 9, becoming Park Avenue. Business Route 33 turns to the southeast and enters Freehold, passing to the north of the Freehold Raceway and intersects with West Main Street (CR 537). A short distance later, Business Route 33 intersects at a traffic light with South Street (Route 79) in Downtown Freehold. After the intersection of South Street (Route 79), it crosses back into Freehold Township. Farther east, the route passes over the Freehold Industrial Track railroad line operated by the Delaware & Raritan River Railroad and interchanges with Halls Mill Road/Kozloski Road (CR 55). After the interchange with Halls Mill Road/Kozloski Road (CR 55), Business Route 33 enters Howell. At the intersection of Fairfield Road/Brickyard Road, Business Route 33 enters the interchange with Route 33 and the freeway, where the designation terminates.

Business Route 33 originates as an alignment of Route 33, designated across the state in the 1927 New Jersey state highway renumbering as a replacement to Route 1 and Route 7, which were assigned in the 1920s. The route remained intact for several decades, continuing as the proposals for the crosstown Route 33 Freeway during the 1960s were drawn up. The new Route 33 was to be 39 miles (63 km) long, starting at US 1 in Trenton, crossing through Princeton and into Hightstown, where it would connect with the current-day Route 133, heading eastward, where it would connect with the unbuilt Driscoll Expressway in Freehold. The freeway would continue, meeting the Garden State Parkway near exit 100 in Neptune and terminate at Route 18 in Neptune. However, the next year, the New Jersey Department of Transportation had to scale down the project to a new bypass of Freehold, and prevent the congestion of traffic through the borough. Design studies began that year, and the entire bypass was constructed during the 1970s and 1980s, with most of the freeway finished in 1988. This new bypass was designated as Route 33 Bypass from 1965 until Route 33 was re-aligned off the local roads onto the new freeway in 1990, which at that time, Route 33 Bus. was designated on the former alignment.

Major intersections
The entire route is in Monmouth County.

Location	mi	km	Destinations	Notes
Manalapan Township	0.00	0.00	Route 33 west	Access to westbound Route 33 and from eastbound Route 33; western terminus of Business Route 33; interchange
Freehold Township	2.35	3.78	US 9 – The Amboys, Lakewood	
Freehold Borough	2.92	4.70	CR 537 (West Main Street) – Colts Neck, Smithburg	
Freehold Borough	3.47	5.58	Route 79 (South Street) – Matawan, Lakewood	
Freehold Township	4.94	7.95	CR 55 (Halls Mill Road, Kozloski Road)	Interchange
Howell Township	6.89	11.09	Route 33 east	Access to eastbound Route 33 and from westbound Route 33; eastern terminus of Route 33 Bus.; interchange
1.000 mi = 1.609 km; 1.000 km = 0.621 mi: Incomplete access

== Related routes ==
- Route 133
