= Chews Landing, New Jersey =

Populated place in Camden County, New Jersey, US

- Unincorporated community
- Location in Camden County (Inset: Camden County in New Jersey) Chews Landing (New Jersey) Chews Landing (the United States)
- Coordinates: 39°50′00″N 75°03′47″W
- Country: United States
- State: New Jersey
- County: Camden
- Township: Gloucester
- Named for: Jeremiah Chew
- Elevation: 39 ft (12 m)
- Time zone: UTC−05:00 (Eastern (EST))
  - Summer (DST): UTC−04:00 (EDT)
- Area code: 856
- GNIS feature ID: 882408

Chews Landing (or Chews) is an unincorporated community situated within Gloucester Township, in Camden County, in the U.S. state of New Jersey. The community is located near the Big Timber Creek and is named after Jeremiah Chew, a Revolutionary War officer.

Chews Landing is notable for being the site of St. John's Episcopal Church and Burying Ground, a historic church that was constructed in 1880. This church is an important landmark in the area and was recognized for its historical significance when it was added to the National Register of Historic Places in 1980.
