= Smithburg, New Jersey =

Populated place in Monmouth County, New Jersey, US

- Unincorporated community
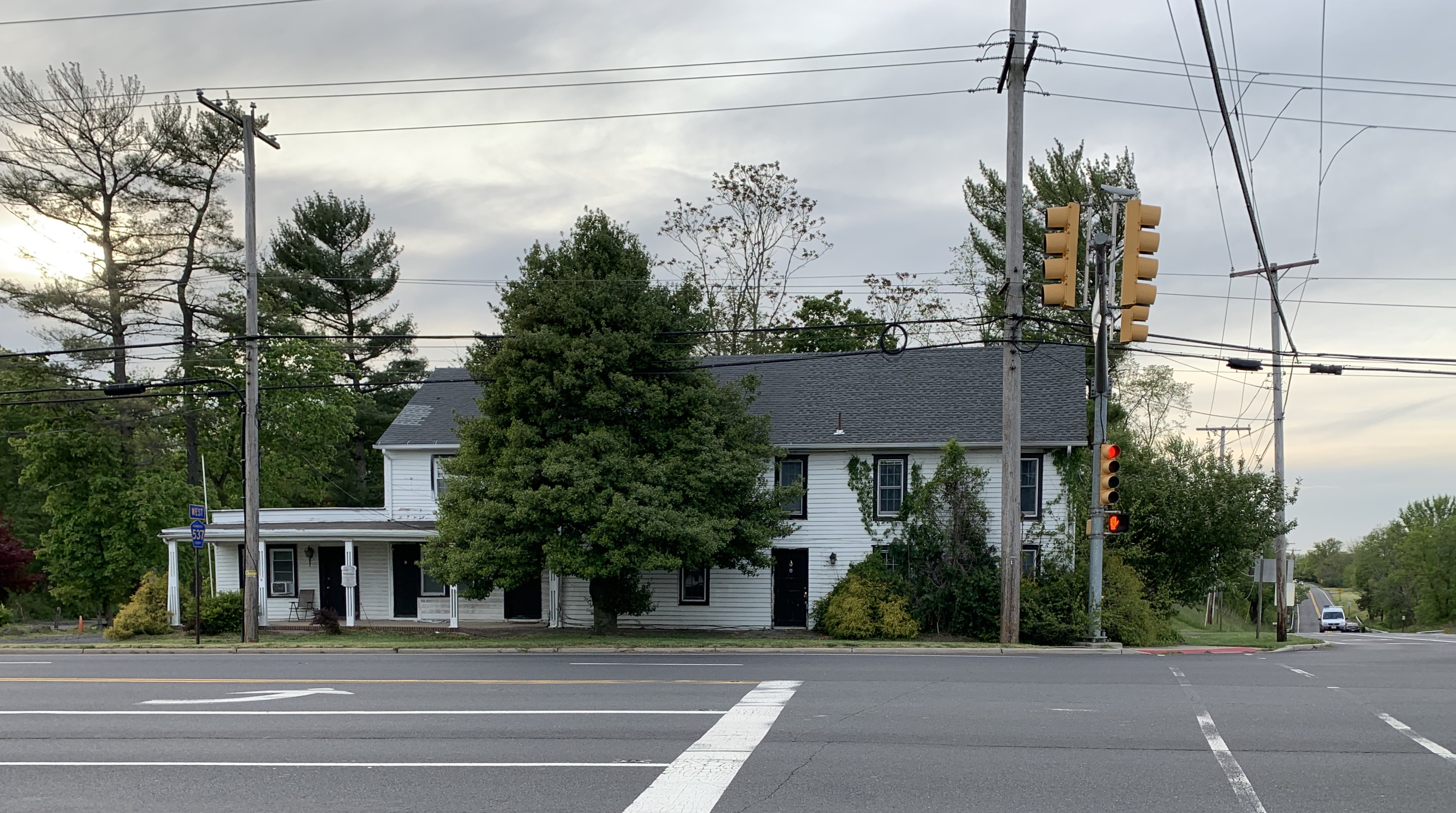
- The Smithburg Tavern, located on the corner of Monmouth Road (CR 537) and Smithburg Road (CR 527)

- Location of Smithburg in Monmouth County Inset: Location of county within the state of New Jersey Smithburg (New Jersey) Smithburg (the United States)
- Coordinates: 40°12′32″N 74°21′11″W
- Country: United States
- State: New Jersey
- County: Monmouth
- Township: Freehold, Manalapan and Millstone
- Elevation: 171 ft (52 m)
- Time zone: UTC−05:00 (Eastern (EST))
  - Summer (DST): UTC−04:00 (EDT)
- Area codes: 732/848
- GNIS feature ID: 880663

Smithburg is an unincorporated community located where the municipal boundaries of Freehold, Manalapan and Millstone townships intersect in Monmouth County, in the U.S. state of New Jersey. County Route 527 and Monmouth Road (County Routes 537/524) pass through the center of the quaint village of Smithburg.

== History ==
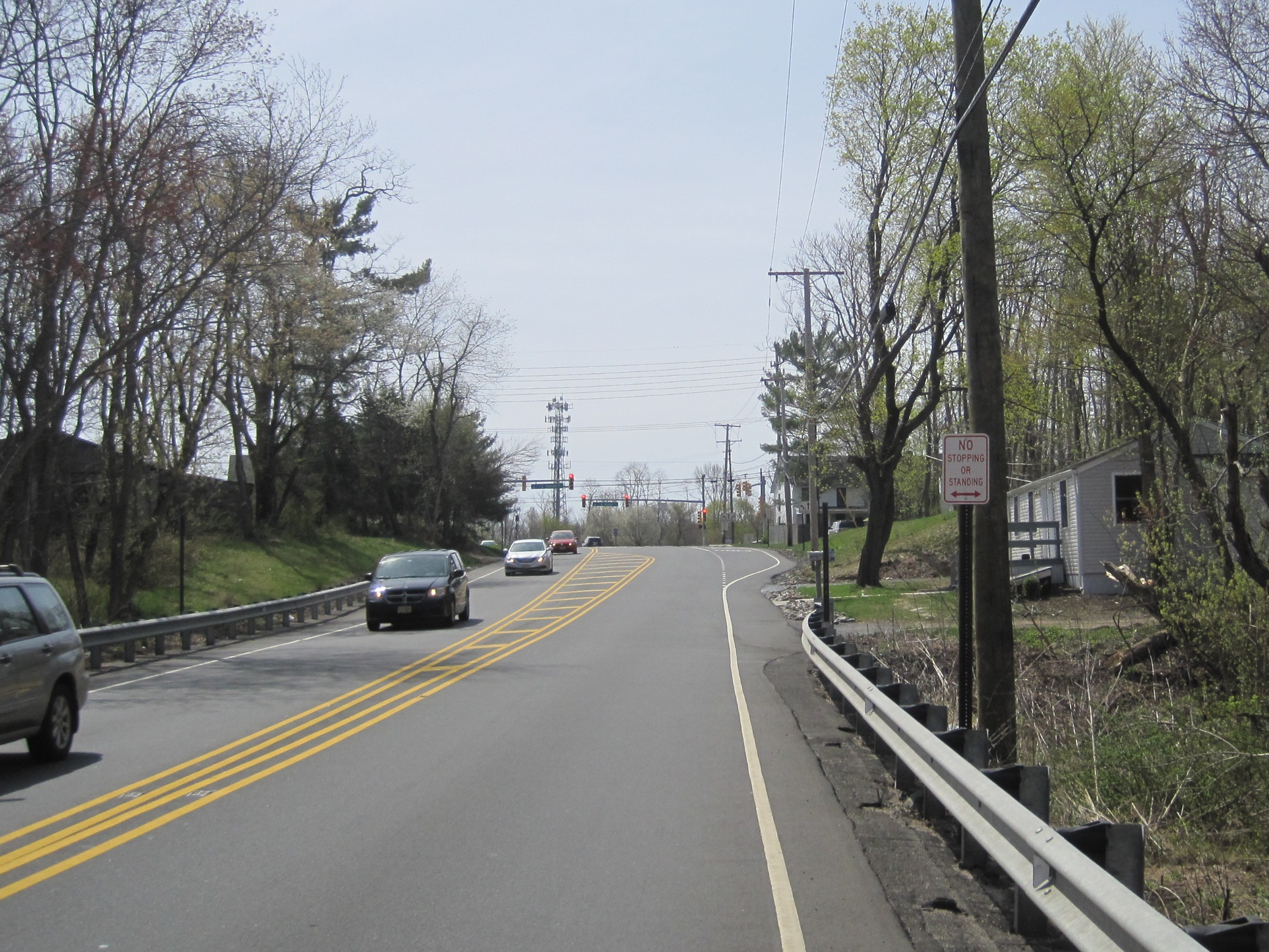
Southbound on CR 527 approaching the CR 537/524 intersection

In 1684, the 2nd Deputy Governor of East Jersey Gawen Lawrie instituted "The Burlington Path", a stagecoach route meant to connect Burlington, the Capital of West Jersey, and Perth Amboy, the Capital of East Jersey. Much of modern-day Monmouth Road (County Route 537) coincides in general direction and trajectory with this historic stagecoach route. By the mid 18th century, one of the stagecoach stops listed on the route was the Smithburg Tavern, suggesting that the community had already been rather established by this point.

The Smithburg Tavern was the birthplace of New Jersey politician Joel Parker, a prominent "War Democrat", who would later in life serve two nonconsecutive terms as the 20th Governor of New Jersey; one term from 1863 to 1866, and another term from 1872 to 1875. Parker died on January 2, 1888, in Philadelphia and was buried in nearby Maplewood Cemetery, within the center of Freehold Township, New Jersey. His burial place also happens to be located right along the historic "Burlington Path" on what is now West Main Street (County Route 537), adjacent to the Freehold Raceway Mall.

The Smithburg General Store, the only store in the area, operated on the corner opposite the Smithburg Tavern on County Route 537 and Smithburg Road.

The only sawmill in the area, located on County Route 537, produced lumber for building in Smithburg and Freehold.

The historically preserved Monmouth Battlefield and the historic villages of Clarksburg and West Freehold are a short distance away.

Some farmers claim Hessians, mercenary German soldiers for the British during the Revolutionary War, either deserted their fighting at the Monmouth Battlefield or lost their way. Their bodies were found on the site of a local farm.

== Geography ==
The Manalapan Brook flows through the center of this community. The brook continues to the South River, which starts along the border of Spotswood and Old Bridge Township. The headwaters for the Manasquan River also originate near the community.

== Notable people ==
People who were born in, residents of, or otherwise closely associated with Smithburg include:

- Joel Parker (1816–1888), Former governor of New Jersey who was important to the Union's cause during the American Civil War.
