= Monmouth County Plank Road =

Plank road in New Jersey

Coordinates: 40.248°N 74.273°W

The Monmouth County Plank Road was a plank road in New Jersey, running north from Freehold to Keyport by way of Matawan. Its path is now roughly followed by New Jersey Route 79.

The Monmouth County Plank Road was chartered February 20, 1850 to run from Freehold to Keyport.

== See also ==
- List of turnpikes in New Jersey
