= New Jersey Route 79 =

State highway in Monmouth County, New Jersey, US

Route 79
- Route 79 highlighted in red

Route information
- Maintained by NJDOT
- Length: 12.1 mi (19.5 km)
- Existed: January 1, 1953–present

Major junctions
- South end: US 9 / Route 33 in Freehold Township
- Route 33 Bus. in Freehold; CR 537 in Freehold; Route 18 in Marlboro
- North end: Route 34 / CR 516 Spur in Matawan

Location
- Country: United States
- State: New Jersey
- Counties: Monmouth

Highway system
- New Jersey State Highway Routes; Interstate; US; State; Scenic Byways
← I-78	→ I-80

Route 79 is a state highway located in Monmouth County in the U.S. state of New Jersey. It runs 12.1 mi (19.5 km) from an intersection of US 9 in Freehold Township north to an intersection of Route 34 and Main Street (CR 516 Spur) in Matawan. The route is a mostly two-lane undivided road that passes through a mixture of suburban residential, urban commercial, and open rural areas. The route interchanges with Route 33 in Freehold Township, intersects with Business Route 33 and CR 537 in Freehold, interchanges with Route 18 and intersects with CR 520 in Marlboro, and intersects with CR 516 in Matawan.

In 1927, the current alignment of Route 79 was designated as a part of Route 4, which was to run from Cape May to the George Washington Bridge, and US 9 was additionally designated along the route by the 1940s. After US 9 and Route 4 were moved to a new routing between Freehold and Cheesequake, the former route became Route 4A, a spur of Route 4. In 1953, Route 4A became Route 79 between Freehold and Matawan and an extension of Route 34 between Matawan and Cheesequake.

== Route description ==
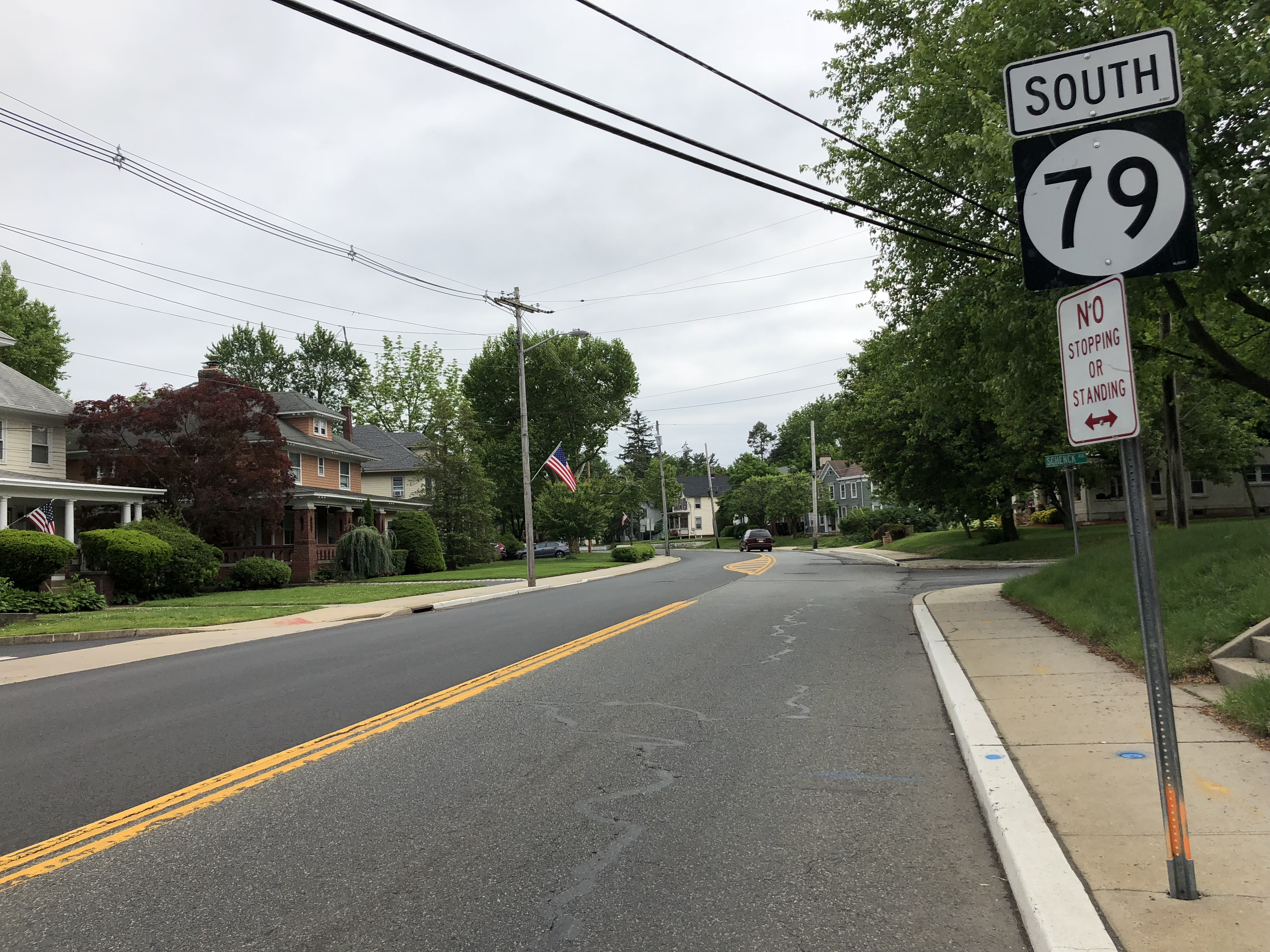
Route 79 southbound at Route 34 in Matawan

Route 79 begins at an intersection of US 9 in Freehold Township, heading north on South Street, a two-lane divided highway that soon becomes an undivided road. It interchanges with Route 33 and continues through a mix of residential and commercial areas. The route enters Freehold, where it crosses the intersection of Park Avenue (Business Route 33). Route 79 heads into Downtown Freehold, where it crosses the Freehold Industrial Track railroad line operated by the Delaware and Raritan River Railroad and intersects with West Main Street (CR 537). Here, the route heads northeast on West Main Street to run concurrently with CR 537 for a short distance. It eventually splits from CR 537 by forking to the left to head northeast on Broadway while CR 537 continues east-northeast on East Main Street. The route continues to travels north on Broadway, as it heads past homes and eventually passes by Freehold High School at the intersection of Route 79 and Dutch Lane Road (CR 46). Route 79 crosses back into Freehold Township, where it continues through suburban residential areas, with intermittent farms and woods. It heads into Marlboro. The route passes some businesses before it widens into a four-lane divided highway and comes to an interchange with Route 18.

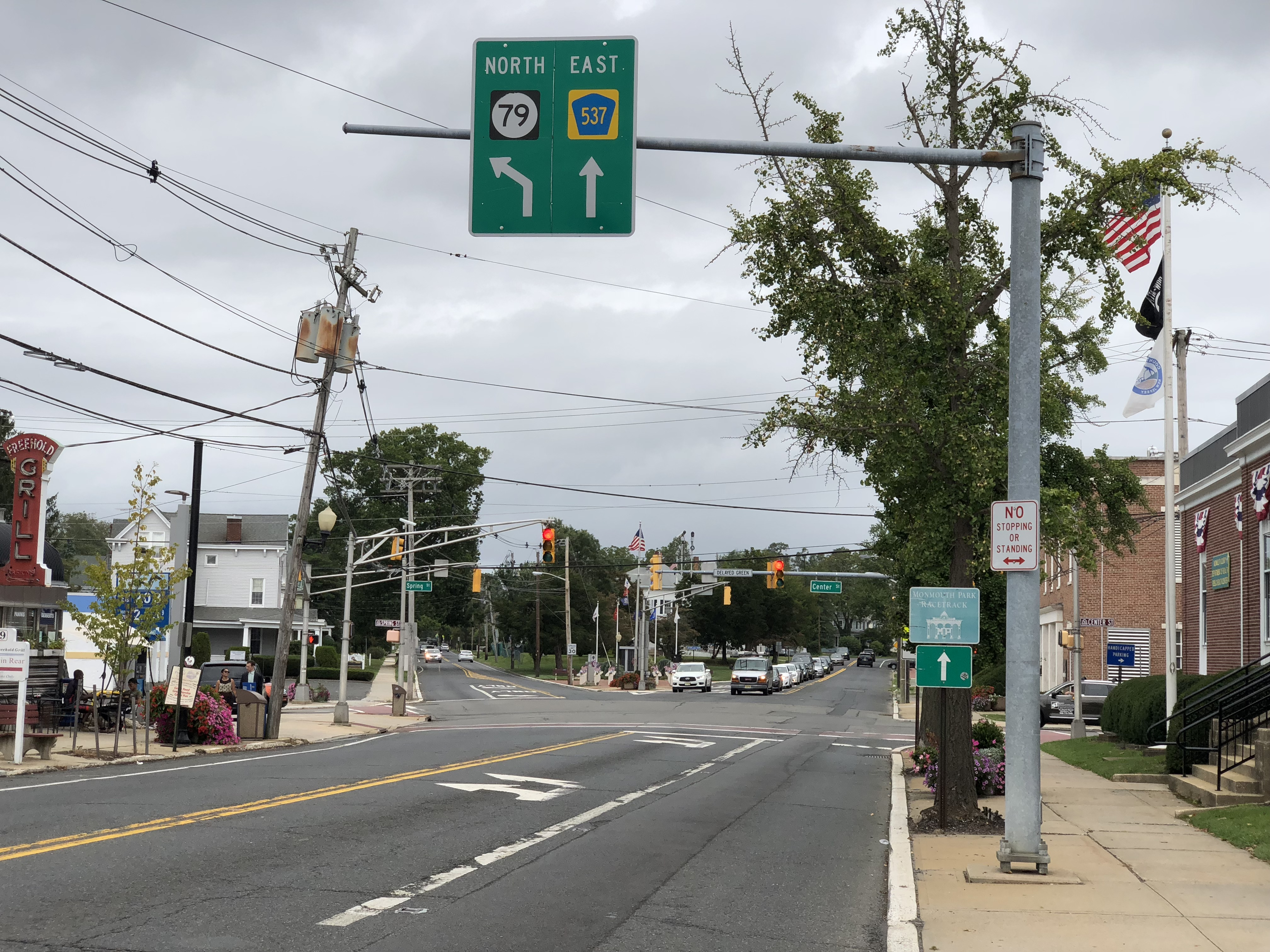
Route 79 northbound at the split with CR 537 eastbound in Freehold

Past this interchange, Route 79 heads through a mix of homes and businesses, narrowing back into a two-lane undivided road. The route continues as Route 79 at the intersection of School Road. The road passes through residential and commercial areas with some farm fields, along with passing by Marlboro High School, and then intersecting with Newman Springs Road (CR 520). Past this intersection, Route 79 continues north and heads into more suburban areas, with the Henry Hudson Trail parallel to the west of the road before it splits to the west. The road heads through wooded areas with some development, intersects with Tennent Road (CR 3) in Morganville and forms a short concurrency with that route that lasts until CR 3 heads northeast on Lloyd Road. Route 79 continues north through wooded neighborhoods and enters Matawan, where it becomes Main Street. It passes through residential areas and heads across the Henry Hudson Trail before the road crosses the intersection of Broad Street/New Brunswick Avenue (CR 516) in a commercial area. Route 79 continues a short distance north past this intersection to its northern terminus at the intersection of Route 34. At this intersection, unsigned CR 516 Spur continues northeast on Main Street.

== History ==
Route 4A
- Location: Freehold–Cheesequake
- Existed: 1940s–1953

What has become Route 79 is an original road for the area. On June 7, 1701, a patent was granted to John Johnstone for a road from old Oysterbank Landing (Matawan Creek) to Wickatunk. This would have roughly followed that Route 79 path. Almost the entirety of the road was maintained in the late 19th century as part of the Monmouth County Plank Road. Before 1927, what is today Route 79 was an unnumbered road. In the 1927 New Jersey state highway renumbering, the route was legislated as part of Route 4, which was to run from Cape May to the George Washington Bridge. Between 1932 and 1934, the State Highway Department took over this section of the route, and US 9 was realigned to follow this portion of road along with Route 4. Beginning with a bypass of Freehold in 1938, US 9 and Route 4 were moved to a new alignment between Freehold and Cheesequake, and the former alignment between these two points became Route 4A, a spur of Route 4. The realignment was completed by 1941. In the 1953 New Jersey state highway renumbering, Route 4A became Route 79 between Freehold and Matawan and an extension of Route 34 between Matawan and Cheesequake. On December 15, 2006, a project which rebuilt the intersection between US 9 and Route 79 was completed. This project's goals included improved safety and reduced traffic congestion.

== Major intersections ==
The entire route is in Monmouth County.

Location	mi	km	Destinations	Notes
Freehold Township	0.0	0.0	US 9 – Lakewood, The Amboys	Southern terminus
Freehold Township	0.1	0.16	Route 33 – Trenton, Asbury Pk	Interchange
Freehold Borough	0.7	1.1	Route 33 Bus. (Park Ave) – Trenton, Asbury Park, Inspection Sta	
Freehold Borough	1.4	2.3	CR 537 west (W Main St)	South end of the overlap with CR 537
Freehold Borough	1.5	2.4	CR 537 east (E Main St)	North end of the overlap with CR 537
Marlboro Township	5.1	8.2	Route 18 – New Brunswick, Pt Pleasant	Exits 25A-B (Route 18)
Marlboro Township	6.8	10.9	CR 520 (Newman Springs Rd) to G.S. Parkway south – Robertsville, Marlboro State Hospital, Holmdel	
Matawan	11.8	19.0	CR 516 (New Brunswick Ave/Broad St) – Old Bridge, Keyport	
Matawan	12.1	19.5	Route 34 – The Amboys, Asbury Park CR 516 Spur east (Main St) – Keyport	Northern terminus; western terminus of CR 516 Spur
1.000 mi = 1.609 km; 1.000 km = 0.621 mi: Concurrency terminus; Incomplete access
