= CentraState Medical Center =

- Atlantic Health System / Rutgers University (Robert Wood Johnson Medical School)
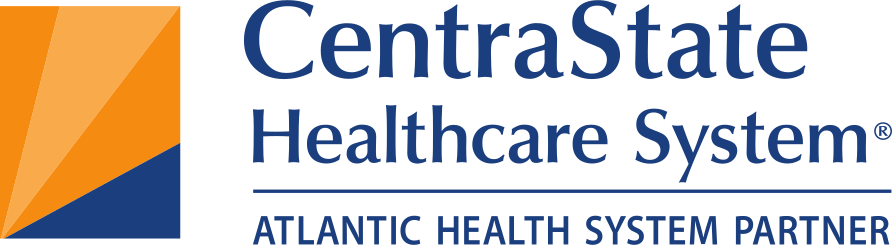

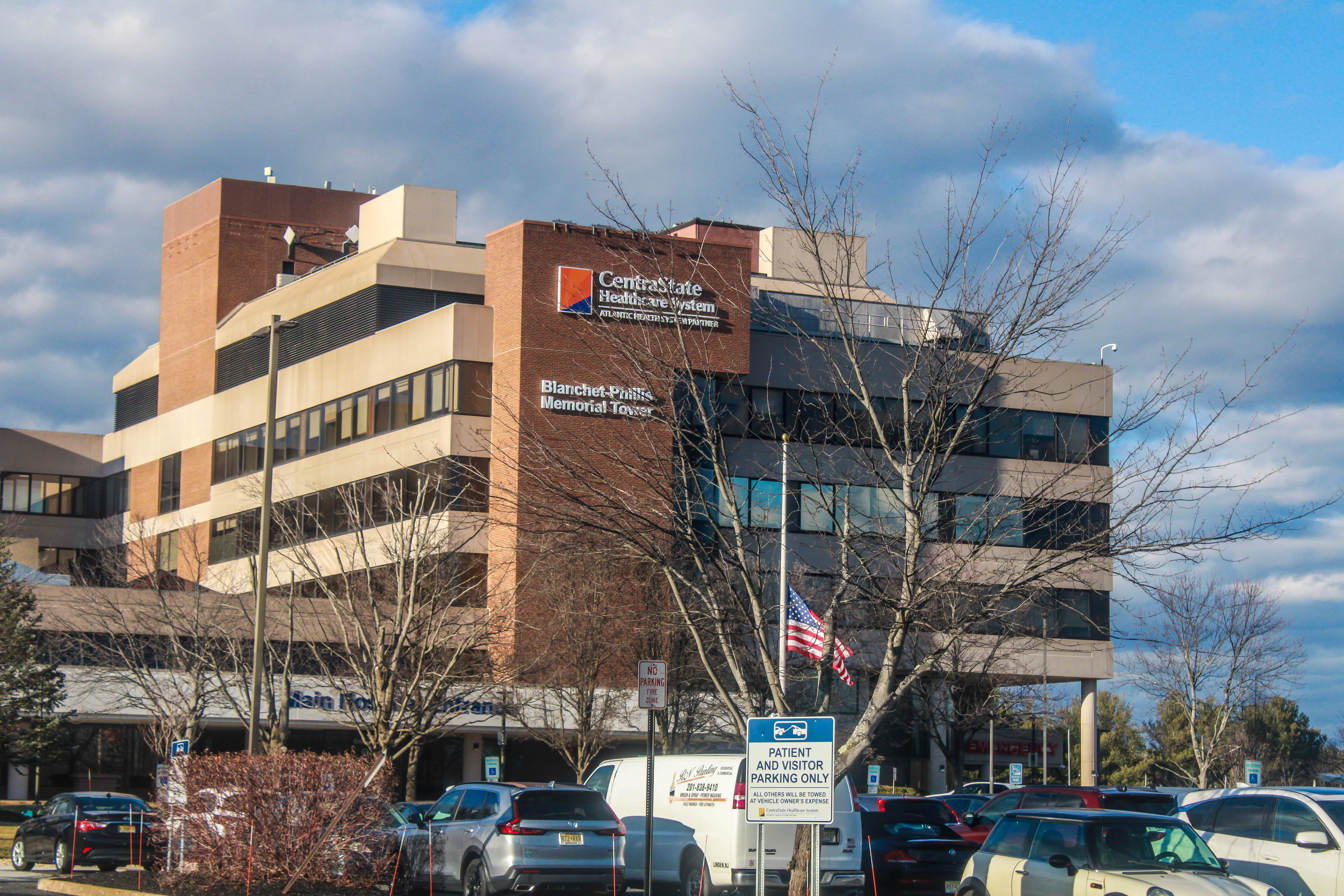
- CentraState Medical Center's Blanchet Phillis Memorial Tower (2024)

Geography
- Location: 901 West Main Street; Freehold Township, New Jersey, United States
- Coordinates: 40.238°N 74.312°W

Organization
- Affiliated university: Rutgers Robert Wood Johnson Medical School

Services
- Emergency department: Yes
- Beds: 284

Helipads
- Helipad: Yes

History
- Founded: 1971

Links
- Website: www.centrastate.com
- Lists: Hospitals in the United States

CentraState Healthcare System is a non-for-profit community health organization located in Freehold, New Jersey. CentraState Healthcare serves patients in western Monmouth County, northern Ocean County, southern Middlesex County, and parts of Mercer County in the heart of Central New Jersey. The healthcare network consists of an acute-care hospital with an ambulatory care campus, three senior living communities, several Family Practice locations, a Family Medicine Residency Program, Immediate Care locations, and a charitable foundation. Established in 1971, CentraState's Main Medical Center consists of an ambulatory campus, a wellness & fitness center, and a family medicine center. The Main Medical Center building has 284 beds.

On October 22, 2020, officials from Atlantic Health System announced that they were acquiring a 51% stake in Freehold based CentraState Healthcare System. As a part of the deal, CentraState will continue to govern themselves while Atlantic Health System has committed to invest $135 million into the hospital.

== Notable departments and offerings ==
- Family Practice of CentraState provides primary medical services to local patients, spread throughout multiple healthcare pavilions in the Central Jersey region. Family Practice locations include Freehold Township (Main Medical Center), Colts Neck, East Windsor, Jackson, Marlboro, and Monroe.
- Family Medicine Residency Program is located in neighboring Freehold Borough, and is a part of Rutgers Robert Wood Johnson Medical School's Residency Program.
- Star and Barry Tobias Ambulatory Campus is connected to CentraState's Main Medical Center. Opened in 2007, the campus features a wide array of healthcare services, aimed to assist patients with maintaining and regaining health. Services and programs offered at the campus include cardiac diagnostics, cardiac rehabilitation, chronic disease management, dialysis, diabetes, preventive screenings, physical therapy, a sleep center, and many other services. The campus is also the location of CentraState's Fitness and Wellness Center.
- Women's Health Specialists provide comprehensive gynecological and obstetrical care to female patients. Services are available at the Main Medical Center, and additionally at locations in Marlboro and East Windsor.

== Awards ==
In 2024, Castle Connolly Medical's “Top Hospital Overall” list (published in Jersey’s Best magazine) ranked CentraState Medical Center in Freehold Township as the 7th best overall hospital for the state of New Jersey. CentraState's ranking within the top-ten, joins other Atlantic Health System partners within the top-ten, including Morristown Medical Center in Morristown and Chilton Memorial Hospital in Pompton Plains (1st), Overlook Medical Center in Summit (2nd), Newtown Medical Center in Newtown (3rd), Goryeb Children’s Hospital in Morristown (4th), and Hackettstown Medical Center in Hackettstown (5th).

== Satellite locations ==
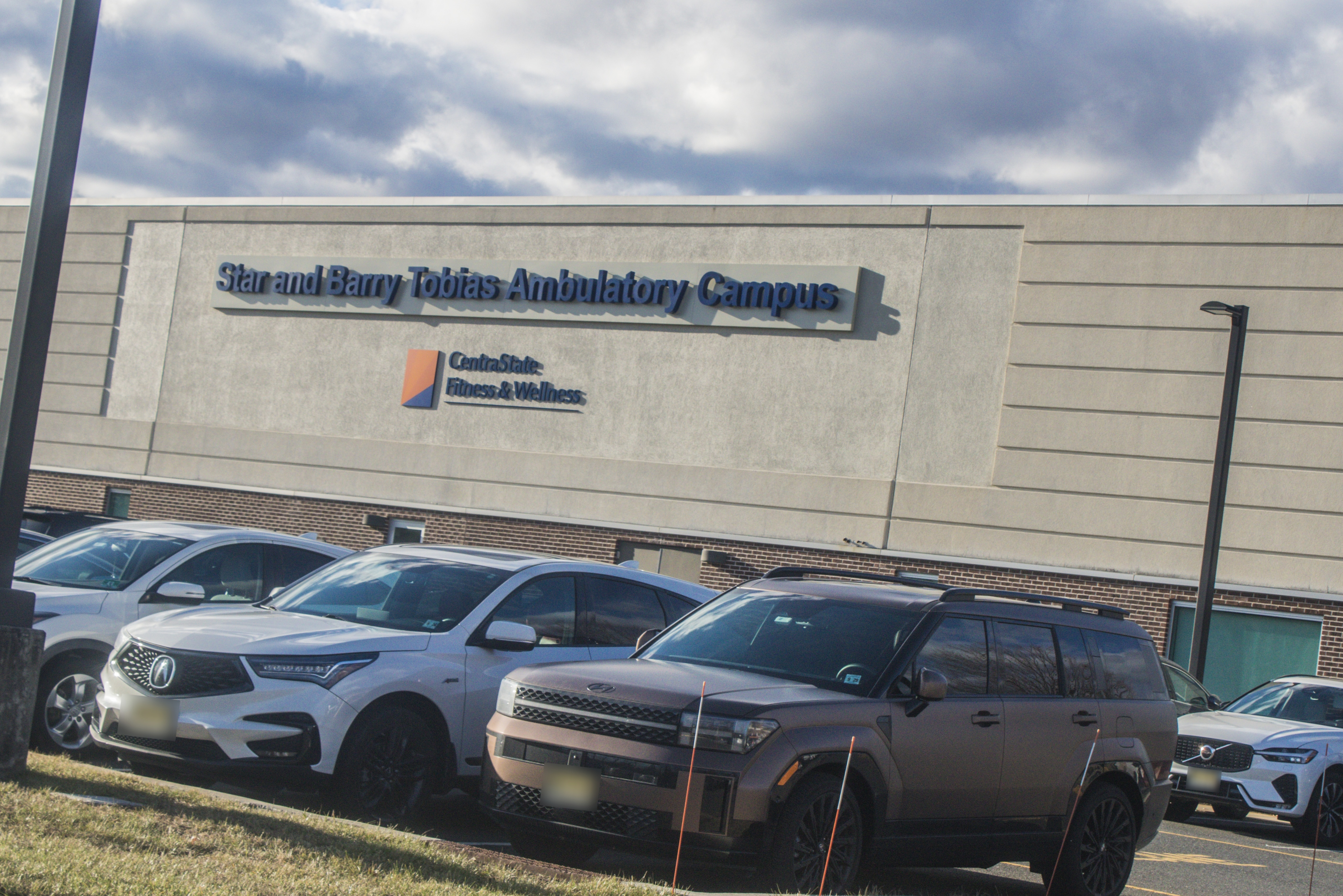
Star and Barry Tobias Ambulatory Campus

- CentraState Medical Center, the main medical campus that was opened in 1971, 901 West Main Street, Freehold Township, NJ
- CentraState Health Pavilion at Marlboro, 479 Newman Springs Road, Marlboro, NJ
- CentraState Medical Office at Monroe, 312 Applegarth Road, Monroe, NJ
- CentraState Health Pavilion at East Windsor, 319 U.S. Route 130 North, East Windsor, NJ
- CentraState Health Pavilion at Jackson, 161 Bartley Road, Jackson, NJ
- Star and Barry Tobias Ambulatory Campus, opened in 2007, it is located adjacent to CentraState's Main Medical Center in Freehold Township. It is the home of CentraState's Fitness and Wellness Center.

== Affiliations ==
CentraState Healthcare System has been a partner of Atlantic Health System since 2022. CentraState is also affiliated with Rutgers University Robert Wood Johnson Medical School.
