= Monmouth County Jewish Heritage Museum =

The Jewish Heritage Museum of Monmouth County
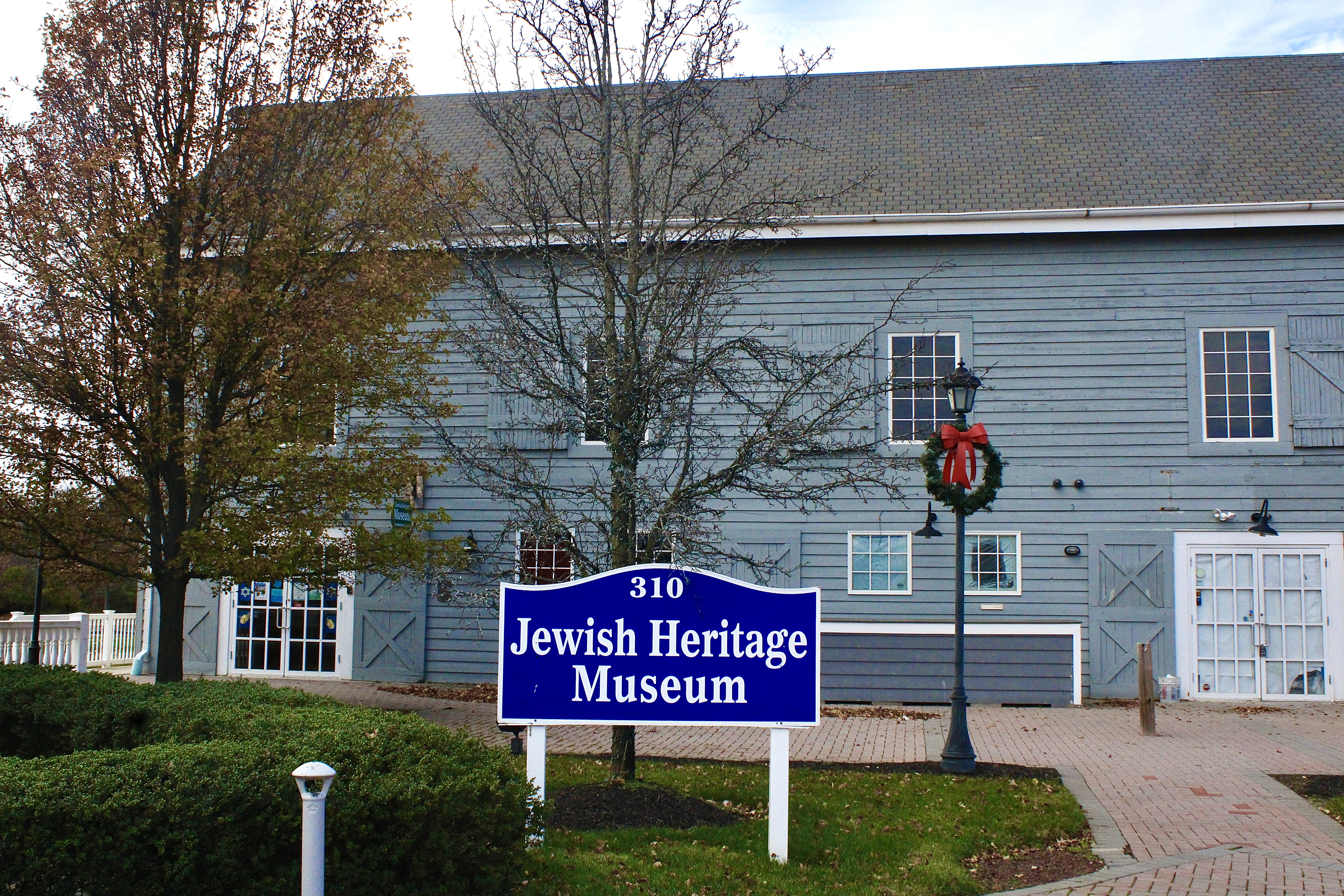
- Established: Incorporated 2006; opened 2008
- Location: Freehold, New Jersey, US
- Coordinates: 40°14′34″N 74°18′23″W
- Type: Art museum
- Collections: 18th and 19th-century artifacts to the property
- Director: Jessica Solomon
- Public transit access: NJ Transit Bus (local service on the 833, 836 and 307 routes)
- Website: www.jhmomc.org

The Jewish Heritage Museum of Monmouth County was established in 2006 by a group of county residents headed by professionals from the Jewish Federation of Monmouth County. The museum opened to the public in 2008, "dedicated to the promotion of public awareness of the County’s Jewish heritage for the education and enjoyment of both children and adults." The museum is located at Mount's Corner Historic Shopping Center in the historic village of West Freehold. The museum features numerous collections of furniture, artifacts, rare documents, and books that had been preserved at the Levi Solomon Farmstead, one of New Jersey's earliest known Jewish farmsteads.

== History ==
The township in its early days was a place of refuge for persecuted religious groups, such as Presbyterians, Baptists, and Quakers. The Solomon family were some of New Jersey's earliest Jewish settlers. They settled on a large piece of farmland, roughly where much of the modern-day shopping center 'Mount's Corner' is located, as early as 1720. However, during the Philadelphia Campaign in the American Revolutionary War, the British had attempted to burn down their estate on their way to escape to New York City. This event precluded the Battle of Monmouth, in which the Continental Army was able to intercept the British's attempt on their route to New York. The battle took place in modern-day Freehold and Manalapan.

Their dwelling had suffered significant damage from the fire. Matriarch Hannah Solomon, who was widowed, was able to save her house, along with the help of her two sons. The family had built a new barn and farmhouse on the farm in the 1800s. The barn's proportions remain intact to what it would've looked like in the 19th century. The barn is now the location of the Monmouth County Jewish Heritage Museum at Mount's Corner.

In 1820, the Solomon farmstead and the Oakley Farmstead occupied a vast amount of farmland. However, during the 20th century, suburbanization and commercial development had greatly changed the shape of the once agricultural township. Due to this, in the 1990s, the farmhouse and barn were moved to the rear of the property.

In 2005, with the collaboration of Monmouth County residents and the Jewish Federation of Monmouth County, the upper level of the Solomon Farmstead became the Jewish Heritage Museum of Monmouth County. It was officially incorporated on February 16, 2006. The museum opened to the public in 2008.

== Education ==
The Jewish Heritage Museum of Monmouth County has featured several art galleries and exhibits on Jewish history. During the 225th anniversary of the Battle of Monmouth, former barn owner Bernard Hochberg attended the lecture given by Jean Klerman about Monmouth County Jewish History, citing the book "Peddler to Suburbanite: The History of the Jews of Monmouth County, NJ,”. After the lecture, Hochberg presented conceptions of the potential Jewish historical museum at the Solomon Farsmstead. The public presentation of Jewish history to Monmouth County and the importance of preserving the Solomon farmstead helped get the museum approved by the Freehold Township planning board for operation.

The museum continues to be a great educational resource of Jewish history, both locally and globally. Before the museum closed temporality due to the COVID-19 pandemic, the museum in 2019 featured an exhibit on "Jews of India: The History and Practices of the Bene Israel Cochin, and Baghadi Jews". As of 2022, the museum currently has an exhibit on "Rabbi Sally J. Priesand: A Fifty Year Celebration, dedicated to honoring Sally J. Priesand as being the first female rabbi ordained by a rabbinical seminary in the United States, and the second formally ordained female rabbi in the history of Judaism.

== Publications ==
- "Peddler to Suburbanite: The History of the Jews of Monmouth County, NJ,”, Dr. Alan S. Pine, Jean C. Hershenov and Dr. Aaron H. Lefkowitz . (1981)

== See also ==
- Jewish Federation
- Monmouth County Historical Association
- Freehold Public Library
- Monmouth Battlefield State Park
