= CSMC =

CSMC may refer to:

- Confederate States Marine Corps, a branch of the Confederate States Navy during the American Civil War
- Command Sergeants Major Course, a career development course of the United States Army
- Cedars-Sinai Medical Center, a hospital in Los Angeles, California
- CentraState Medical Center, a hospital in Freehold, New Jersey
- Chaim Sheba Medical Center, the largest hospital in Israel.
- Central Saint Martins College of Art and Design, famous Art School in London
- Cave Story Modding Community, a dedicated community of individuals focused on modding Cave Story (2004).
