= Overlook Medical Center =

Coordinates: 40.7123°N 74.3542°W

Atlantic Health Overlook Medical Center
- Atlantic Health

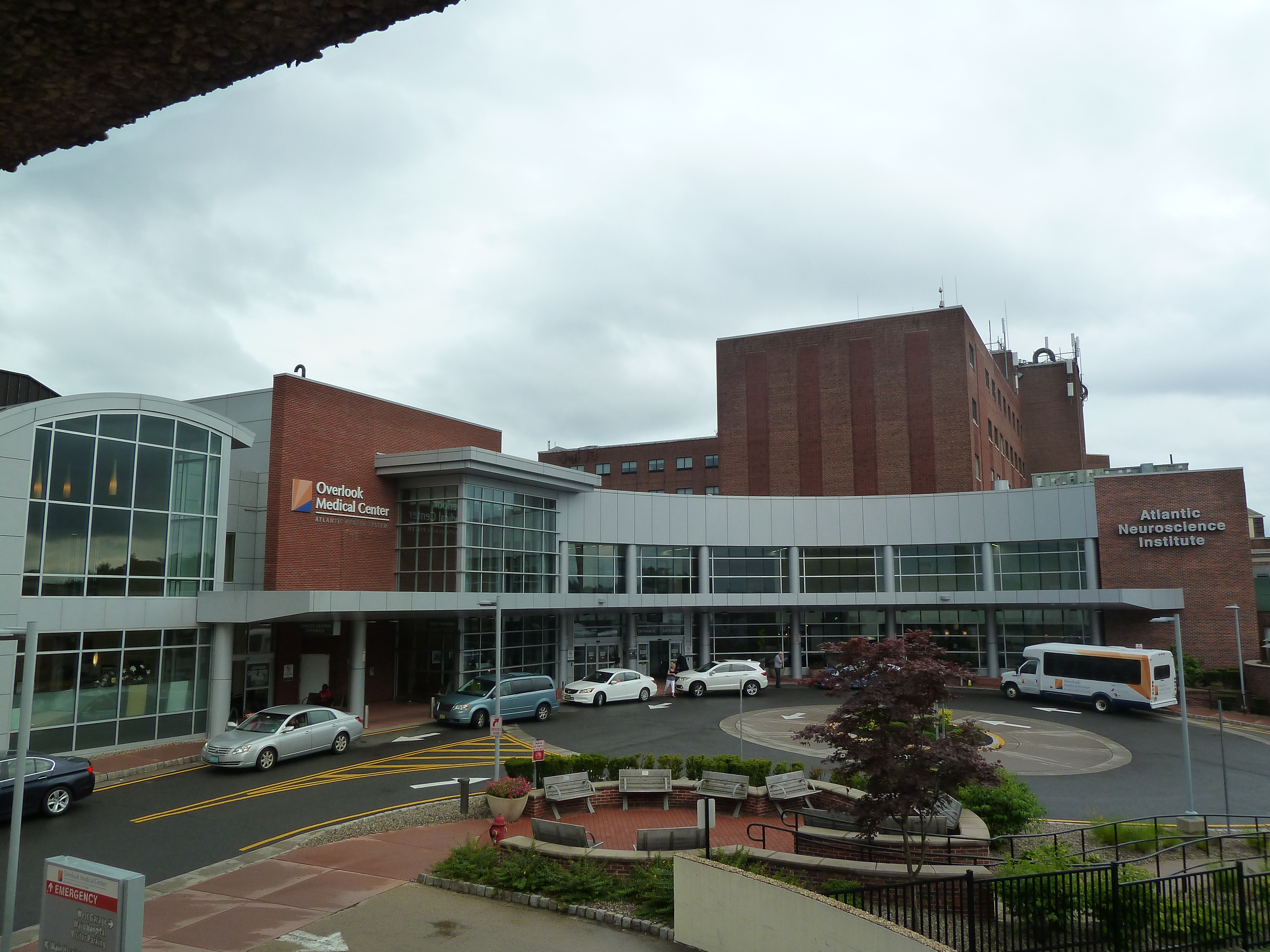
- Overlook Medical Center

Geography
- Location: 99 Beauvoir Avenue, Summit, New Jersey, United States

Organization
- Type: Teaching
- Affiliated university: Rutgers University

Services
- Standards: JCAHO
- Beds: 504

History
- Founded: 1906

Links
- Website: http://www.atlantichealth.org Atlantic Health
- Lists: Hospitals in New Jersey

Atlantic Health Overlook Medical Center is a non-profit teaching hospital located in Summit, New Jersey, United States, 20 miles west of New York City. On a hill in the center of the city, the hospital is one of Summit's three largest employers and offers medical services to Summit and surrounding communities in Northern New Jersey.

== History ==
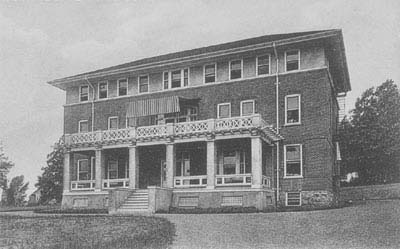
Overlook Hospital in 1906.

Overlook Hospital was founded in 1906 by Dr. William Henry Lawrence, Jr. who purchased land on the "highest point in Summit" overlooking the Baltusrol Valley. There he built a three-story structure which housed an operating room, x-ray facility, and hydraulically powered elevator. This facility, which was privately owned, began with 42 beds and cost approximately $30,000 in total. The hospital established a nursing school in 1912. Further construction increased patient capacity to 148 beds by 1940.

In the 1960s, doctors experimented with new techniques. In one instance, doctors authorized use of alcoholic beverages to delay the onset of contractions of a pregnant woman.

The Valerie Fund Children's Center treats juvenile cancer and rare blood disorders. Established in 1977, it was the first of its kind in New Jersey.

in 1996 Overlook and Morristown Memorial Hospital merged and became Atlantic Health System. The Gerald J. Glasser Brain Tumor Center was established in 1999.

Overlook completed a $197 million expansion program in 2025. In August 2026 management launched a three-year plan to upgrade the surgical facilities, including robotics capabilities; estimated expenditures are $97 million.

=== Overview ===
Overlook Medical Center is part of Atlantic Health which also runs the Morristown Medical Center.

=== Specialized departments and centers ===
Overlook has the following departments: Cancer center, Cardiology, Dental surgery, Dermatology, Gastroenterology, Intensive care unit, Internal medicine, Neurology, OB/GYN, Orthopedic services, Pathology, Pediatrics, Physical therapy, Plastic surgery, Psychiatric ward, Radiology, Rehabilitation services, Surgery, Trauma center, and Urology. Notable departments and centers are:

- osteopathic family practice.
- the Goryeb Children's Center, which also helps adolescents, is at Overlook.
- Valerie Fund Children's Cancer Center. It is a pediatric oncology cancer program.
- neonatal intensive care unit and well-baby nursery rotations.
- Neuroscience Institute offers brain tumor and epilepsy programs as well as neurointerventional radiology.
- Brain Tumor Center of New Jersey.
- Walsh Maternity Center-provides maternity and critical care services to high-risk newborns. It offers Calm Birth, an alternative approach to labor that focuses on neuromuscular release and meditation.
- Chest Pain Center.
- same-day surgery Center.
- Hernia Center.
- Wound Care Center.
- Medicare-certified home care and hospice program.
- specialized center for bariatrics.
- Epilepsy Center.
- center for health and eating disorders
- center for sleep medicine.
- heartburn center.
- neuro-interventional radiology program.

=== Affiliations and partnerships ===
Overlook has a clinical affiliation with the Sidney Kimmel Medical College of Thomas Jefferson University.

=== Accreditations ===
Overlook is accredited by the Joint Commission for Accreditation of Health Care Organizations or JCAHO. It is a member of the American Hospital Association and the Hospital Quality Alliance.

=== Rankings ===
Overlook Medical Center ranked as one of the best hospitals in New Jersey in a list compiled by Newsweek and Statista in 2025. For overall clinical performance it was in the top 1% of hospitals nationwide in Healthgrades' 2026 list of America’s Best Hospitals.

=== Finances ===
Overlook Medical Center is a non-profit organization. Donations help Overlook "expand from being a local institution to a regional medical center." There is an Overlook Hospital Foundation Board with trustees who serve three-year terms.

Atlantic Health owns an insurance company in the Cayman Islands entitled AHS Insurance Limited whose purpose is to pay claims against its hospitals.

== Patient billing controversies ==
Overlook was mentioned in a 1991 New York Times article focused on a "financial crisis" in New Jersey healthcare. The Times attributed it to the state legislature's failure to fund a trust which provided financial assistance for low-income patients. Overlook Medical Center, situated in a well-to-do community, added 6% to patients' bills to cover the shortfall. St. Joseph's Hospital and Medical Care Center in Paterson NJ, with more low-income patients, increased patients' bills by 33%. This raised the issue of whether charity patients should be treated equally statewide.

In June 2012 the U.S. Department of Justice announced that AHS Hospital Corp., Atlantic Health System Inc. and Overlook Hospital agreed to pay the United States $9 million to settle allegations that they violated the False Claims Act by allegedly overbilling Medicare. The settlement partially resolved allegations that Overlook overbilled Medicare for patients who were treated on an inpatient basis when they should have been treated as either observation or outpatients, and a False Claims Act suit filed by former employees of Overlook Hospital in U.S. ex rel. Doe et al. v. AHS Hospital Corp., et al., Civ. No. 08-2042 (D.N.J.).

== Rail trail at Overlook ==
The hospital is adjacent to The Summit Park Line, a 1.2-mile pedestrian linear park converted from an abandoned track of the Rahway Valley Railroad. When completed, it is expected to be 7 miles long from the medical center south to Springfield, Union, Kenilworth and Roselle Park at the Cranford border.

== See also ==
- List of hospitals in New Jersey
