= Atlantic Health System =

Healthcare system in New Jersey

Atlantic Health
- Formation: May 1, 1996; 30 years ago
- Purpose: 501(c)(3) health system
- Headquarters: Morristown, New Jersey, U.S.
- Coordinates: 40.77002°N 74.48252°W
- Region served: New Jersey
- Services: Healthcare
- Key people: Saad Ehtisham, DHA, FACHE (President & CEO); Scott Leighty (EVP)
- Revenue: ▲US$3.50 billion (2021)
- Expenses: ▲US$3.21 billion (2021)
- Staff: 18,000 Employees; 4,800 Affiliated Physicians
- Website: www.atlantichealth.org

Atlantic Health is one of the largest non-profit health care networks in New Jersey. It employs 18,000 people and has more than 4,800 affiliated physicians. The system offers over 400 sites of care, including six hospitals: Atlantic Health Chilton Medical Center, Goryeb Children's Hospital, Atlantic Health Hackettstown Medical Center, Atlantic Health Morristown Medical Center, Atlantic Health Newton Medical Center and Atlantic Health Overlook Medical Center.

Atlantic Health serves more than half of the state of New Jersey, including 11 counties and 4.9 million people. Its medical centers have a combined total of 1,860 licensed beds and 4,796 affiliated physicians that provide a wide array of health care services.

The company has been ranked on the FORTUNE 100 Great Place to Work list for 17 years. Atlantic Health also includes the best hospital in New Jersey, Morristown Medical Center, according to both U.S. News & World Report and Newsweek.

The president and chief executive of Atlantic Health is Saad Ehtisham.

== History ==
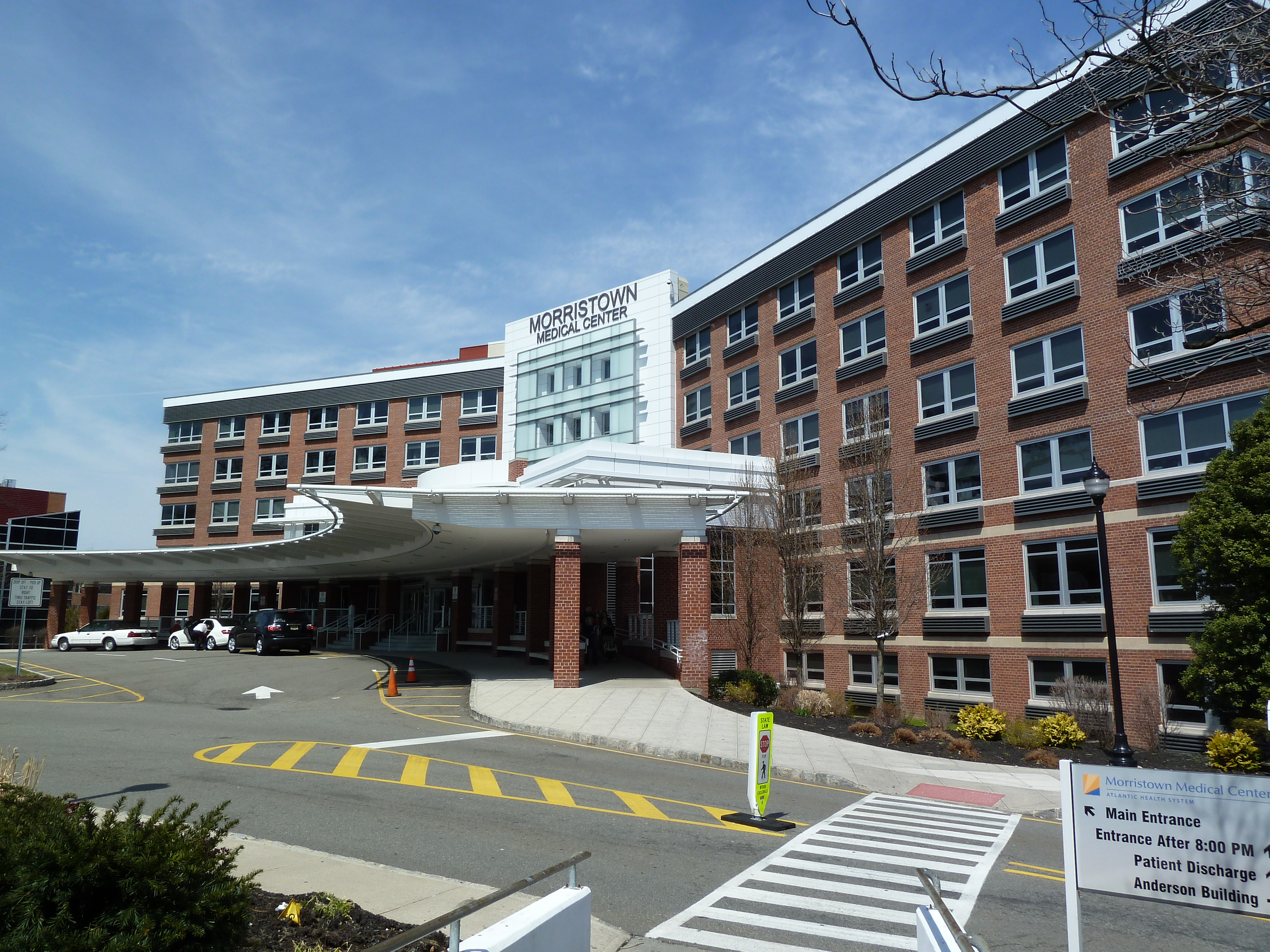
Morristown Medical Center

Atlantic Health was founded in 1996 through the merger of Morristown Memorial Hospital, Overlook Hospital, Mountainside Hospital, and soon after, the General Hospital Center at Passaic. Over the next quarter-century, Atlantic Health System grew to include Morristown Medical Center, Overlook Medical Center and Goryeb Children's Hospital. It added Newton Medical Center in 2011, Chilton Medical Center in 2014 and Hackettstown Medical Center in 2016, along with the new Atlantic Rehabilitation Institute (2019), a new partnership with CentraState Health System (2021), and a longstanding alliance with Hunterdon Healthcare (2014).

On October 22, 2020, officials from Atlantic Health announced that they were acquiring a 51% stake in Freehold based CentraState Healthcare System. As a part of the deal, CentraState will continue to govern themselves while Atlantic Health System has committed to invest $135 million into the hospital.

Atlantic Health and Saint Peter's University Hospital in New Brunswick signed a letter of intent in January 2024 to establish a strategic partnership. On October 6, 2025, Atlantic Health and Saint Peter's Healthcare System announced they agreed not to pursue the partnership.

== Facilities ==
"Atlantic Medical Group" is a physician-led and physician-governed organization comprising more than 1,000 doctors, nurse practitioners, and physician assistants across over 300 locations throughout northern and central New Jersey and northeastern Pennsylvania.

Chilton Medical Center is a community hospital that offers services including surgery, cancer and wound healing.

Goryeb Children's Hospital is a national and state-designated children's hospital with more than 20 pediatric subspecialties located on the same campus as Morristown Medical Center. Goryeb Children's Hospital has more than 250 community pediatricians on staff and more than 100 board-certified pediatric specialists. The hospital provides treatment of pediatric cancer and houses a pediatric intensive care unit (PICU) with 15 inpatient beds. It was named the top Pediatric Emergency Care provider and Best Children's Hospital by the Women's Choice Awards.

Hackettstown Medical Center is a community hospital that has been providing health care to Warren, Sussex and Morris Counties in New Jersey since 1973. The medical center maintains several designations, including Primary Stroke Center from both the New Jersey Department of Health and Senior Services and The Joint Commission's advanced certification program; accreditations from the American College of Radiology for mammography, nuclear medicine, and ultrasound; sleep disorder center accreditation from the American Academy of Sleep Medicine; and Quality of Care recognition for its cardiopulmonary department from the American Association for Respiratory Care. Hackettstown Medical Center is designated a Primary Stroke Center by The Joint Commission.

Morristown Medical Center is a regional Level I Trauma Center, verified by the American College of Surgeons, and it is designated a Level II Trauma Center by the state of New Jersey. It was rated among the best hospitals in New Jersey by U.S. News & World Report and Newsweek and is a nationally recognized leader in cardiology, orthopedics, nursing, critical care and geriatrics. Morristown Medical Center is a Magnet Hospital for Excellence in Nursing Service, the highest level of recognition achievable from the American Nurses Credentialing Center for facilities that provide acute care services.

Newton Medical Center has served its community since 1932 and offers a variety of inpatient and outpatient programs and services. It was recognized in the top 10% in the nation for the treatment of stroke, and has five-star ratings for the treatment of heart failure, respiratory failure and sepsis, according to Healthgrades. It was recognized as one of the safest hospitals in the nation by The Leapfrog Group. Newton Medical Center recently achieved the American Nurses Credentialing Center's Pathway to Excellence designation. It is one of the few health care facilities in New Jersey accredited by the Intersocietal Accreditation Commission (IAC) in all three echocardiography procedures: adult transthoracic, adult transesophageal and adult stress.

Overlook Medical Center was named one of America's 50 Best Hospitals by Healthgrades and recognized as a Best Regional Hospital in the New York Metro area by U.S. News & World Report. It is the regional leader in comprehensive stroke care and neuroscience services, was the first medical center in the Northeast to utilize CyberKnife robotic image-guided technology. Located on the Overlook campus, the Atlantic Neuroscience Institute is the region's leader in neuroscience care. Overlook Medical Center achieved Magnet® recognition from the American Nurses Credentialing Center, the highest national honor for nursing excellence. It has advanced certification from The Joint Commission for perinatal care, behavioral health care, spine surgery, wound care, and primary care medical home (PCMH).

Atlantic Health Medical Pavilions are facilities that provide primary and specialty care, screening and diagnostic services that are located outside the system's medical centers. Currently, there are Medical Pavilions located in Clark, Mountain Lakes, Rockaway and Paramus.

== Services ==
Atlantic Health provides care in the following specialty areas:

Bariatrics - Atlantic Health System has a medical and surgical weight loss program that includes psychological, nutritional and exercise support.

Behavioral Health - Atlantic Behavioral Health offers mental health, substance abuse and inpatient programs for adolescents and adults.

Cancer Care - The Carol G. Simon Cancer Center houses the system's oncology treatment, prevention, clinical trials and research programs.

Children's Health - Goryeb Children's Hospital is the hub of children's health at Atlantic Health System with pediatric specialty areas.

Digestive Diseases – U.S. News & World Report rated Morristown Medical Center a high-performing hospital in gastroenterology and GI surgery.

Emergency Services - Each medical center in the system contains an ER and many locations offer stroke care, pediatric emergency care, cardiovascular services, diagnostic imaging and fast-track areas for the treatment of minor injuries and illnesses.

Heart Care - The Gagnon Cardiovascular Institute is home to the largest cardiac surgery program in New Jersey and is ranked as one of the 40 best hospitals in the nation for cardiology and heart surgery by US News & World Report.

Neuroscience - The Atlantic Neuroscience Institute is recognized by Healthgrades as one of America's 100 Best Hospitals for Stroke and recognized Overlook Medical Center among the top five percent of hospitals in the U.S. for excellence in the treatment of Stroke, Cranial Neurosurgery and Neurosciences.

Orthopedics - The Atlantic Orthopedic Institute includes multidisciplinary treatments that span pre-surgical education through post-operative rehabilitation.

Pulmonary Services - The Atlantic Respiratory Institute offers diagnostic and treatments for a wide variety of respiratory conditions.

Senior Services - Atlantic Health System offers a variety of geriatric services at Morristown Medical Center's David and Joan Powell Center for Healthy Aging, Overlook Medical Center, Newton Medical Center and Chilton Medical Center.

Surgery - General, specialty and minimally invasive surgeries are performed by fellowship-trained, board-certified surgeons, anesthesiology specialists, nurses, and care managers.

Visiting Nurse Services - Atlantic Visiting Nurse supports patients recovering from illness or surgery, those coping with chronic conditions, families facing end-of-life care, and older adults needing help to remain living independently.

Women's Health - Atlantic Health provides specialized women's health services for every stage of life. Morristown Medical Center was ranked one of the 40 best hospitals in the nation for gynecology by U.S. News & World Report.
