= Walker-Combs-Hartshorne Farmstead =

Historic house in New Jersey, United States

- Walker, Combs, Hartshorne, Oakley Farmstead
- U.S. National Register of Historic Places
- New Jersey Register of Historic Places
- Oakley Farmhouse, 2021

- Location within Monmouth County, New Jersey Location within New Jersey Location within the United States
- Location: 189 Wemrock Road, West Freehold, Freehold Township, New Jersey
- Coordinates: 40°14′57″N 74°18′30″W
- Area: 6 acres (2.4 ha)
- Built: c. 1686
- Architectural style: Vernacular
- NRHP reference No.: 90001474
- NJRHP No.: 1978

Significant dates
- Added to NRHP: October 4, 1990
- Designated NJRHP: August 14, 1990

The Walker, Combs, Hartshorne, Oakley Farmstead (also known simply as the Oakley Farmhouse) is located in the historic district of the village of West Freehold, a part of Freehold Township in Monmouth County, New Jersey, United States.

The house was built in 1686 and was added to the National Register of Historic Places on October 14, 1990.

== History ==
As the English were beginning to have the tides in their favor against the Dutch during the Second Anglo-Dutch War, many religious dissenters from New England and other points north began to inhabit New Jersey and places south. Colonel Richard Nicolls granted a triangular tract of land called the Monmouth Tract (also called the Navesink Tract) on April 8, 1665. The original settlers were twelve men, most of whom were Baptists and Quakers from Long Island, Rhode Island, and Massachusetts, whom purchased this tract of land that extended from Sandy Hook to the mouth of the Raritan River, upstream approximately 25 miles (40 km), and then southeast to Barnegat Bay. Of the three original towns in Monmouth County were, Middletown, Shrewsbury, and Freehold. By the 1680s, the Freehold area had become a place of refuge for Scottish settlers of Presbyterian faith.

It was in the western section of the township where The Burlington Path traversed through, a stagecoach route meant to connect Burlington, which was at the time the Capital of West Jersey, and Perth Amboy, which was at the time the Capital of East Jersey. The proximity to various points of the state through this transportation artery along with the fertile soil that was optimal for cultivation, made the settlement of West Freehold an attractable place to live. Operating for centuries, The Walker, Combs, Hartshorne, Oakley Farmstead is the earliest remaining farmstead in Freehold and is one of the oldest preserved structures in Monmouth County. Settled in the 1680s, the property was originally situated on roughly 500 acres (200 ha) of land. The property was originally owned by East Jersey proprietors (whom were among the first to inhabit the Monmouth Tract), including John Barclay and Robert Barclay. Since then, the farmstead had been transferred/sold by multiple families including; Barclay, Reid, Bowne, Clark, Walker, Combs, Schanck, Hartshorne, and Oakley. In 1699, Robert Barclay sold the 500 acres to John Reid. In 1701, John Reid sold a portion of the estate, 200 acres (81 ha) of land to John Bowne. In 1706 John Bowne sold those 200 acres to the Clark Family, Richard and Anne Clark. The family built an 8’x10’ log cabin with a fieldstone foundation and enlarged the cabin to a 20’x25’ house with post and beam construction.

By the 1710s or 1720s, George Walker bought the 200 acres of property that encompassed the farmhouse and barn, and in 1729 the 300 acres of remaining farmland. Three generations of Walkers had lived on the farm for decades, along with their extended families which included many of whom were Patriots during the American Revolutionary War. In 1801, Elijah Combs bought the farmstead from the Walkers, in which he was able to allow the farm to flourish. The huge immediate family of Elijah Combs, prompted him to build the western half of the house, bringing the home to its current dimensions.

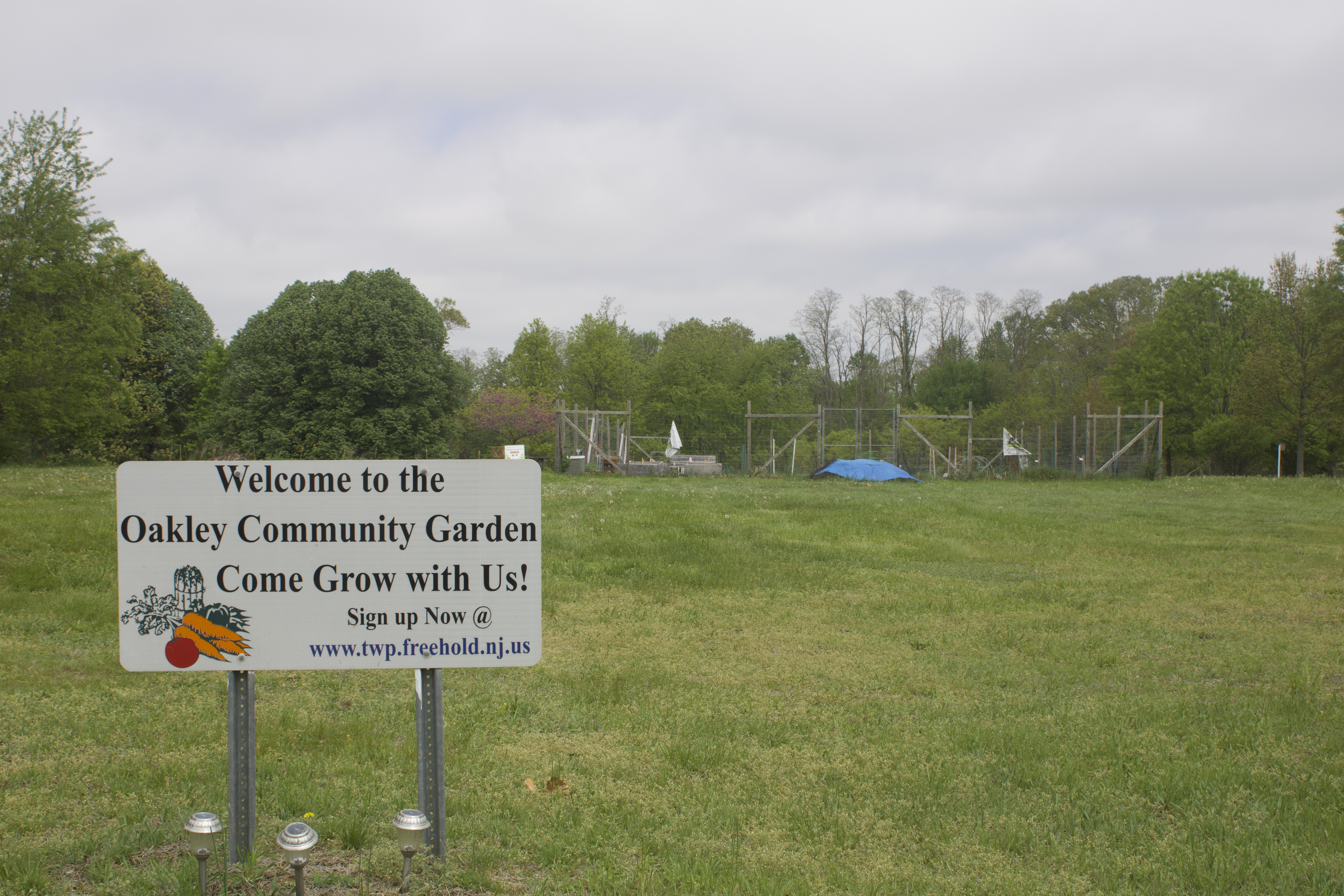
Oakley Community Garden

In 1832, Elijah Combs sold the property to Ruliff Reed Schanck, which he owned for a brief period of time. In 1842 Richard Salter Hartshorne, Jr. purchased the farm and in 1850 he added the Italianate porch to the front of the house. The farmstead remained successful under the ownership of the Hartshornes during the Gilded Age, in 1911 it was sold for $32,000.00 to the last family of ownership, the Oakley family. Charles Oakley Jr. made some extensive renovations to the house, the interior and the exterior, before dying in 1932. With Charles' son predeceasing him by two years, the farm was owned and managed by his wife, Elizabeth, and his daughter, Elizabeth. Despite struggling through the Great Depression, the farm remained profitable by selling their produce to new markets. By 1981, the farmstead was the largest operating farm in Monmouth County.

Elizabeth Oakley was the last to manage and inhabit the farmstead. While continuing to successfully manage the farmstead, Elizabeth was also fascinated in the farmstead's rich history. She worked hard to preserve it, having accomplished her life's goal in having the farm be placed in the U.S. National Register of Historic Places in 1990. Elizabeth Oakley died in her home on April 22, 1995. In 1997, the 6 remaining acres were sold to the Township of Freehold by Hugh Oakley (the nephew of Elizabeth). The home remains an historic landmark in the township, located on Wemrock Road. Despite massive suburban development in the last half century, the township has worked hard in the preservation of farmland. Particularly, on the premises of the property is a community garden operated by the township, continuing the farmstead's agricultural legacy.

=== Toll House ===
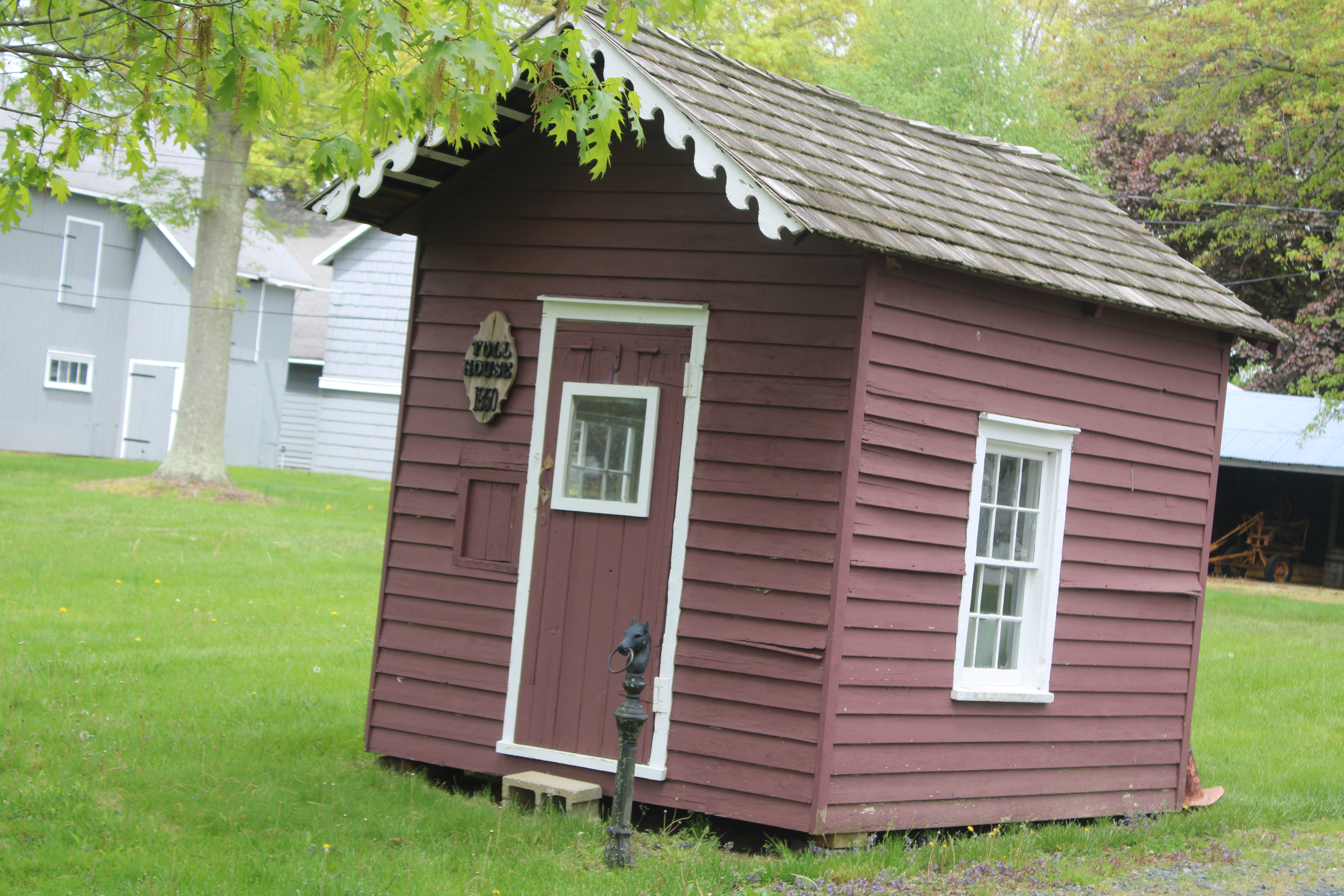
Toll house on the Oakley Farm

The Toll House located on the property of the Walker, Combs, Hartshorne, Oakley Farmstead is one of only two remaining toll houses that are left within the State of New Jersey. Built in ca. 1850, it was owned and operated by a group of farmers living along the Burlington Path. The toll separated two sides of the two-lane stagecoach route; the side of the tollroad heading southwest towards Smithburg was known as the 'Freehold-Smithburg Turnpike' and the other side of the tollroad heading northeast towards 'Elk's Point' (what is now Freehold Borough).
