= Arthur E. Baird =

Arthur Earl Baird (5 September 1895 – 18 August 1985) better known as Dr. Craig Earl, was an American radio game show host in the 1930s and 1940s.

Arthur E. Baird (alias "Dr. Craig Earl") as "Professor Quiz", circa 1940.

Born in Medford, Massachusetts, United States, Baird hosted Professor Quiz from May 9, 1936, until the show concluded July 17, 1948.

Baird claimed to have a degree in theology from Tufts University (in fact, he attended the college for two years but left without a diploma), and did an early exercise and health program on Boston radio in the early 1920s under that name. He claimed to be an orphan; however, his 1918 draft card recorded him as "living at home in Medford with his folks and attending college". By 1935, Baird was married, but during that year he suddenly vanished.

As it turned out, Baird's disappearance was manufactured so he could avoid paying alimony or child support to his wife. He later made his way to New York City and masqueraded as "Dr. Craig Earl", scholar and world traveler, taking the job as "quizmaster" on Professor Quiz in 1936. The identity of "Professor Quiz" was a closely guarded secret until a Radio Daily article revealed him to be "Dr. Craig Earl" in 1937. In 1942, when his real identity was discovered, Baird was ordered to pay more than $25,000 to his ex-wife. By this point, Baird had remarried, and his new wife assisted him on his quiz show, working as the scorekeeper.

In spite of the fairly widespread bad publicity, Baird continued to use the Earl identity, and his radio career continued. Sometime after leaving the air, Baird apparently legally changed his name to Craig Earl; he died in 1985.
