= West Freehold, New Jersey =

Census-designated place in New Jersey, United States

- Census-designated place
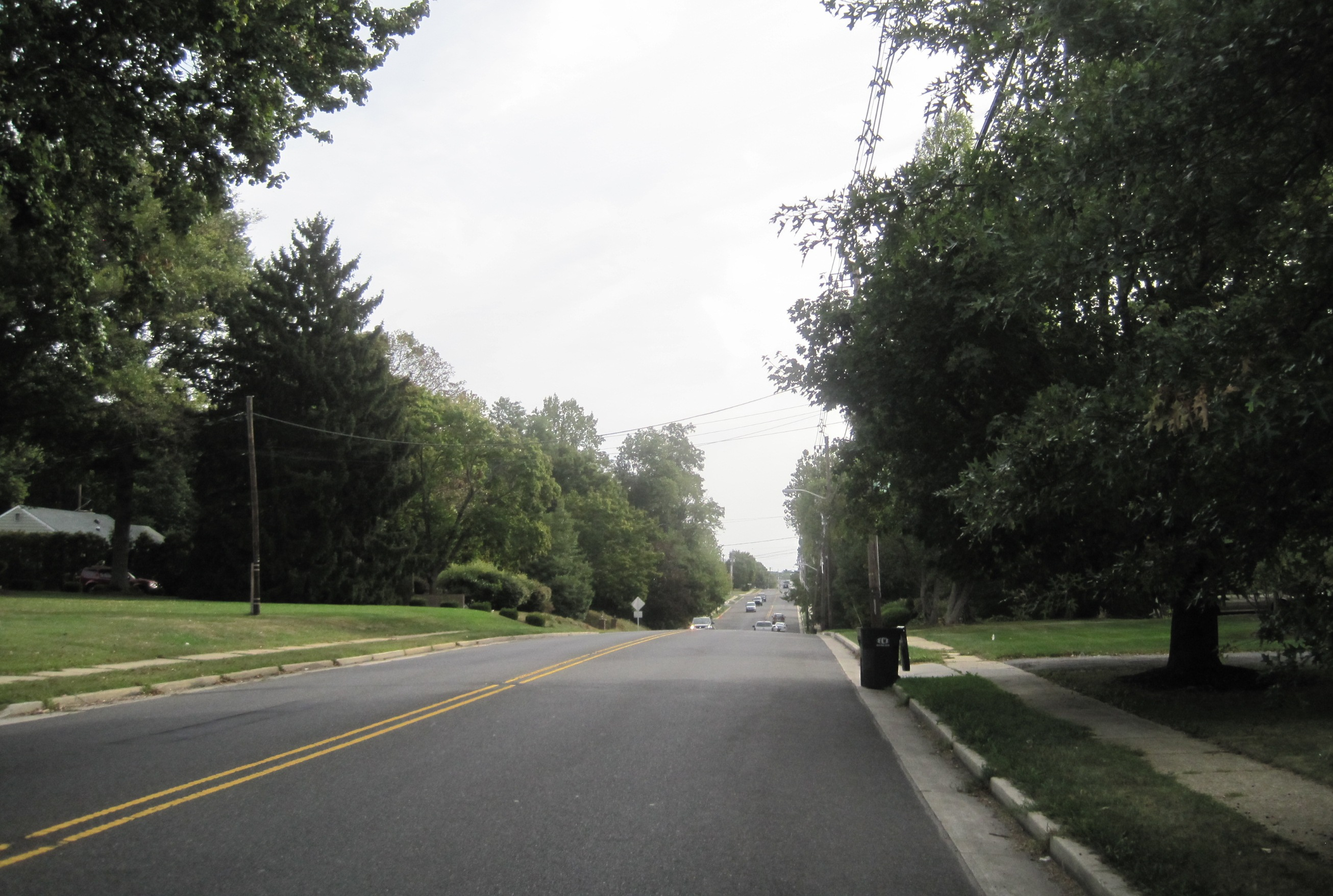
- Along Schanck Road in the neighborhood of Stonehurst East

- Map of West Freehold highlighted with in Monmouth County. Right: Location of Monmouth County in New Jersey.

- Location in Monmouth County Location in New Jersey Location in the United States
- Coordinates: 40.230905°N 74.294073°W
- Country: United States
- State: New Jersey
- County: Monmouth
- Township: Freehold

Area
  - Total: 5.93 sq mi (15.35 km^{2})
  - Land: 5.91 sq mi (15.31 km^{2})
  - Water: 0.015 sq mi (0.04 km^{2}) 0.24%
- Elevation: 141 ft (43 m)

Population (2020)
  - Total: 13,596
  - Density: 2,299.3/sq mi (887.76/km^{2})
- Time zone: UTC−05:00 (Eastern (EST))
  - Summer (DST): UTC−04:00 (Eastern (EDT))
- ZIP Code: 07728 (Freehold)
- Area codes: 732/848
- FIPS code: 34-79100
- GNIS feature ID: 02390471

West Freehold is an unincorporated community and census-designated place (CDP) within Freehold Township, in Monmouth County, New Jersey, United States. As of the 2020 census, the CDP's population was 13,596. Due to the community's proximity to the Battle of Monmouth, West Freehold is home to several important historical structures, which have been preserved in the West Freehold Village Historic District.

== History ==
New Jersey became a colony of England on June 24, 1664, after the Duke of York granted a patent to Sir George Carteret and Lord John Berkely for what is now New Jersey.

West Freehold (also historically known as "Mount's Corner") was settled as early as the late seventeenth century primarily by English and Scottish Presbyterians, Baptists, and Quakers escaping religious persecution from Scotland and nearby New England. A major transportation artery that was located in West Freehold was the Burlington Path, a stagecoach route that connected Burlington, which was at the time the capital of West Jersey, and Perth Amboy, which was at the time the capital of East Jersey. Much of modern-day Monmouth Road/West Main Street (County Route 537) coincides in general direction and trajectory with this historic stagecoach route. Many colonial-era structures are still standing in the West Freehold Village Historic District, near the intersection of West Main Street and Stillwells Corner Road/Wemrock Road.

The Battle of Monmouth during the American Revolutionary War was fought in countryside less than 2 miles (3 km) northwest of West Freehold.

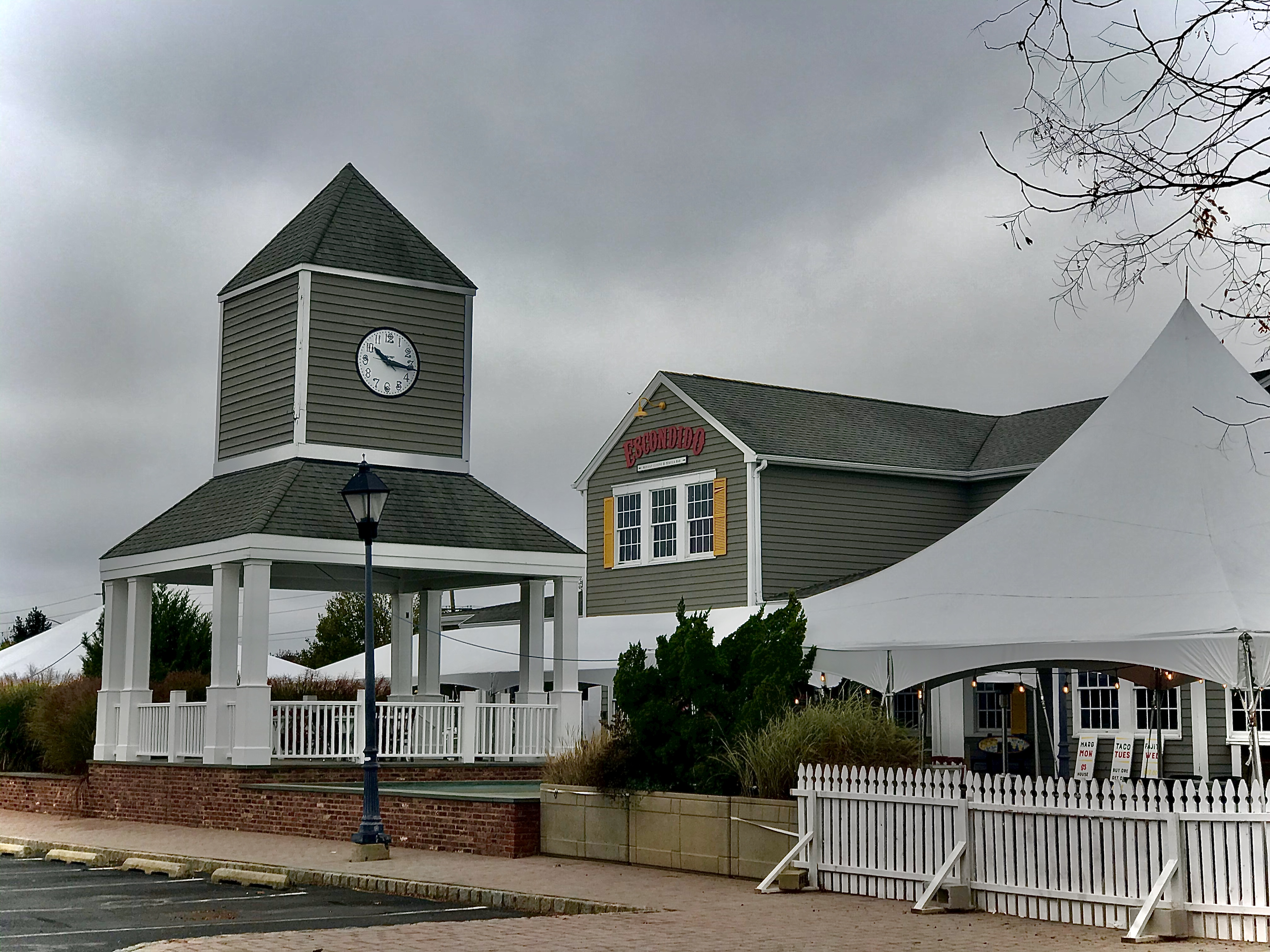
Escondido Restaurant in the historic district of West Freehold, located next to Moore's Tavern & Restaurant

=== Mount's Tavern ===
Today known as Moore's Tavern & Restaurant, this tavern at the corner of Main Street and Stillwells Corner Road is one of the most well-known historic structures in Freehold Township. As a stagecoach stop for the Burlington Path, there is documentation of the tavern's license being renewed from 1787, suggesting that the tavern was in use prior to that. Moses Mount, a private during the Revolutionary War and aide to George Washington, was the inn's first keeper.

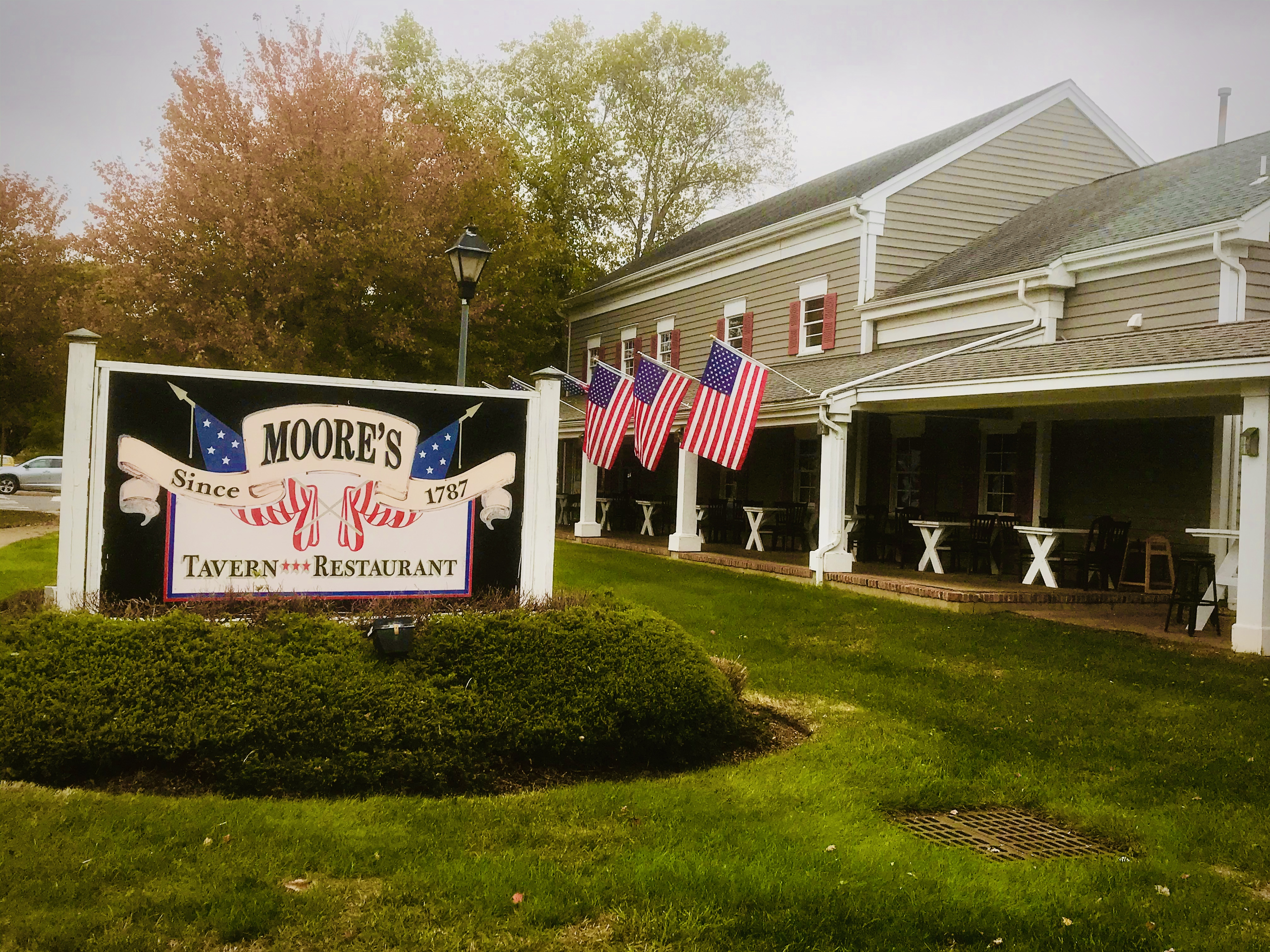
Moore's Tavern in the historic district of West Freehold since 1787

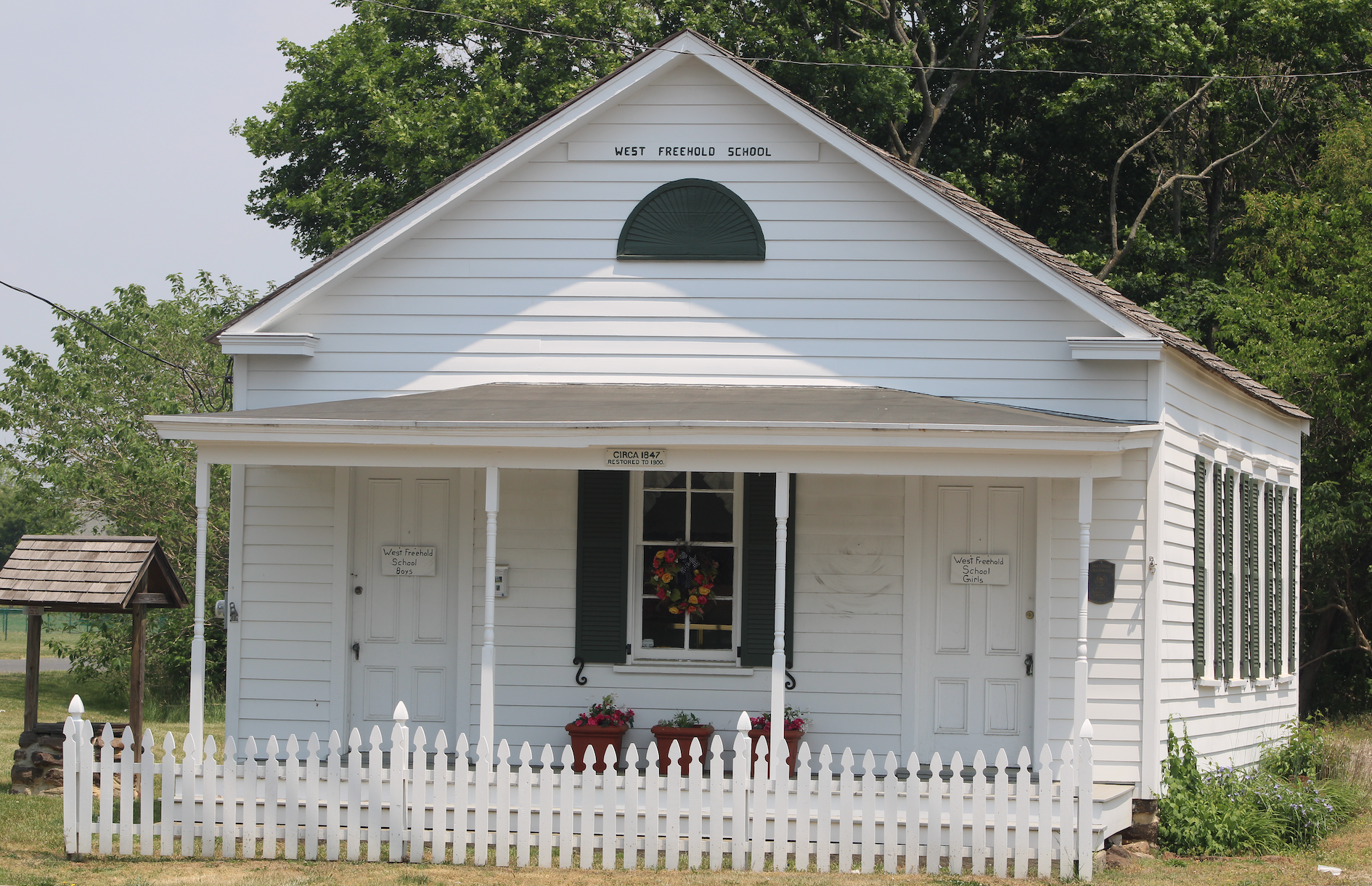
West Freehold schoolhouse

=== Levi Solomon Farmstead ===
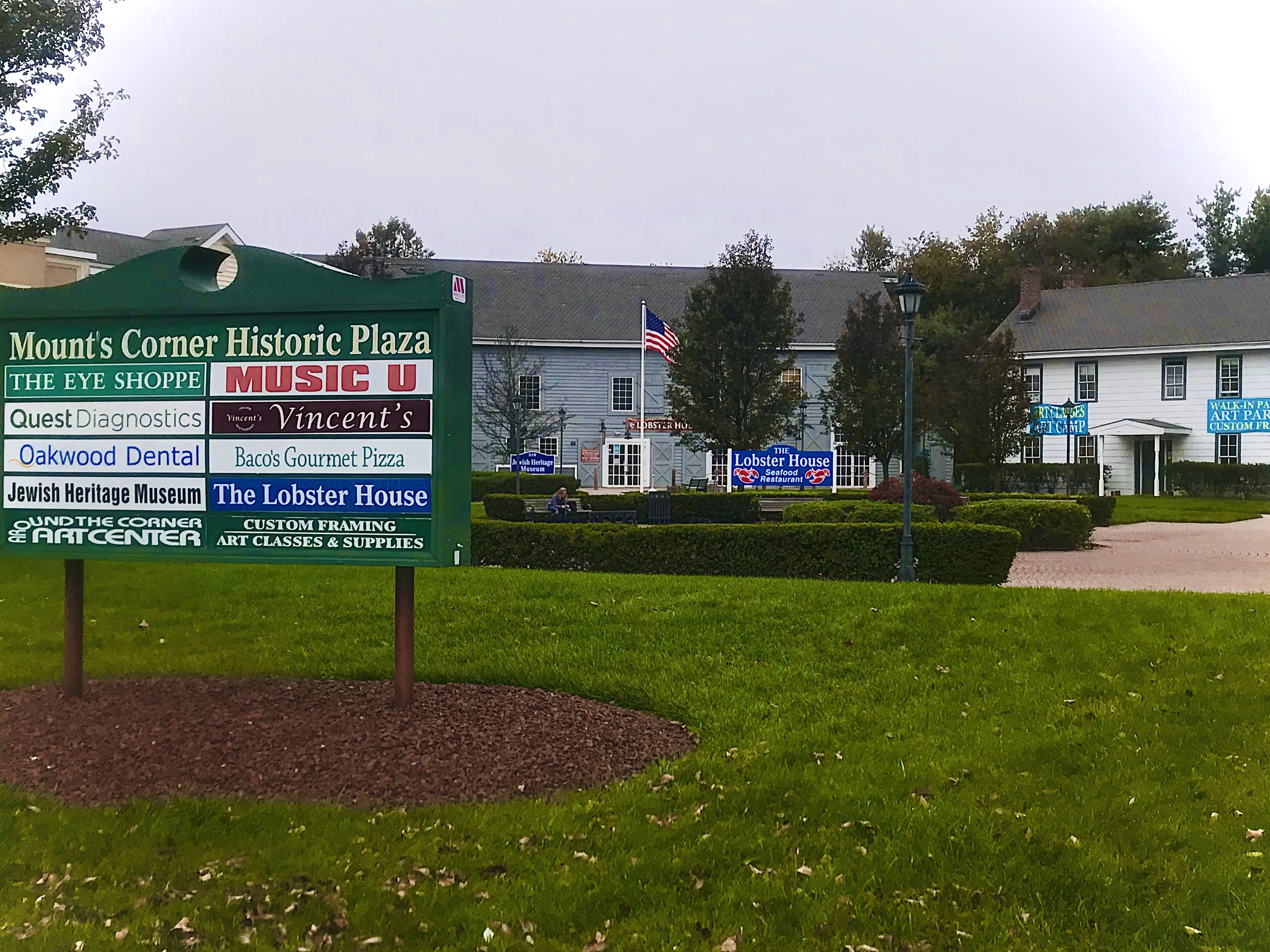
Mount's Corner Historic Plaza with the Jewish Heritage Museum in the background

Freehold Township in its early days was a place of refuge for persecuted religious groups, such as Presbyterians, Baptists, and Quakers. The Solomon family were some of New Jersey's earliest Jewish settlers. They settled on a large piece of farmland, roughly where much of the present Mount's Corner Shopping Center is located, as early as 1720. During the Battle of Monmouth, their dwelling suffered significant damage from invading British troops. Luckily, matriarch Hannah Solomon, who was widowed, and her two sons were able to save their house after it was set on fire. The original barn that was built on the farm in the 1800s is now the location of the Monmouth County Jewish Heritage Museum, "dedicated to the promotion of public awareness of the county's Jewish heritage for the education and enjoyment of both children and adults."

=== West Freehold Schoolhouse ===
Located at what is now Wemrock Road, adjacent to West Main Street, this schoolhouse was built in 1848 and educated the children that lived within the community until 1937. The property was part of the Rulif R. Schanck Farmstead, which is now the Elizabeth Oakley Farm (Museum).

=== Walker, Combs, Hartshorne, Oakley Farmstead ===
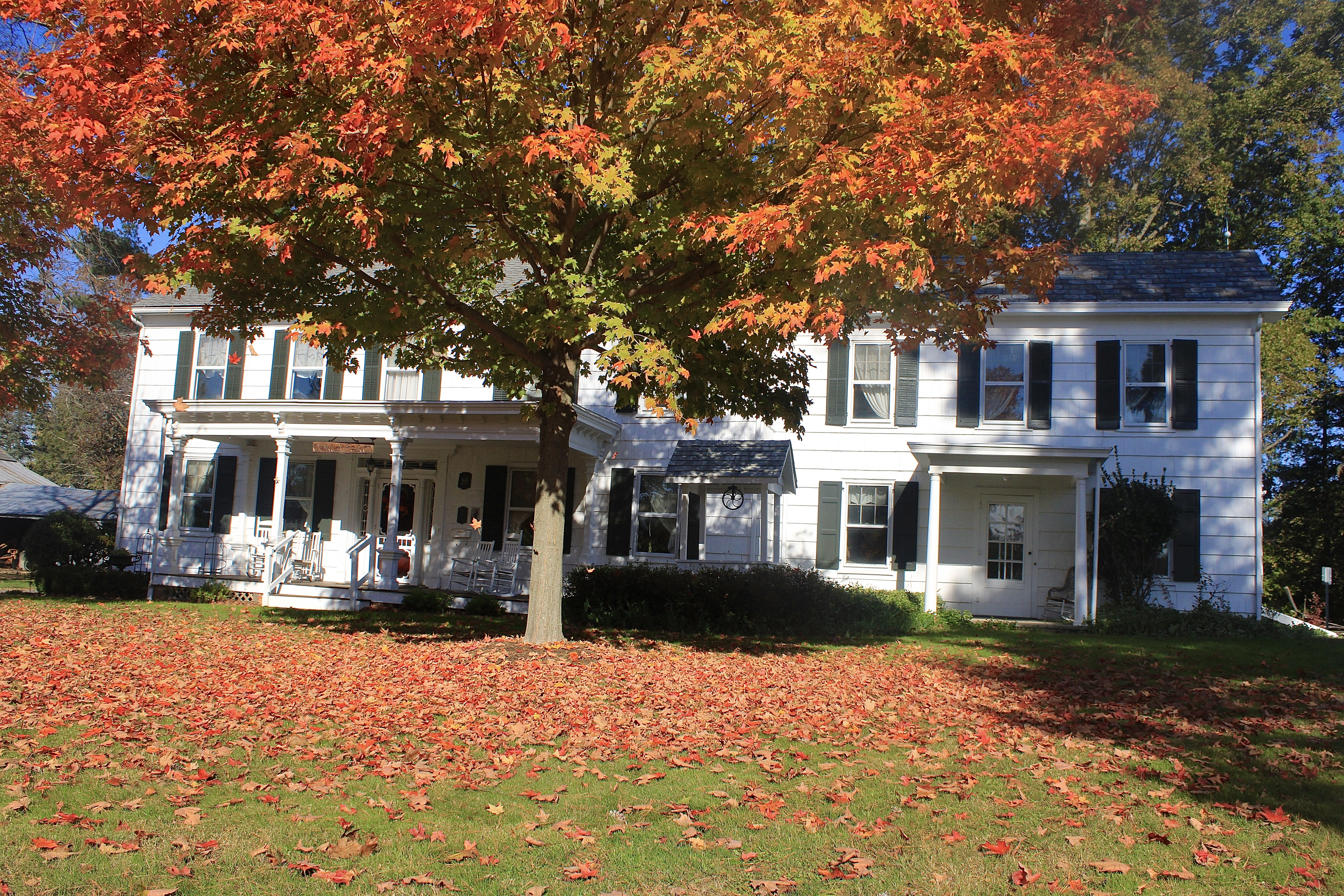
The Oakley Farmhouse in autumn

Operated for centuries, this property is the earliest remaining farmstead in Freehold and is one of the oldest preserved structures in Monmouth County. Settled in 1686, the property was situated on 110 acres (45 ha) of land, owned by East Jersey proprietors John Barclay, Robert Barclay, John Reid and John Bowne. Since then, the farmstead had been transferred/sold by multiple families, including Barclay, Reid, Bowne, Clark, Walker, Combs, Schanck, Hartshorne, and Oakley.

By 1981, the farmstead was the largest operating farm in Monmouth County. At that time, Elizabeth Oakley was the last to inhabit the structure and was fascinated in the home's rich history. She worked hard to preserve it, having accomplished her life's goal in having the farm added to the National Register of Historic Places in 1990.

=== Toll House ===
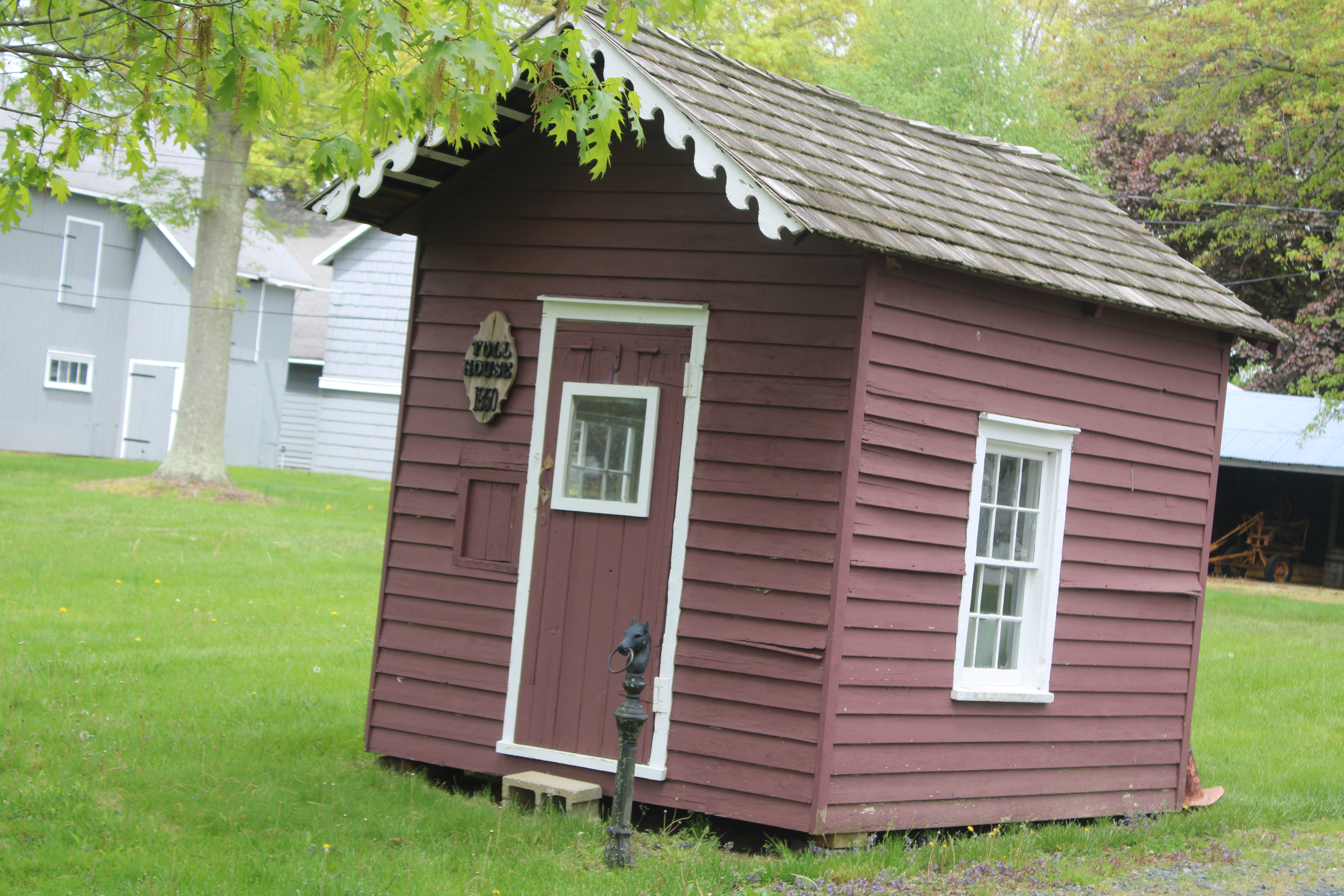
Toll house on the Oakley Farm

The Toll House located on the property of the Walker, Combs, Hartshorne, Oakley Farmstead is one of only two remaining toll houses in New Jersey. Built in ca. 1850, it was owned and operated by a group of farmers living along the Burlington Path. The toll separated two sides of the two-lane stagecoach route: the side heading southwest towards Smithburg, known as the Freehold-Smithburg Turnpike, and the side heading northeast towards "Elk's Point" (what is now Freehold Borough).

== Geography ==
West Freehold is in central Monmouth County and central Freehold Township. It is 1 to 3 miles (2 to 5 km) southwest of Freehold Borough, the Monmouth county seat. The New Jersey Route 33 freeway forms the northern edge of the West Freehold CDP, while U.S. Route 9 passes through the east side of the community. Route 33 leads east 15 miles (24 km) to its terminus at Ocean Grove and west 11 miles (18 km) to the New Jersey Turnpike at Hightstown, while US 9 leads north past Freehold Borough 20 miles (32 km) to Perth Amboy and south 21 miles (34 km) to Toms River.

Monmouth Battlefield State Park is 2 miles (3 km) northwest of the historic center of West Freehold.

According to the U.S. Census Bureau, the West Freehold CDP had a total area of 5.927 square miles (15.35 km^{2}), including 5.913 square miles (15.31 km^{2}) of land and 0.014 square miles (0.036 km^{2}) of water (0.24%).

=== Neighborhoods ===
There are many residential neighborhoods in West Freehold, consisting mainly of single-family homes. The two largest neighborhoods are Stonehurst East and Stonehurst West. The homes in Stonehurst were primarily built in the 1960s and 1970s, on large swaths of former farmland.

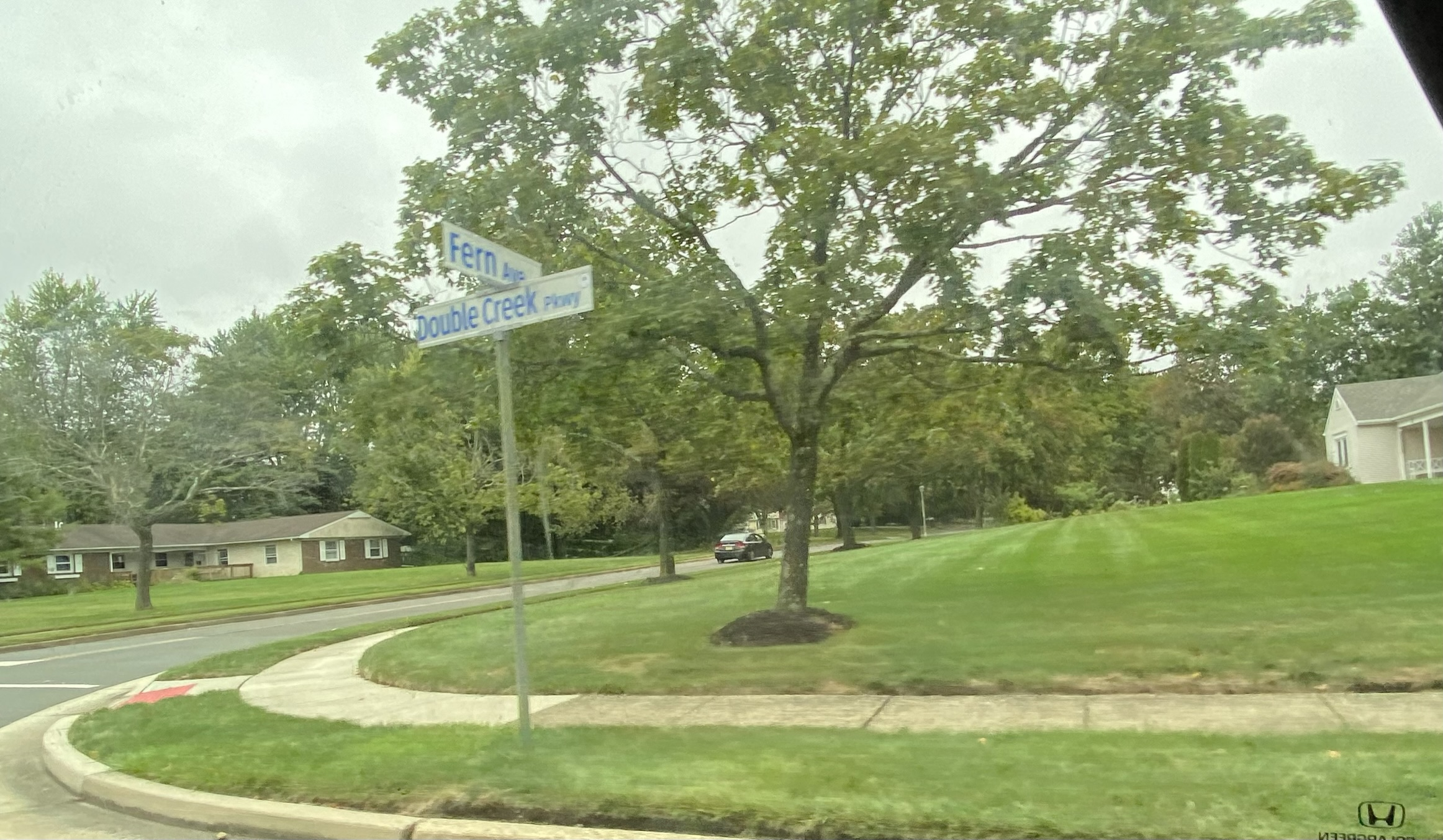
The neighborhood of Stonehurst West at the intersection of Double Creek Parkway and Fern Avenue

Raintree is a mixed-use lifestyle center centrally located near County Route 537. The gated community features condominiums that were built in the 1980s and 1990s, along with a wide array of amenities offered to its residents. The Raintree Town Center is the shopping center in the area.

== Demographics ==
Historical population
Census	Pop.	Note	%±
1980	9,929		—
1990	11,166		12.5%
2000	12,498		11.9%
2010	13,613		8.9%
2020	13,596		−0.1%
Population sources: 1950 1960 1970; 1980 1990 2000; 2010 2020

West Freehold first appeared as a census designated place in the 1980 U.S. census.

=== 2020 census ===
As of the 2020 census, West Freehold had a population of 13,596. The median age was 43.6 years. 21.8% of residents were under the age of 18 and 17.4% of residents were 65 years of age or older. For every 100 females there were 89.5 males, and for every 100 females age 18 and over there were 86.9 males age 18 and over.

There were 5,015 households in West Freehold, of which 33.4% had children under the age of 18 living in them. Of all households, 58.5% were married-couple households, 12.6% were households with a male householder and no spouse or partner present, and 25.6% were households with a female householder and no spouse or partner present. About 23.2% of all households were made up of individuals and 11.0% had someone living alone who was 65 years of age or older.

There were 5,185 housing units, of which 3.3% were vacant. The homeowner vacancy rate was 0.8% and the rental vacancy rate was 5.2%.

Racial composition as of the 2020 census
Race	Number	Percent
White	10,798	79.4%
Black or African American	476	3.5%
American Indian and Alaska Native	44	0.3%
Asian	759	5.6%
Native Hawaiian and Other Pacific Islander	2	0.0%
Some other race	530	3.9%
Two or more races	987	7.3%
Hispanic or Latino (of any race)	1,457	10.7%

=== 2010 census ===
The 2010 United States census counted 13,613 people, 4,941 households, and 3,612 families in the CDP. The population density was 2,302.3 people per square mile (888.9 people/km^{2}). There were 5,108 housing units at an average density of 863.9 units per square mile (333.6 units/km^{2}). The racial makeup was 87.06% (11,851) White, 3.17% (431) Black or African American, 0.22% (30) Native American, 6.19% (842) Asian, 0.01% (1) Pacific Islander, 1.59% (217) from other races, and 1.77% (241) from two or more races. Hispanic or Latino of any race were 8.13% (1,107) of the population.

Of the 4,941 households, 35.9% had children under the age of 18; 61.0% were married couples living together; 9.1% had a female householder with no husband present and 26.9% were non-families. Of all households, 23.0% were made up of individuals and 8.8% had someone living alone who was 65 years of age or older. The average household size was 2.73 and the average family size was 3.26.

25.1% of the population were under the age of 18, 7.0% from 18 to 24, 24.0% from 25 to 44, 29.6% from 45 to 64, and 14.2% who were 65 years of age or older. The median age was 41.4 years. For every 100 females, the population had 91.8 males. For every 100 females ages 18 and older there were 89.5 males.

=== 2000 census ===
As of the 2000 United States census there were 12,498 people, 4,659 households, and 3,429 families living in the CDP. The population density was 822.1 people/km^{2} (2,129 people/mi^{2}). There were 4,740 housing units at an average density of 311.8 units/km^{2} (808 units/mi^{2}). The racial makeup of the CDP was 90.68% White, 2.46% African American, 0.15% Native American, 4.28% Asian, 0.02% Pacific Islander, 1.13% from other races, and 1.27% from two or more races. Hispanic or Latino of any race were 5.38% of the population.

There were 4,659 households, out of which 32.9% had children under the age of 18 living with them, 63.1% were married couples living together, 7.8% had a female householder with no husband present, and 26.4% were non-families. 22.6% of all households were made up of individuals, and 6.4% had someone living alone who was 65 years of age or older. The average household size was 2.62 and the average family size was 3.10.

In the CDP the population was spread out, with 23.8% under the age of 18, 5.3% from 18 to 24, 29.4% from 25 to 44, 28.1% from 45 to 64, and 13.4% who were 65 years of age or older. The median age was 40 years. For every 100 females, there were 92.2 males. For every 100 females age 18 and over, there were 88.1 males.

The median income for a household in the CDP was $72,577, and the median income for a family was $87,609. Males had a median income of $62,074 versus $36,563 for females. The per capita income for the CDP was $33,218. About 3.7% of families and 4.7% of the population were below the poverty line, including 6.0% of those under age 18 and 5.4% of those age 65 or over.

== Infrastructure ==
=== Transportation ===
New Jersey Transit provides local bus transportation on the 307 route. It also provides bus transportation to the Port Authority Bus Terminal in Midtown Manhattan on the 139 route, and to the Newark/Jersey City/Hoboken area on the 67 route. Major roads that run through the CDP include Monmouth Road/West Main Street (County Route 537) within the heart of the community and home to numerous businesses, Elton-Adelphia Road (County Route 524) on the community's southern edge near Turkey Swamp Park, U.S. Route 9, which also happens to feature numerous businesses, on the eastern edge, New Jersey Route 79 at the northeastern corner, and the New Jersey Route 33 freeway, known as the "Freehold Bypass", on the community's northern edge with interchanges at Wemrock Road, CR 537, and US 9/Route 79.

=== Healthcare ===
CentraState Medical Center is affiliated with Rutgers Robert Wood Johnson Medical School. The facility has 287 beds and is part of CentraState Healthcare System, the county's fourth-largest employer. It is located on West Main Street (County Route 537).
