= George Washington Jr. =

American businessman and inventor

George Washington Jr. (August 1899 – December 27, 1966) served for a time as treasurer of the G. Washington Coffee Company started by his father, George Washington. He was also an inventor, patenting a photoengraving process for newspapers that was introduced by Fairchild Camera and Instrument in 1948.

== Biography ==
He was born in August 1899 in New York City to George Washington. He attended the Polytechnic Preparatory Country Day School in Brooklyn, New York City and the Milford School. He served in the Army Signal Corps during World War I.

He married Marian Engel.

He served as treasurer of the G. Washington Coffee Company.

He was also an inventor. He patented a photoengraving process for newspapers that was introduced by Fairchild Camera and Instrument in 1948.

He died at Morristown Memorial Hospital in Morristown, New Jersey on December 27, 1966.
