= Uncle Jim's Question Bee =

Radio quiz program

A Quiz Book based on Uncle Jim's Question Bee

Uncle Jim's Question Bee was a radio quiz program, hosted by Jim McWilliams, which began on the Blue Network in 1936 and continued until 1941.

After the success of Professor Quiz, radio's first quiz show which began four months earlier, Uncle Jim's Question Bee was broadcasting's second quiz program. The questions came from listeners. Three men and three women were chosen from the audience by the show's publicist, Adele Wesley, to become the contestants competing for the $25 prize money.

== Schedule ==
Sponsored by George Washington Coffee, the half-hour program premiered September 26, 1936, and ran until December 16, 1939, airing on Saturday evenings at 7:30pm. George Washington Coffee also sponsored Professor Quiz. The following year it was sponsored by Lever Brothers (Spry), as it moved to Tuesdays (and later Wednesdays at 8pm) on CBS, where it was heard from June 18 to October 2, 1940, as a summer replacement show for Big Town. It returned to the Blue Network for a run from October 8, 1940, to July 8, 1941, still sponsored by Lever Brothers but hosted by Bill Slater.

== Television ==
A special telecast of the show was shown on the formal commercial television debut of NBC (WNBT in NY). This one-time event was seen July 1, 1941, preceding Truth or Consequences that evening as first commercial TV game show telecast.

== Products ==
The program generated tie-in merchandising, including Uncle Jim's Question Bee Game, which was given to both contestants and those who sent in questions. Listeners could also purchase a Q&A book, Uncle Jim's Question Bee Quiz Book. Jim McWilliams was seen on the front cover.
