= Professor Quiz =

US radio program

This vintage punchboard tie-in with the Professor Quiz radio series was distributed to taverns in the mid-1940s.

Professor Quiz was radio's first true quiz program, broadcast with many different sponsors from 1936 to 1948 on CBS and ABC. The program featured Professor Quiz, his wife Betty, and his son, Professor Quiz Jr. The program's announcer was Robert Trout.

The show began on May 9, 1936, sponsored by George Washington Coffee, on a limited CBS hook-up from Washington, D.C., expanding to the full network on September 18, 1936 from New York. George Washington Coffee also sponsored Uncle Jim's Question Bee, radio's second quiz show which began four months after the debut of Professor Quiz. Arthur Godfrey was a host of the program in 1937. The series moved to ABC on January 24, 1946, continuing until the last program on July 17, 1948.

From the program's debut until August 1938, it averaged receiving about 15,000 letters from listeners each week.

The program's format pitted five people from the audience against each other for several rounds of questions until the winner received a cash prize. Additional prizes went to some listeners who sent in questions that were used on the air. Each winner received $25 in silver dollars, and the runner-up received 15 silver dollars. By September 1947, more than 2500 contestants had received more than $100,000 on the program.

The quizmaster, Professor Quiz, was Dr. Craig Earle, a pseudonym for Arthur E. Baird.

Sponsors included Velvet Pipe and Cigarette Tobacco and Kelvinator appliances.

In February 1940, a Professor Quiz home game was available with the purchase of a bottle of Teel (a liquid dentifrice). The game included a 52-page book that contained 600 questions from the radio program and a spinner that players used to select questions.
