= Baltusrol Valley =

The Baltusrol Valley is in Morris County, New Jersey and Somerset County, New Jersey. It used to be known as Green Brook Valley. It is part of the Raritan River watershed.

== See also ==
- Baltusrol Golf Club
- Raritan Valley
