= Chilton Memorial Hospital =

Hospital in New Jersey, United States

Atlantic Health Chilton Medical Center
- Atlantic Health

Geography
- Location: Pompton Plains, New Jersey, United States
- Coordinates: 40.958423°N 74.309623°W

Organization
- Type: General

Services
- Beds: 260

History
- Opened: 1947

Links
- Website: www.chiltonhealth.org
- Lists: Hospitals in New Jersey

Atlantic Health Chilton Medical Center is a non-profit acute care community hospital in the Pompton Plains section of Pequannock Township, New Jersey. Located at 97 West Parkway, it is the only hospital serving the Pequannock Township area. In 2021 it was given a grade A by the Leapfrog patient safety organization.

== History ==
=== "Old Chilton" ===
In 1947, Forrest S. Chilton Jr., MD and his wife, Elizabeth, a registered nurse, donated land located on Newark-Pompton Turnpike with the vision of building a hospital. At the time, Chilton was the only doctor in the area and was operating a maternity ward in his home's attic.

During its infancy, Chilton obtained funding from his business associate Aniello Vitale, and raised additional capital from the community and patients by soliciting donations door to door, via a contribution jar in his office and contributing from his own income. In 1954, the facility opened with fifty beds, named in honor of his son, Forrest S. Chilton III, who died in World War II.

In 1961, it was expanded to a 119-bed facility.

Some people who remember or were born in the Newark-Pompton Turnpike building, which has since been turned into condominiums, affectionately refer to the original location by the nickname "The Old Chilton."

New York Yankees shortstop Derek Jeter was born at "Old Chilton" on June 26, 1974.Clint Wiest of C.W.C was born at "old Chilton" on April 3.1967.

=== Second facility ===
On November 20, 1971 a second facility was dedicated on West Parkway, where Chilton Medical Center still operates today.

Both buildings were used concurrently until 1984

The current facility on West Parkway houses 260 beds.

=== Mobile Intensive Care Unit (MICU) ===
Chilton Medical Center operates two advanced life support paramedic units and two basic life support ambulances. ALS 901 operates 24 hours a day while ALS 902 operates a 12-hour-a-day schedule (7a-7p). The ALS units operate out of two bases, one located on the hospital's property, the other in West Milford. BLS 931 operates from 6am- 6pm and BLS 932 operate from 7AM-7PM. Both BLS units are in service Monday through Friday and are stationed at the hospital. Chilton MICU's 200 + square miles of primary coverage represents the largest response area in the MICCOM consortium, with the department responding to over 5,000 calls per year for ALS. The BLS units respond to calls primarily for Pequannock Township and also provide mutual aid for surrounding communities of Lincoln Park, Pompton Lakes, Riverdale, Wanaque, Ringwood, West Milford, Kinnelon, Butler and Bloomingdale.

As of January 1, 2014, Chilton's EMS services were transferred under the control of Atlantic Ambulance Corporation.
