= Morristown Medical Center =

Atlantic Health Morristown Medical Center
- Atlantic Health

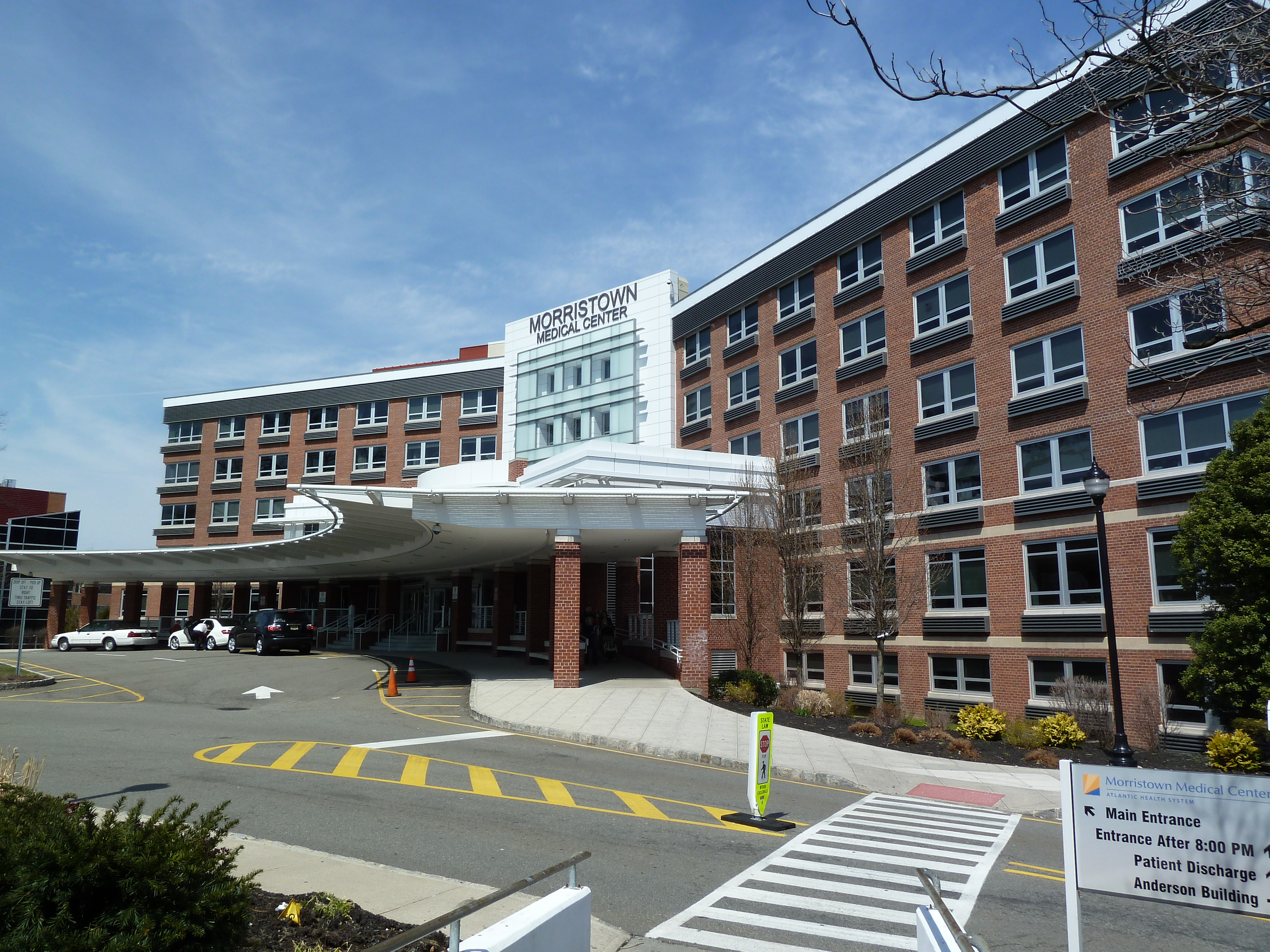

Geography
- Location: 100 Madison Ave; Morristown, New Jersey 07960; U.S.
- Coordinates: 40°47′22″N 74°27′55″W

Organisation
- Type: Teaching
- Affiliated university: Sidney Kimmel Medical College Robert Wood Johnson Medical School, Rowan-Virtua School of Osteopathic Medicine (additional affiliations)

Services
- Emergency department: Level II Trauma Center
- Beds: 735

Helipads
- Helipad: 7NJ5

History
- Founded: October 17, 1893

Links
- Website: Morristown Medical Center Website

Atlantic Health Morristown Medical Center is a 735 bed non-profit, tertiary, research and academic medical center located in Morristown, New Jersey, serving northern New Jersey and the New York metropolitan area. The hospital is the flagship facility of Atlantic Health and is the largest medical center in the system, as well as in Morris County and all of northwestern New Jersey. Morristown Medical Center is affiliated with the Sidney Kimmel School of Medicine at Thomas Jefferson University.

The facility is an American College of Surgeons designated Level I and Level 2 trauma center by the State of New Jersey and has a rooftop helipad to receive and dispatch medevac patients. Goryeb Children's Hospital is located on the campus of Morristown Medical Center and specializes in the treatment of infants, children, adolescents, and young adults up to the age of 21.

Morristown Medical Center was established on November 19, 1892, and opened to patients just under a year later. With approximately 7,000 employees, the medical center is Morristown's largest employer and one of the largest employers in all of Morris County.

== History ==
In 1889, Myra Brookfield bequeathed her home and property for the purpose of establishing a hospital. She stipulated that the community-at-large raise $15,000 to buy equipment and hire staff within three years of her death. In 1893, the house was too small for the hospital, so it was sold and the profits were put toward the purchase of a bigger facility – a former parsonage in downtown Morristown, used as a makeshift hospital by George Washington more than 100 years earlier.

Morristown Memorial Hospital opened its doors on October 17, 1893. Early on, the hospital established an isolation unit for patients with contagious diseases. As large-scale epidemics were a fact of life in 19th-century America, that ward helped to slow or prevent the spread of dangerous diseases in the community. In 1898 a new building for the hospital was donated by George Goelet Kip, named the Anna Margaret Home for Convalescents in honor of his late wife. By the turn of the century, Morristown Memorial had an operating room, X-ray equipment, a pathology lab and an outpatient clinic.

The hospital hired Jennie A. Dean, its first female doctor, to run the pathology lab in 1913, a full seven years before American women had the right to vote. Her sister, Elvira Dean, was hired to run the X-ray department.

- 1921 – The Outpatient Department opened its doors, a precursor to today's Emergency Department (although the hospital didn't replace its horse-drawn ambulance with a motorized one until 1924).
- 1938 – The hospital established a tumor section to study and treat cancer; that same year, radium therapy was introduced.
- 1952 – Morristown Memorial moved into a new facility on Madison Avenue. In the 1960s, the hospital doubled in size.
- 1962 – a wing was added to the hospital.
- 1973 – a wing was added to the hospital.
- 1996 – Overlook and Morristown Memorial hospitals joined forces as Atlantic Health.
- 2002 – Goryeb Children's Hospital opened adjacent to the Morristown Memorial Hospital campus.
- 2008 – Gagnon Cardiovascular Institute opened.
- 2009 – Morristown Memorial Hospital changed its name to Morristown Medical Center, part of Atlantic Health

In a ruling issued in June 2015, Tax Court Judge Vito Bianco ruled that the hospital would be required to pay property taxes on nearly all of its 40-acre (16 ha) campus.

In 2025, the hospital proposed a $1 billion expansion, which includes plans for a new 11-story, 483,000-square-foot building to accommodate 108 private rooms. Hospital executives said the expansion was needed in order to meet growing demand, increase capacity, and reduce wait times. However, the hospital expansion faced resistance from some local residents.

== Statistics ==
As of 2021, Morristown Medical Center includes:

- Employees: 6,483
- Physicians/Providers: 1,863
- Medical Residents: 219
- Licensed Beds: 735
- Admissions: 42,814
- Births: 4,954
- Emergency Visits: 93,362
- Outpatient Visits: 811,251

== Specialties ==
Morristown Medical Center is verified as a Level I Regional Trauma Center by the American College of Surgeons, designated a Level II by the state of New Jersey and a Level III Regional Perinatal Center.

Specialty areas include:

- Cardiology and Heart Surgery
- Adult and Pediatric Oncology
- Orthopedics
- Critical and Emergency Care
- Gynecology
- Geriatrics
- Gastroenterology and GI Surgery
- Pulmonology and Lung Surgery
- Urology
- Inpatient Rehabilitation
- Neonatal Intensive Care
- Neuroscience
- Maternity and Women's Health

== Affiliations and accreditations ==
Morristown Medical Center is the official hospital of the New York Jets football team. The Atlantic Health Jets Training Center in Florham Park, NJ, is the corporate headquarters for the team franchise. The campus includes a 120,000 square foot structure to house indoor training facilities and classrooms; and an 86,000 square foot field house where Jets players practice on a full-size, indoor, artificial-turf field.

Morristown Medical Center is mainly affiliated with the Sidney Kimmel School of Medicine at Thomas Jefferson University.

Morristown Medical Center is a Magnet Hospital for Excellence in Nursing Service, the highest level of recognition achievable from the American Nurses Credentialing Center for facilities that provide acute care services.

== Awards and Accolades ==
- Morristown Medical Center was rated the number one hospital in New Jersey by U.S. News & World Report from 2018 to 2022.
- U.S. News & World Report recognized Morristown Medical Center as a national leader in cardiology and heart surgery (#42), orthopedics (#30), gynecology (#28), geriatrics, gastroenterology and GI surgery, pulmonology and lung surgery, and urology in 2021.
- Morristown Medical Center is the only hospital in New Jersey named one of America's “50 Best Hospitals” for seven consecutive years by Healthgrades (as of 2022).
- Newsweek named Morristown Medical Center as one of the World's Best Hospitals (the 46th best hospital in the United States and number one in NJ), Best Hospital for Infection Prevention and one of the World's Best Smart Hospitals in 2022.
- Morristown Medical Center was included on Becker's Healthcare 2020 list of "100 Great Hospitals in America.”
- Leapfrog recognized Morristown Medical Center with an “A” hospital safety grade, its highest, thirteen consecutive times, and the Centers for Medicare and Medicaid Services award with its highest five-star rating in 2020.
- Morristown Medical Center named to Fortune and IBM Watson Health 100 Top Hospitals® list in 2021.
- Morristown Medical Center recognized as a “Leader in LGBTQ Healthcare Equality” since 2013 by the Human Rights Campaign (HRC) Foundation.
- In 2020, the hospital received 8 Women's Choice Awards ranked as top 2% in bariatrics, top 6% in patient safety, top 1% in obstetrics, top 1% in heart care, top 2% in cancer care, top 8% in breast care, top 4% in stroke care, and best patient experience.

== Goryeb Children's Hospital ==
Goryeb Children's Hospital

Organisation
- Type: Children's hospital

Services
- Beds: 65

History
- Founded: 2002

Links
- Website: Goryeb Children's

Goryeb Children's Hospital is a children's hospital located on the campus of Morristown Medical Center and provides pediatric care from infancy to age 21. The hospital has a wide range of pediatric specialties and subspecialties. In 2019, an expanded Pediatric Intensive Care Unit with 15 beds opened to increase the number of pediatric critical cases the hospital could handle.

The hospital also houses a 34-bed Level III Neonatal Intensive Care Unit dedicated to the care of newborns. The PICU and the NICU are directly attached to several Ronald McDonald House sleeping rooms for parents and siblings.

=== Services ===
Pediatric services offered at Goryeb Children's Hospital include:

- Adolescent Medicine
- Emergency Medicine
- General Pediatrics, Neonatology
- Allergies & Immunology
- Behavioral Health
- Brain Tumors
- Cardiology
- Craniofacial Services
- Critical Care
- Diabetes and Endocrinology
- Gastroenterology and Nutrition
- Genetics
- Hematology and Oncology
- Infectious Diseases
- Nephrology
- Neurology and Neurosurgery
- Orthopedics
- Palliative Care
- Physiatry
- Physical Rehabilitation
- Pulmonology
- Rheumatology
- Surgery
- Urology

=== Awards ===
In 2020, Goryeb Children's Hospital received two awards from the Women's Choice Awards hospital rankings; Best Children's Hospital and Best Pediatric Emergency Care.

== Notable deaths ==
The following list is arranged chronologically, based on date of death:

- Frederick T. van Beuren Jr. (1876–1943)
- Lyman Pierson Powell (1866–1946)
- Elias Bertram Mott (1879–1961)
- George Washington Jr. (1899–1966)
- Edward Francis Cavanagh Jr. (1906–1986)
- Anne Homer Doerflinger (1907–1995)
