= List of roller derby leagues =

This is a list of notable roller derby leagues, (Note: A Roller Derby "league" is synonymous with an individual club or team in other team sports, as opposed to the more typical use of the word league.) and may include those that are no longer in existence. Existence dates, where known, are included to provide a timeline charting the sport's growth cycles. The list may currently make distinctions according to each organization's professional/amateur business structure and active/defunct status, and is subdivided by gender (female or male-only, or co-ed) and age (adult versus junior). Within each subcategory, leagues are then listed according to region, by country and city. Countries with larger numbers of leagues, such as the United States and Canada, are further subdivided by state and province.

== Women's leagues ==
All are flat track unless otherwise indicated.

=== Argentina ===
- Buenos Aires – 2x4 Roller Derby

=== Australia ===
==== Australian Capital Territory ====
- Canberra – Canberra Roller Derby League

==== New South Wales ====
- Newcastle – Newcastle Roller Derby League
- Sydney – Sydney Roller Derby League

==== Queensland ====
- Brisbane – Northern Brisbane Rollers
- Brisbane – Sun State Roller Derby

==== South Australia ====
- Adelaide – Adelaide Roller Derby

==== Tasmania ====
- Hobart – Convict City Roller Derby League

==== Victoria ====
- Ballarat – Ballarat Roller Derby League
- Geelong – Geelong Roller Derby League
- Melbourne – South Sea Roller Derby
- Melbourne – Victorian Roller Derby League

==== Western Australia ====
- Perth – Perth Roller Derby
- Perth – Western Australia Roller Derby

=== Belgium ===
- Antwerp – Antwerp Roller Derby
- Ghent – Go-Go Gent Roller Derby

=== Brazil ===
- Rio de Janeiro - Avas Roller Derby
- São Paulo - Gray City Rebels

=== Canada ===
==== Alberta ====
- Calgary – Calgary Roller Derby
- Edmonton – E-Ville Roller Derby
- Edmonton – Oil City Roller Derby

==== British Columbia ====
- Vancouver – Terminal City Roller Derby
- Victoria – Eves of Destruction
- West Kootenays – West Kootenay Roller Derby

==== New Brunswick ====
- Moncton – Muddy River Rollers
- Saint John – Fog City Rollers

==== Nova Scotia ====
- Halifax – Anchor City Rollers

==== Ontario ====
- Alliston – Renegade Derby Dames
- Guelph – Royal City Roller Derby
- Hamilton – Hammer City Roller Derby
- Kitchener – Waterloo Area – Tri-City Roller Derby
- London – Forest City Roller Derby
- Ottawa – Ottawa Valley Roller Derby
- Toronto – Hogtown Roller Derby
- Toronto – Toronto Roller Derby
- Windsor– Windsor Roller Derby
- Woodstock– Woodstock Roller Derby

==== Quebec ====
- Montreal – Montreal Roller Derby

=== Colombia ===
- Bogotá – Rock and Roller Queens

=== Denmark ===
- Copenhagen – Copenhagen Roller Derby

=== Finland ===
- Helsinki – Helsinki Roller Derby
- Helsinki – Kallio Rolling Rainbow

=== France ===
- Bordeaux – Roller Derby Bordeaux
- Nantes – Nantes Roller Derby
- Paris – Paris Roller Derby
- Toulouse – Roller Derby Toulouse

=== Germany ===
- Berlin – Bear City Roller Derby
- Essen – Ruhrpott Roller Derby
- Hamburg – St. Pauli Roller Derby
- Kaiserslautern – Kaiserslautern Roller Derby
- Stuttgart – Stuttgart Valley Roller Derby

=== Ireland ===
- Cork – Cork City Firebirds
- Dublin – Dublin Roller Derby

=== Japan ===
- Tokyo – Tokyo Roller Girls
- Okinawa – Okinawa Roller Derby

=== Netherlands ===
- Amsterdam – Amsterdam Roller Derby

=== New Zealand ===
- Christchurch – Dead End Derby
- Hamilton – Hellmilton Roller Ghouls
- Palmerston North – Swamp City Roller Derby
- Wellington – Richter City Roller Derby
- Whangārei – Northland Roller Derby

=== Norway ===
- Trondheim – Nidaros Roller Derby

==== Spain ====
- Madrid - Roller Derby Madrid

=== Sweden ===
- Gothenburg – Gothenburg Roller Derby
- Malmö – Crime City Rollers
- Stockholm – Stockholm Roller Derby

=== United Kingdom ===
==== England ====
- Bath, Somerset – Bath Roller Derby
- Brighton, East Sussex – Brighton Rockers Roller Derby
- Calderdale, Kirklees - Halifax Bruising Banditas
- Leeds, West Yorkshire – Leeds Roller Derby
- Leicester, Leicestershire – Dolly Rockit Rollers
- Lincoln, Lincolnshire – Lincolnshire Bombers Roller Derby
- Liverpool, Merseyside – Liverpool Roller Birds
- London, Greater London – London Rockin' Rollers
- London, Greater London – London Roller Derby
- Middlesbrough, North Yorkshire – Middlesbrough Roller Derby
- Newcastle upon Tyne, Tyne and Wear – Newcastle Roller Derby
- Northampton, Northamptonshire – Vendetta Vixens
- Norwich, Norfolk – Norfolk Roller Derby
- Oldham, Greater Manchester – Rainy City Roller Derby
- Sheffield, South Yorkshire – Sheffield Steel Roller Derby

==== Northern Ireland ====
- Belfast – Belfast City Rockets
- Belfast – Belfast Roller Derby

==== Scotland ====
- Aberdeen – Granite City Roller Derby, Granite City Brawlers
- Dundee - Dundee Roller Derby
- Edinburgh – Auld Reekie Roller Derby, Demonburgh Junior Roller Derby
- Glasgow – Glasgow Roller Derby
- Glasgow - Mean City Roller Derby

==== Wales ====
- Cardiff – Cardiff Roller Collective
- Cardiff - Tiger Bay Brawlers
- Newport – Riot City Ravens

=== United States ===
==== Alabama ====
- Birmingham – Tragic City Rollers
- Huntsville – Rocket City Roller Derby

==== Alaska ====
- Anchorage – Rage City Roller Derby
- Fairbanks – Fairbanks Rollergirls
- Wasilla - Denali Destroyer Dolls

==== Arizona ====
- Phoenix – Arizona Derby Dames
- Phoenix – Arizona Roller Derby
- Tucson – Tucson Roller Derby 2003–present

==== California ====
- Bakersfield – Derby Revolution of Bakersfield
- Eureka – Humboldt Roller Derby
- Los Angeles – Angel City Derby
- Los Angeles – Los Angeles Derby Dolls
- Monterey - Monterey Bay Roller Derby
- Oakland – Bay Area Derby
- Orange County – Orange County Roller Derby
- Sacramento – Sacramento Roller Derby
- San Diego – San Diego Derby United
- San Luis Obispo – Central Coast Roller Derby
- Santa Cruz – Santa Cruz Roller Derby
- Ventura – Ventura County Derby Darlins

==== Colorado ====
- Boulder – Boulder County Bombers
- Castle Rock – Castle Rock 'n' Rollers
- Colorado Springs – Pikes Peak Derby Dames
- Denver – Denver Roller Derby
- Denver – Rocky Mountain Rollergirls
- Fort Collins – FoCo Roller Derby
- Greeley – Slaughterhouse Derby Girls
- Pueblo – SoCo Derby Dollz
- Salida - Ark Valley High Rollers

==== Connecticut ====
- Hartford – Hartford Area Roller Derby
- Waterbury – Connecticut Roller Derby

==== Delaware ====
- Wilmington – Diamond State Roller Derby

==== District of Columbia ====
- Washington, D.C. – DC Roller Derby

==== Florida ====
- Fort Lauderdale – Gold Coast Derby Grrls
- Fort Myers – Fort Myers Roller Derby
- Gainesville - Gainesville Roller Rebels
- Jacksonville – Jacksonville Roller Derby
- Pinellas Park – Deadly Rival Roller Derby
- Tallahassee – Tallahassee Rollergirls
- Tampa – Tampa Roller Derby

==== Georgia ====
- Athens – Classic City Rollergirls
- Atlanta – Atlanta Roller Derby
- Augusta – Soul City Sirens

==== Hawaii ====
- Hilo – Paradise Roller Girls
- Honolulu – Pacific Roller Derby

==== Idaho ====
- Boise – Treasure Valley Rollergirls

==== Illinois ====
- Champaign – Twin City Derby Girls
- Chicago – Windy City Rollers
- Marion – Southern Illinois Roller Girls
- Rockford – Rockford Rage

==== Indiana ====
- Bloomington – Bleeding Heartland Roller Derby
- Evansville – Demolition City Roller Derby
- Fort Wayne – Fort Wayne Derby Girls
- Indianapolis – Circle City Roller Derby
- Indianapolis – Naptown Roller Derby
- Lafayette – Lafayette Roller Derby
- Muncie - Cornfed Derby Dames

==== Iowa ====
- Cedar Rapids – Cedar Rapids RollerGirls
- Davenport - Quad City Rollers
- Des Moines – Mid Iowa Rollers
- Iowa City – Old Capitol City Roller Derby

==== Kansas ====
- Wichita – ICT Roller Derby

==== Kentucky ====
- Bowling Green – Vette City Roller Derby
- Covington – Black-n-Bluegrass RollerGirls
- Lexington – Roller Derby of Central Kentucky
- Louisville – Derby City Roller Girls

==== Louisiana ====
- Baton Rouge – Red Stick Roller Derby
- Houma – Cajun Rollergirls
- New Orleans – Big Easy Rollergirls

==== Maine ====
- Portland – Maine Roller Derby

==== Maryland ====
- Hagerstown – Mason-Dixon Roller Vixens
- Salisbury – Salisbury Roller Girls
- Waldorf – Southern Maryland Roller Derby

==== Massachusetts ====
- Boston – Boston Roller Derby
- Fitchburg/Leominster – Bay State Brawlers Roller Derby
- Northampton – Pioneer Valley Roller Derby

==== Michigan ====
- Ann Arbor – Ann Arbor Roller Derby
- Detroit – Detroit Roller Derby
- Flint – Flint Roller Derby
- Grand Rapids – Grand Raggidy Roller Derby
- Kalamazoo – Kalamazoo Roller Derby
- Lansing – Lansing Derby Vixens

==== Minnesota ====
- Bemidji – Babe City Rollers
- Duluth – Harbor City Roller Derby
- Minneapolis – North Star Roller Derby
- St. Paul – Minnesota Roller Derby

==== Mississippi ====
- Gautier, Mississippi - Mississippi Rollergirls

==== Missouri ====
- Columbia – CoMo Derby Dames
- Kansas City – Kansas City Roller Warriors
- Springfield – Springfield Roller Derby
- St. Charles – St. Chux Derby Chix
- St. Louis – Arch Rival Roller Derby

==== Nebraska ====
- Lincoln – No Coast Roller Derby
- Omaha – Omaha Roller Derby

==== Nevada ====
- Las Vegas – Fabulous Sin City Roller Derby

==== New Hampshire ====
- Manchester – New Hampshire Roller Derby

==== New Jersey ====
- Newark – Garden State Roller Derby
- Toms River – Jersey Shore Roller Derby

==== New Mexico ====
- Albuquerque – Duke City Roller Derby

==== New York ====
- Albany – Albany All Stars Roller Derby
- Buffalo – Queen City Roller Derby
- Hyde Park – Hudson Valley Horrors Roller Derby
- Ithaca – Ithaca Roller Derby
- Long Island – Long Island Roller Rebels
- New York – Gotham Roller Derby
- Rochester – Roc City Roller Derby
- Syracuse – Salt City Roller Derby
- Troy – Hellions of Troy
- Utica – Central New York Roller Derby
- Yonkers – Suburbia Roller Derby

==== North Carolina ====
- Asheville – Blue Ridge Rollergirls
- Charlotte – Charlotte Roller Derby
- Greensboro – Greensboro Roller Derby
- Raleigh – Carolina Roller Derby
- Wilmington – Cape Fear Roller Girls

==== North Dakota ====
- Fargo – Fargo Moorhead Derby Girls

==== Ohio ====
- Akron – Akron Roller Derby
- Cincinnati – Cincinnati Rollergirls
- Cleveland – Burning River Roller Derby
- Columbus – Ohio Roller Derby
- Dayton – Gem City Roller Derby
- Toledo – Glass City Rollers
- Youngstown - Youngstown Area Roller Derby

==== Oklahoma ====
- Oklahoma City – Twister City Roller Derby

==== Oregon ====
- Bend – Lava City Roller Dolls
- Corvallis – Sick Town Roller Derby
- Eugene – Emerald City Roller Derby
- Portland – Rose City Rollers
- Salem – Cherry City Roller Derby

==== Pennsylvania ====
- Allentown – Lehigh Valley Roller Derby
- Downingtown – Brandywine Roller Derby
- Hanover - Black Rose Rollers
- Harrisburg – Harrisburg Area Roller Derby
- Lancaster – Dutchland Derby Rollers
- Philadelphia – Penn Jersey Roller Derby
- Philadelphia – Philly Roller Derby
- Pittsburgh – Steel City Roller Derby

==== Rhode Island ====
- Providence – Providence Roller Derby

==== South Carolina ====
- Charleston – Lowcountry Highrollers
- Columbia – Columbia Quadsquad
- Greenville – Greenville Derby Dames

==== South Dakota ====
- Sioux Falls – Sioux Falls Roller Dollz

==== Tennessee ====
- Chattanooga - Chattanooga Roller Girls
- Johnson City - Little City Roller Girls
- Knoxville – Hard Knox Roller Girls
- Memphis – Memphis Roller Derby
- Nashville – Nashville Roller Derby

==== Texas ====
- Austin – Texas Rollergirls
- Austin – Texas Roller Derby
- Beaumont – Spindletop Roller Girls
- Dallas – Assassination City Roller Derby
- Dallas – Dallas Derby Devils
- Houston – Houston Roller Derby
- Lubbock – West Texas Roller Derby
- San Antonio – Alamo City Rollergirls
- Tyler – East Texas Bombers

==== Utah ====
- Ogden – Junction City Roller Dolls
- Salt Lake City – Salt City Derby Girls
- Salt Lake City – Wasatch Roller Derby

==== Vermont ====
- Burlington – Green Mountain Roller Derby

==== Virginia ====
- Charlottesville – Charlottesville Derby Dames
- Christiansburg - New River Valley Roller Girls
- Harrisonburg – Rocktown Rollers
- Richmond – River City Roller Derby
- Virginia Beach – Dominion Derby Girls

==== Washington ====
- Bellingham – Bellingham Roller Betties
- Centralia - Rainy City Roller Dolls
- Everett – Jet City Roller Derby
- Port Angeles - Port Scandalous Roller Derby
- Port Orchard – Slaughter County Roller Vixens
- Seattle – Rat City Roller Derby
- Seattle – Tilted Thunder Rail Birds
- Spokane – Lilac City Roller Derby
- Tacoma – Dockyard Derby Dames

==== Wisconsin ====
- Appleton – Fox Cities Roller Derby
- La Crosse - Mississippi Valley Mayhem
- Madison – Madison Roller Derby
- Milwaukee – Brewcity Bruisers
- Stevens Point – Mid-State Roller Derby

==== Wyoming ====
- Casper – A'Salt Creek Roller Girls
- Cheyenne – Cheyenne Roller Derby

== Open gender leagues ==
All are flat track unless otherwise indicated, and have separate men's and women's teams in addition to co-ed teams

=== Australia ===
==== Australian Capital Territory ====
- Canberra – Varsity Derby League

==== Queensland ====
- Brisbane – Brisbane City Rollers

==== New South Wales ====
- Wollongong/Illawarra – Wollongong Illawarra Roller Derby

=== Belgium ===
- Namur – Namur Roller Derby

=== France ===
- Toulouse – Roller Derby Toulouse

=== United Kingdom ===
==== England ====
- Bristol – Bristol Roller Derby
- Nottingham - Nottingham Roller Derby

=== United States ===
- Fort Wayne – Fort Wayne Roller Derby
- Northampton, Massachusetts – Pioneer Valley Roller Derby
- Philadelphia – Penn Jersey Roller Derby
- San Francisco – American Roller Skating Derby

== Men's leagues ==
These teams are not part of co-ed leagues.

=== United Kingdom ===
- Glasgow, Scotland - Glasgow Men's Roller Derby
- Greater London, England – Southern Discomfort Roller Derby
- Greater Manchester, England – Manchester Roller Derby

=== United States ===
==== Missouri ====
- St. Louis – St. Louis GateKeepers

==== New York ====
- New York City – New York Shock Exchange

==== Ohio ====
- Cleveland, Ohio - Cleveland Guardians Roller Derby

==== Oregon ====
- Portland, Oregon – Portland Men's Roller Derby

==== Washington ====
- Tacoma, Washington – Puget Sound Outcast Derby

==== Wisconsin ====
- Green Bay, Wisconsin – Green Bay Smackers
- Milwaukee – Wisconsin United Roller Derby

== Defunct amateur leagues ==
=== Australia ===
- Burleigh Heads, Queensland, Australia – Paradise City Roller Derby (2013-2017)

=== New Zealand ===
- Auckland – Auckland Roller Derby League (2011-2025) and Pirate City Rollers (2006-2025) merged to form Volcanic City Rollers

=== United Kingdom ===
- Birmingham - Birmingham Blitz Dames (2006-2021) merged with Central City Roller Derby (2007-2021) to form Birmingham Roller Derby
- Leeds, West Yorkshire - Hot Wheel Roller Derby (2010-2016) and Leeds Roller Dolls (2007-2016) merged to form Leeds Roller Derby
- Nottingham, Nottinghamshire – Nottingham Hellfire Harlots (2010-2023)
- Southend-on-Sea, Essex - Seaside Siren Roller Girls (2009-2018)
- Windsor, Berkshire – Royal Windsor Roller Derby (2007-2023)

=== United States ===
==== Arkansas ====
- Fayetteville, AR – NWA Roller Derby (2006-2019) and Benton County Roller Derby (2010-2019) merged to become Natural State Roller Derby

==== California ====
- Orange County, CA – Orange County Demolition Divas (2006–2007)
- San Jose, CA – Silicon Valley Roller Derby (2007-2024)

==== Colorado ====
- Fort Collins - Choice City Rebels (2009-2013)

==== Florida ====
- Lakeland – Lakeland Derby Dames (2010-2015)

==== Iowa ====
- Des Moines – Des Moines Derby Dames (2009-2015)
- Des Moines - Your Mom Men's Derby (2010-2020)
- Sioux City – Sioux City Roller Dames (2008-2016)

==== Illinois ====
- Bloomington - McLean County MissFits (2010-2015)
- Chicago – Chicago Outfit Roller Derby (2007-2022)

==== Maryland ====
- Baltimore – Charm City Roller Derby (2005-2023)
- Baltimore – Harm City Roller Derby (2007-2020)

==== Mississippi ====
- Hattiesburg, Mississippi - Hub City Derby Dames (2008-2015)
- Jackson - Magnolia Roller Vixens (2008-2016) merged into Capital City Roller Derby

==== Ohio ====
- Akron, OH - NEO Roller Derby (2007–2016) and Rubber City Rollergirls (2009–2016) merged to become Akron Roller Derby

==== Oklahoma ====
- Enid - Enid Roller Girls (2010-2019)
- Tulsa – Green Country Roller Girls (2006-2012)

==== Pennsylvania ====
- Dubois, PA - Northern Allegheny Roller Derby (2013-2023)
- Philadelphia – Old School Derby Association (2007-2013)

==== Texas ====
- Stephenville - Cowboy Capital Rollergirls (2011-2015)

==== Utah ====
- Layton, UT – Davis Derby Dames (2006–2009) – split to form the O-Town Derby Dames and the Junction City Roller Dolls

==== Washington ====
- Olympia – Oly Rollers (2006-2020)

== Defunct professional leagues ==
- Transcontinental Roller Derby (1935–1973; renamed to Roller Derby)
- National Skating Derby (Roller Games) (1961–1975; see also RollerGames and Roller Games International)
- RollerGames (1989–1990; TV only)
- Roller Game League (RGL) (1990–2001?)
- National Roller Derby League (NRDL) – 1995–2004; initially promoted as Roller Derby Inc.; current site promotes the San Francisco Bay Bombers, etc.
- American Roller Derby League (ARDL) – 1997–2003; Owned by Tim Patten; briefly promoted as American Inline Roller Skating Derby League; Promoted the Bay City Bombers
- World Skating League (WSL) / RollerJam (1998–2000; TV only)
