= Women's Flat Track Derby Association Division 3 =

International roller-derby division

The Women's Flat Track Derby Association Division 3 (WFTDA Division 3) was the third level of play in women's flat track roller derby, from 2013 through 2014.

== Organisation ==
Historically, the Women's Flat Track Derby Association (WFTDA) operated four regions, based on geographic location: East, North Central, South Central and West. At the start of 2013, these were replaced by three divisions, each operating worldwide. However, foreseeing continued growth in membership, the WFTDA stated that future developments were likely to include new regional structures alongside the divisional system.

Division 1 comprised the top 40-ranked member leagues, and Division 2 comprised those ranked 41–100; Division 3 consisted of member leagues who were ranked below 100. WFTDA rankings are set at the start of each year, based on performance over the previous year. Although rankings are updated during the year, teams would only transfer between divisions at the start of each year. Teams which graduated from the WFTDA Apprentice Program during the year were placed in Division 3. After the 2014 tournament season, the definition of the WFTDA competitive divisions changed, and Division 2 was contracted from 60 teams (places 41–100) to 20 (only those teams qualifying for the WFTDA Division 2 tournament, places 41–60). With this update, in-season division assignments no longer applied, and as such Division 3 is no longer active.

Although there was no end-of-year Division 3 Playoff, teams in Division 3 could qualify for one of the end-of-year Division 1 or Division 2 playoff tournaments if they were ranked in WFTDA's top sixty at the end of June each year.

== Member leagues ==
The initial Division 3 membership list was introduced ahead of the 2013 competitive season, comprising the teams that had been ranked at 26 and lower in each of the four previous geographic regions, plus teams that had yet to earn a rank. Teams were automatically added to Division 3 upon gaining membership. The final publication of Division 3 designation was in the October 2014 rankings release, and the below lists teams that were members at any time from the beginning of the designation, through October 2014.

League	City	Country	Year(s) of membership	Status as of 2017
Alamo City Rollergirls	San Antonio, TX	United States	2014	out of Playoffs
Ann Arbor Derby Dimes	Ann Arbor, MI	United States	2013, 2014	Division 1
Appalachian Rollergirls	Banner Elk, NC	United States	2014	out of Playoffs
Ark Valley High Rollers	Salida, CO	United States	2013, 2014	out of Playoffs
A'Salt Creek Roller Girls	Casper, WY	United States	2014	out of Playoffs
Assassination City Roller Derby	Plano, TX	United States	2014	out of Playoffs
Assault City Roller Derby	Syracuse, NY	United States	2013, 2014	out of Playoffs
Auld Reekie Roller Derby	Edinburgh	Scotland	2013	Division 2
Babe City Rollers	Bemidji, MN	United States	2014	out of Playoffs
Bakersfield Diamond Divas	Bakersfield, CA	United States	2014	out of Playoffs
Bay State Brawlers	Brighton, MA	United States	2014	out of Playoffs
Bear City Roller Derby	Berlin	Germany	2013, 2014	Division 2
Bellingham Roller Betties	Bellingham, WA	United States	2014	out of Playoffs
Black-n-Bluegrass RollerGirls	Covington, KY	United States	2013, 2014	out of Playoffs
Black Rose Rollers	Hanover, PA	United States	2013, 2014	out of Playoffs
Boulder County Bombers	Longmont, CO	United States	2013, 2014	out of Playoffs
Border City Brawlers	Windsor, ON	Canada	2013, 2014	out of Playoffs
Brandywine Roller Girls	Downingtown, PA	United States	2013	out of Playoffs
Canberra Roller Derby League	Canberra, ACT	Australia	2014	out of Playoffs
Cajun Rollergirls	Houma, LA	United States	2013, 2014	out of Playoffs
Calgary Roller Derby Association	Calgary, AB	Canada	2013, 2014	Division 1
Cape Fear Roller Girls	Wilmington, NC	United States	2014	out of Playoffs
Castle Rock 'n' Rollers	Castle Rock, CO	United States	2013	out of Playoffs
Cedar Rapids RollerGirls	Cedar Rapids, IA	United States	2013, 2014	out of Playoffs
Cedar Valley Derby Divas	Waterloo, IA	United States	2013, 2014	out of Playoffs
Cen-Tex Rollergirls	Temple, TX	United States	2013, 2014	out of Playoffs
Central City Rollergirls	Birmingham	England	2013, 2014	out of Playoffs
Central Coast Roller Derby	Paso Robles, CA	United States	2013, 2014	out of Playoffs
Central New York Roller Derby	Utica, NY	United States	2014	out of Playoffs
Charlotte Roller Girls	Charlotte, NC	United States	2013	out of Playoffs
Charlottesville Derby Dames	Charlottesville, VA	United States	2013, 2014	Division 1
Chattanooga Roller Girls	Chattanooga, TN	United States	2013, 2014	out of Playoffs
Chemical Valley Rollergirls	Charleston, WV	United States	2014	out of Playoffs
Cherry City Derby Girls	Salem, OR	United States	2013, 2014	out of Playoffs
Cheyenne Capidolls	Cheyenne, WY	United States	2013, 2014	out of Playoffs
Chippewa Valley Roller Girls	Eau Claire, WI	United States	2014	out of Playoffs
Choice City Rebels	Fort Collins, CO	United States	2013	disbanded (Note: Choice City appears to have gone dormant after 2012, and while placed in D3 for 2013 did not bout that year)
Circle City Derby Girls	Indianapolis, IN	United States	2013, 2014	out of Playoffs
Classic City Rollergirls	Athens, GA	United States	2013, 2014	out of Playoffs
CoMo Derby Dames	Columbia, MO	United States	2013, 2014	out of Playoffs
Confluence Crush Roller Derby	St. Louis, MO	United States	2013, 2014	out of Playoffs
Copenhagen Roller Derby	Copenhagen	Denmark	2013, 2014	out of Playoffs
Cornfed Derby Dames	Muncie, IN	United States	2013, 2014	out of Playoffs
Cowboy Capital Rollergirls	Stephenville, TX	United States	2013, 2014	disbanded (Note: Cowboy Capital last played and was last ranked by the WFTDA in March 2015)
Crime City Rollers	Malmö	Sweden	2013, 2014	Division 1
Crossroads City Derby	Las Cruces, NM	United States	2014	out of Playoffs
Denali Destroyer Dolls	Wasilla, AK	United States	2013	left WFTDA (Note: Denali left the WFTDA at some point, having never gained a ranking. League is still active as a non-member organization)
Derby City Rollergirls	Louisville, KY	United States	2013, 2014	out of Playoffs
Derby Revolution of Bakersfield	Bakersfield, CA	United States	2013, 2014	out of Playoffs
Devil Dog Derby Dames	Okinawa	Japan	2014	out of Playoffs
Diamond State Roller Girls	Wilmington, DE	United States	2013, 2014	out of Playoffs
Dixie Derby Girls	Huntsville, AL	United States	2013, 2014	out of Playoffs
Dockyard Derby Dames	Tacoma, WA	United States	2013, 2014	out of Playoffs
Dolly Rockit Rollers	Leicestershire	England	2014	out of Playoffs
Dominion Derby Girls	Virginia Beach, VA	United States	2014	out of Playoffs
Dupage Derby Dames	Chicago, IL	United States	2014	out of Playoffs
Durango Roller Girls	Durango, CO	United States	2014	out of Playoffs
El Paso Roller Derby	El Paso, TX	United States	2014	out of Playoffs
Enid Roller Girls	Enid, OK	United States	2013, 2014	out of Playoffs
Fairbanks Rollergirls	Fairbanks, Alaska	United States	2013	out of Playoffs
FoCo Girls Gone Derby	Fort Collins, CO	United States	2013, 2014	out of Playoffs
Forest City Derby Girls	London, ON	Canada	2013, 2014	out of Playoffs
Fort Myers Derby Girls	Fort Myers, FL	United States	2013	out of Playoffs
Fort Wayne Derby Girls	Fort Wayne, IN	United States	2014	out of Playoffs
Fox Cityz Foxz	Appleton, WI	United States	2013, 2014	merged (Note: Fox City Foxz merged with Paper Valley Rollergirls in late 2015, and the merged organization rebranded as Fox Cities Roller Derby)
Gainesville Roller Rebels	Gainesville, FL	United States	2013	out of Playoffs
Garden State Rollergirls	Newark, NJ	United States	2013	out of Playoffs
Gem City Rollergirls	Dayton, OH	United States	2013, 2014	out of Playoffs
Go-Go Gent Roller Derby	Ghent	Belgium	2013, 2014	out of Playoffs
Glasgow Roller Derby	Glasgow	Scotland	2013	out of Playoffs
Glass City Rollers	Toledo, OH	United States	2013, 2014	out of Playoffs
Granite State Roller Derby	Concord, NH	United States	2013, 2014	out of Playoffs
Greater Toronto Area Rollergirls	Toronto, ON	Canada	2013, 2014	out of Playoffs
Greensboro Roller Derby	Greensboro, NC	United States	2013, 2014	out of Playoffs
Greenville Derby Dames	Greenville, SC	United States	2013, 2014	out of Playoffs
Hammer City Roller Girls	Hamilton, ON	Canada	2013	out of Playoffs
Happy Valley Derby Darlins	Utah County, UT	United States	2013, 2014	out of Playoffs
Harbor City Roller Dames	Duluth, MN	United States	2013, 2014	out of Playoffs
Hard Knox Roller Girls	Knoxville, TN	United States	2014	out of Playoffs
Harrisburg Area Roller Derby	Harrisburg, PA	United States	2013	out of Playoffs
Hartford Area Roller Derby	Manchester, CT	United States	2013	out of Playoffs
Hellfire Harlots	Nottingham	England	2013	out of Playoffs
Hellions of Troy Roller Derby	Troy, NY	United States	2013, 2014	out of Playoffs
Helsinki Roller Derby	Helsinki	Finland	2013, 2014	Division 1
Hub City Derby Dames	Hattiesburg, MS	United States	2013, 2014	left WFTDA (Note: Hub City Derby Dames was last ranked by the WFTDA in March 2015, and no longer is listed as a member organization)
Hudson Valley Horrors Roller Derby	Kingston, NY	United States	2013, 2014	out of Playoffs
ICT Roller Girls	Wichita, KS	United States	2013, 2014	out of Playoffs
Jersey Shore Roller Girls	Toms River, NJ	United States	2013, 2014	out of Playoffs
Juneau Rollergirls	Juneau, AK	United States	2014	out of Playoffs
Junction City Roller Dolls	Ogden, UT	United States	2013, 2014	out of Playoffs
Kallio Rolling Rainbow	Helsinki	Finland	2014	Division 1
Kokeshi Roller Dolls	Okinawa	Japan	2013, 2014	out of Playoffs
Lafayette Brawlin' Dolls	Lafayette, IN	United States	2013, 2014	out of Playoffs
Lansing Derby Vixens	Lansing, MI	United States	2013, 2014	out of Playoffs
Lava City Roller Dolls	Bend, OR	United States	2013, 2014	out of Playoffs
Leeds Roller Derby	Leeds	England	2013, 2014	out of Playoffs (Note: Leeds Roller Dolls merged with Hot Wheel Roller Derby in December 2016, and the merged organization rebranded as Leeds Roller Derby)
Lehigh Valley Rollergirls	Allentown, PA	United States	2013, 2014	out of Playoffs
Lilac City Roller Girls	Spokane, WA	United States	2013	out of Playoffs
Lincolnshire Bombers Roller Derby	Lincoln	England	2013	out of Playoffs
Little City Roller Girls	Johnson City, TN	United States	2013, 2014	out of Playoffs
Little Steel Derby Girls	Youngstown, OH	United States	2013, 2014	out of Playoffs
London Rockin' Rollers	London	England	2013, 2014	out of Playoffs
Lowcountry Highrollers	Charleston, SC	United States	2013	out of Playoffs
Magnolia Roller Vixens	Jackson, MS	United States	2013, 2014	merged (Note: Magnolia Roller Vixens merged into non-WFTDA league Capital City Roller Girls in 2016, and the merged organization continues as Capital City, without WFTDA status)
Mason-Dixon Roller Vixens	Hagerstown, MD	United States	2013, 2014	out of Playoffs
Mass Attack Roller Derby	Taunton, MA	United States	2014	out of Playoffs
McLean County MissFits	Bloomington, IL	United States	2013, 2014	left WFTDA (Note: McLean County Missfits was last ranked in 2015, and is no longer listed as a member, and appears to be inactive as of December 2017)
Mid-State Sisters of Skate	Stevens Point, WI	United States	2013, 2014	out of Playoffs
Middlesbrough Roller Derby	Teesside	England	2014	Division 2
Mississippi Rollergirls	Gautier, MS	United States	2013, 2014	out of Playoffs
Mississippi Valley Mayhem	La Crosse, WI	United States	2013, 2014	out of Playoffs
Mo-Kan Roller Girls	Joplin, MO	United States	2014	out of Playoffs
Monterey Bay Derby Dames	Monterey, CA	United States	2013, 2014	out of Playoffs
Mother State Roller Derby	Richmond, VA	United States	2013, 2014	out of Playoffs
Muddy River Rollers	Moncton, NB	Canada	2014	out of Playoffs
Nantes Roller Derby	Nantes	France	2014	out of Playoffs
New Jersey Roller Derby	Morristown, NJ	United States	2014	out of Playoffs
New River Valley Roller Girls	Christiansburg, VA	United States	2013, 2014	out of Playoffs
Newcastle Roller Derby	Newcastle	England	2014	out of Playoffs
Nidaros Roller Derby	Trondheim	Norway	2013, 2014	out of Playoffs
North Texas Derby Revolution	Justin, TX	United States	2014	out of Playoffs
One Love Roller Dolls	Antwerp	Belgium	2014	out of Playoffs
Oklahoma City Roller Derby	Oklahoma City, OK	United States	2013	merged (Note: Oklahoma City Roller Derby merged into Oklahoma Victory Dolls in early 2017, and the merged organization continues under the latter's name)
Oslo Roller Derby	Oslo	Norway	2013, 2014	out of Playoffs
Pacific Roller Derby	Honolulu, HI	United States	2013, 2014	out of Playoffs
Paradise City Roller Derby	Burleigh, QLD	Australia	2014	out of Playoffs
Paradise Roller Girls	Hilo, HI	United States	2013	out of Playoffs
Paris Roller Derby	Paris	France	2013, 2014	Division 2
Pirate City Rollers	Auckland	New Zealand	2013	Division 2
Port City Roller Derby	Oswego, NY	United States	2014	out of Playoffs
Port Scandalous Roller Derby	Port Angeles, WA	United States	2013, 2014	out of Playoffs
Pueblo Derby Devil Dollz	Pueblo, CO	United States	2013, 2014	out of Playoffs
Quad City Rollers	Bettendorf, IA	United States	2013, 2014	out of Playoffs
Rage City Rollergirls	Anchorage, AK	United States	2014	out of Playoffs
Rainier Rollergirls	Tacoma, WA	United States	2014	out of Playoffs
Rainy City Roller Dolls	Centralia, WA	United States	2013, 2014	out of Playoffs
Rainy City Roller Derby	Manchester	England	2013, 2014	Division 1
Red Stick Roller Derby	Baton Rouge, LA	United States	2013, 2014	out of Playoffs
Renegade Derby Dames	Alliston, ON	Canada	2014	out of Playoffs
Richland County Regulators	Columbia, SC	United States	2013, 2014	out of Playoffs
Richter City Roller Derby	Wellington	New Zealand	2013	out of Playoffs
Rideau Valley Roller Girls	Ottawa, ON	Canada	2013	out of Playoffs (Note: Rideau Valley merged with Capital City Derby Dolls in 2018, and the merged organization continues as Ottawa Valley Roller Derby)
Rock and Roller Queens	Bogotá	Colombia	2013, 2014	out of Playoffs
Rock Coast Rollers	Rockland, ME	United States	2014	out of Playoffs
Rockford Rage	Rockford, IL	United States	2013	out of Playoffs
Rockin City Rollergirls	Round Rock, TX	United States	2014	out of Playoffs
Rocktown Rollers	Harrisonburg, VA	United States	2013, 2014	out of Playoffs
Rodeo City Rollergirls	Ellensburg, WA	United States	2013	out of Playoffs
Roller Girls of the Apocalypse	Kaiserslautern	Germany	2014	out of Playoffs
Rollergirls of Central Kentucky	Lexington, KY	United States	2013	out of Playoffs
Roughneck Roller Derby	Tulsa, OK	United States	2014	out of Playoffs
Royal Windsor Roller Derby	Windsor	England	2013, 2014	out of Playoffs
Ruhrpott Roller Girls	Essen	Germany	2014	out of Playoffs
Sac City Rollers	Sacramento, CA	United States	2013	Division 2 (Note: Sac City merged with Sacred City Derby Girls in late 2017, and rebranded in January 2018 as Sacramento Roller Derby)
Salisbury Rollergirls	Salisbury, MD	United States	2013, 2014	out of Playoffs
San Fernando Valley Roller Derby	Van Nuys, CA	United States	2013, 2014	out of Playoffs
Savannah Derby Devils	Savannah, GA	United States	2014	out of Playoffs
Shasta Roller Derby	Redding, CA	United States	2014	out of Playoffs
Sheffield Steel Roller Derby	Sheffield	England	2013	out of Playoffs
Shore Points Roller Derby	Williamstown, NJ	United States	2014	out of Playoffs
Sick Town Derby Dames	Corvallis, OR	United States	2013, 2014	out of Playoffs
Sioux Falls Roller Dollz	Sioux Falls, SD	United States	2014	out of Playoffs
Slaughterhouse Derby Girls	Greeley, CO	United States	2013, 2014	out of Playoffs
Snake Pit Derby Dames	Coeur d'Alene, ID	United States	2014	out of Playoffs
SoCal Derby	San Diego, CA	United States	2013, 2014	out of Playoffs
Soul City Sirens	Augusta, GA	United States	2013, 2014	out of Playoffs
South Bend Roller Girls	South Bend, IN	United States	2013, 2014	out of Playoffs
South Sea Roller Derby	Melbourne, VIC	Australia	2014	out of Playoffs
Southern Illinois Roller Girls	Marion, IL	United States	2013, 2014	out of Playoffs
Southern Oregon Rollergirls	Medford, OR	United States	2013	out of Playoffs
Spindletop Roller Girls	Beaumont, TX	United States	2013, 2014	out of Playoffs
Springfield Roller Girls	Springfield, MO	United States	2014	out of Playoffs
St. Chux Derby Chix	Saint Charles, MO	United States	2013	out of Playoffs
Stockholm Roller Derby	Stockholm	Sweden	2013, 2014	Division 1
Stuttgart Valley Roller Derby	Stuttgart	Germany	2013, 2014	out of Playoffs
Sun State Roller Girls	Brisbane	Australia	2013	Division 2
Team United Women's Roller Derby	Des Moines, IA	United States	2014	out of Playoffs
Tiger Bay Brawlers	Cardiff	Wales	2013, 2014	out of Playoffs
Tokyo Roller Girls	Tokyo	Japan	2013, 2014	out of Playoffs
Tragic City Rollers	Birmingham, AL	United States	2013, 2014	out of Playoffs
Twin City Derby Girls	Champaign, IL	United States	2013	out of Playoffs
Ventura County Derby Darlins	Camarillo, CA	United States	2013, 2014	out of Playoffs
Vette City Roller Derby	Bowling Green, KY	United States	2013, 2014	out of Playoffs
West Coast Derby Knockouts	Ventura, CA	United States	2013, 2014	out of Playoffs
West Texas Roller Dollz	Lubbock, TX	United States	2013, 2014	out of Playoffs
Worcester Roller Derby	Worcester, MA	United States	2014	left WFTDA (Note: Worcester is no longer is listed as a member organization by the WFTDA)
