= West Region (WFTDA) =

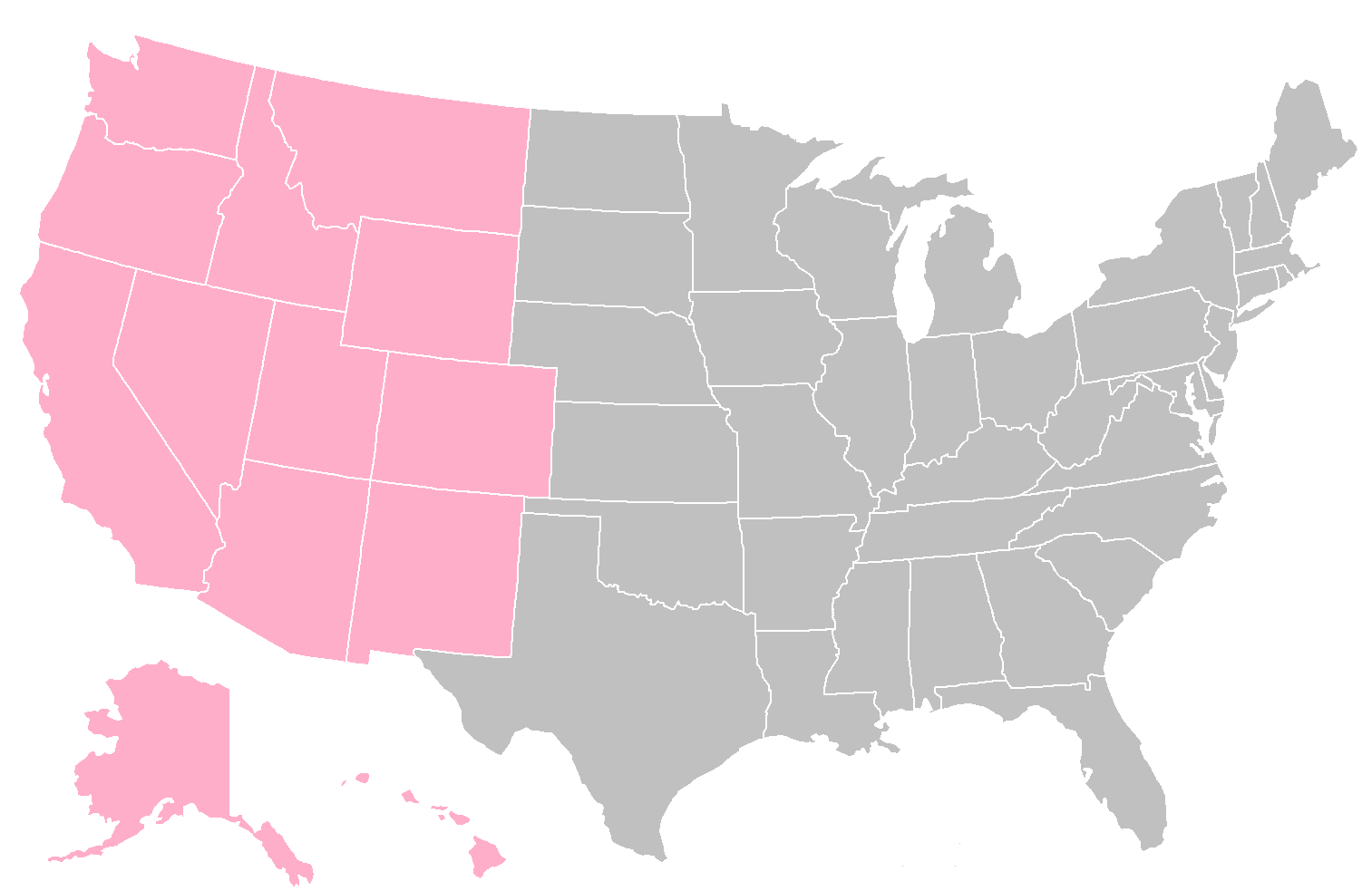
WFTDA West Region

The Women's Flat Track Derby Association's (WFTDA) West Region was formed in 2006. In 2009, teams from the eastern part of the region were moved into the North Central and South Central Regions.

In 2008, the WFTDA changed from having just two regional tournaments (East and West), to five, made up of teams from four regions: East, North Central, South Central and West.

For 2011, the region was reduced in size, with teams in New Mexico moving to the South Central Region.

The WFTDA has now moved away from the Big 5 WFTDA Championships qualification tournament structure, which was last competed in 2012. Starting with the 2013 WFTDA season, the regions were discontinued in favour of an overall rankings-based system, and a new playoff format was created.

== Member leagues ==
League	Metro area	Country	Admitted	Notes
Angel City Derby Girls	Los Angeles, CA	United States	14 June 2007	
Arizona Roller Derby	Phoenix, AZ	United States	2006	
Ark Valley High Rollers	Salida, CO	United States	1 December 2011	
B.ay A.rea D.erby Girls	Oakland, CA	United States	2006	
Bellingham Roller Betties	Bellingham, WA	United States	2009	
Castle Rock 'n' Rollers	Castle Rock, CO	United States	1 June 2011	
Central Coast Roller Derby	Paso Robles, CA	United States	2008	
Cherry City Derby Girls	Salem, OR	United States	3 December 2012	
Cheyenne Capidolls	Cheyenne, WY	United States	7 September 2012	
Choice City Rebels	Fort Collins, CO	United States	1 March 2011	
Denver Roller Dolls	Denver, CO	United States	18 September 2007	
Derby Revolution of Bakersfield	Bakersfield, CA	United States	1 December 2010	
Dockyard Derby Dames	Tacoma, WA	United States	1 December 2010	
Emerald City Roller Girls	Eugene, OR	United States		
Fabulous Sin City Rollergirls	Las Vegas, Nevada	United States	2006	
Fairbanks Rollergirls	Fairbanks, Alaska	United States	1 June 2011	
FoCo Girls Gone Derby	Fort Collins, CO	United States	7 January 2009	
Humboldt Roller Derby	Eureka, CA	United States	10 January 2012	
Jet City Rollergirls	Everett, WA	United States	2009	
Junction City Rollergirls	Ogden, UT	United States	1 March 2011	
Lava City Roller Dolls	Bend, OR	United States	2008	
Lilac City Rollergirls	Spokane, WA	United States	1 March 2012	
Oly Rollers	Olympia, WA	United States	10 April 2008	
Pacific Roller Derby	Honolulu, HI	United States	2009	
Pikes Peak Derby Dames	Colorado Springs, CO	United States	2006	
Pueblo Derby Devil Dollz	Pueblo, CO	United States	1 September 2010	
Rage City Rollergirls	Anchorage, AK	United States	1 March 2011	
Rainy City Roller Dolls	Centralia, WA	United States	3 December 2012	
Rat City Rollergirls	Seattle, WA	United States	2006	
Rocky Mountain Rollergirls	Denver, CO	United States	2006	
Rose City Rollers	Portland, OR	United States	2006	
Sac City Rollers	Sacramento, CA	United States	1 June 2012	
Sacred City Derby Girls	Sacramento, CA	United States	7 October 2007	
Santa Cruz Derby Girls	Santa Cruz, CA	United States	1 September 2010	
Sick Town Derby Dames	Corvallis, OR	United States	1 June 2012	
Silicon Valley Roller Girls	San Jose, CA	United States	17 June 2010	
Slaughter County Roller Vixens	Port Orchard, WA	United States	16 September 2008	
Slaughterhouse Derby Girls	Greeley, CO	United States	2009	
SoCal Derby	San Diego, CA	United States	3 December 2012	
Sonoma County Roller Derby	Santa Rosa, CA	United States	1 December 2010	
Terminal City Rollergirls	Vancouver, BC	Canada	1 March 2011	
Treasure Valley Rollergirls	Boise, ID	United States	1 September 2011	
Tucson Roller Derby	Tucson, AZ	United States	2006	
Victorian Roller Derby League	Melbourne	Australia	1 December 2011	
Wasatch Roller Derby	Salt Lake City, UT	United States	17 June 2010	

== Former members ==
League	Metro area	Country	Admitted	Left	Notes
Alamo City Rollergirls	San Antonio, TX	United States	2006	1 January 2009	Transferred to South Central Region
Assassination City Roller Derby	Dallas, TX	United States	2006	1 January 2009	Transferred to South Central Region
Dallas Derby Devils	Dallas, TX	United States	2006	1 January 2009	Transferred to South Central Region
Duke City Derby	Albuquerque, NM	United States	2006	1 January 2011	Transferred to South Central Region
East Texas Bombers	Tyler, TX	United States	2006	1 January 2009	Transferred to South Central Region
Green Country Roller Girls	Tulsa, OK	United States	25 September 2007	1 January 2009	Transferred to South Central Region
Houston Roller Derby	Houston, TX	United States	2006	1 January 2009	Transferred to South Central Region
Kansas City Roller Warriors	Kansas City, MO	United States	2006	1 January 2009	Transferred to South Central Region
No Coast Derby Girls	Lincoln, NE	United States	3 March 2007	1 January 2009	Transferred to South Central Region
Northwest Arkansas Rollergirls	Fayetteville, AR	United States	25 May 2007	1 January 2009	Transferred to South Central Region
Oklahoma Victory Dolls	Oklahoma City, OK	United States	2008	1 January 2009	Transferred to South Central Region
Orange County Roller Girls	Huntington Beach, CA	United States	January 2008	March 2009	
Salt City Derby Girls	Salt Lake City, UT	United States	20 December 2007	March 2011	
Sioux Falls Roller Dollz	Sioux Falls, SD	United States		1 January 2009	Transferred to North Central Region
Texas Rollergirls	Austin, TX	United States	2006	1 January 2009	Transferred to South Central Region
West Texas Roller Dollz	Lubbock, TX	United States	25 August 2008	1 January 2009	Transferred to South Central Region

== Rankings ==
Current Official WFTDA Regional Rankings as of January 29, 2013

Region	West
1	Oly Rollers
2	Denver Roller Dolls
3	Bay Area Derby Girls
4	Rose City Rollers
5	Rat City Roller Girls
6	Rocky Mountain Rollergirls
7	Sacred City Derby Girls
8	Angel City Derby Girls
9	Wasatch Roller Derby
10	Jet City Rollergirls
11	Victorian Roller Derby League
12	Terminal City Rollergirls
13	Arizona Roller Derby
14	Pikes Peak Derby Dames
15	Fabulous Sin City Rollergirls
16	Santa Cruz Derby Girls
17	Tucson Roller Derby
18	Sac City Rollers
19	Silicon Valley Roller Girls
20	Emerald City Roller Girls
21	Treasure Valley Rollergirls
22	Slaughter County Roller Vixens
23	Humboldt Roller Derby
24	Bellingham Roller Betties
25	Sonoma County Roller Derby
26	Rage City Rollergirls
27	Central Coast Roller Derby
28	Slaughterhouse Derby Girls
29	FoCo Girls Gone Derby
30	Choice City Rebels
31	Junction City Roller Dolls
32	Ark Valley High Rollers
33	Lava City Roller Dolls
34	Pueblo Derby Devil Dollz
35	Dockyard Derby Dames
36	Pacific Roller Derby
37	Fairbanks Rollergirls
38	Castle Rock 'n' Rollers

Member teams unranked at this time:

- Cherry City Derby Girls
- Cheyenne Capidolls
- Derby Revolution of Bakersfield
- Lilac City Rollergirls
- Rainy City Roller Dolls
- Sick Town Derby Dames
- SoCal Derby

== Region Champions ==
- 2007 - Rat City Rollergirls
- 2008 - Texas Rollergirls
- 2009 - Oly Rollers
- 2010 - Rocky Mountain Rollergirls
- 2011 - Oly Rollers
- 2012 - Oly Rollers

== Hydra Trophy winners produced ==
- 2009 - Oly Rollers
- 2010 - Rocky Mountain Rollergirls

== West Region titles won by league ==
League	Number of Championships Won	Last Year Won
Oly Rollers	2	2011
Rocky Mountain Rollergirls	1	2010
Texas Rollergirls	1	2008
Rat City Rollergirls	1	2007

== See also ==
- East Region
- North Central Region
- South Central Region
