= Sonoma County Roller Derby =

Roller derby league

- Metro area: Santa Rosa, California
- Country: United States
- Founded: 2007
- Teams: All-Stars (A team); Growlers(mixed level travel team); Wine Country Wreckers (home team); North Bay Bruisers (home team)
- Track type(s): Flat
- Venue: Grace Pavilion, Sonoma County Fairgrounds
- Affiliations: WFTDA
- Website: www.sonomacountyrollerderby.org

Sonoma County Roller Derby is a women's flat track roller derby league based in Santa Rosa, California. The league (SCRD) has around 70 active members who not only skate in bouts, but participate in community building events throughout the county. Sonoma County Roller Derby is a member of the Women's Flat Track Derby Association (WFTDA). The All-Stars are SCRD's WFTDA level travel team; the All-Stars skate against other A level teams for international rankings. The league also has a mixed level travel team, the Growlers, and two home teams: the Wine Country Wreckers and North Bay Bruisers.

== History ==
The league was founded in 2007 and was accepted into the Women's Flat Track Derby Association Apprentice Program in October 2009, becoming a full member of the WFTDA in December 2010.

In February 2011, some former league skaters formed the Resurrection Roller Girls. Following this, Sonoma County left its California skate venue, which it had regularly been selling out, and redeveloped a former furniture store in downtown Santa Rosa as a new roller rink. This project ran into difficulties after city regulations required the installation of an expensive sprinkler system, and league practices there ceased in 2014.

Sonoma County Roller Derby now hosts home bouts in the Grace Pavilion of the Sonoma County Fairgrounds.

== WFTDA rankings ==
Season	Final ranking	Playoffs	Championship
2011	28 W	DNQ	DNQ
2012	25 W	DNQ	DNQ
2013	143 WFTDA	DNQ	DNQ
2014	131 WFTDA	DNQ	DNQ
2015	198 WFTDA	DNQ	DNQ
2016	133 WFTDA	DNQ	DNQ
2017	219 WFTDA	DNQ	DNQ
2018	167 WFTDA	DNQ	DNQ
2019	208 WFTDA	DNQ	DNQ
