= PSRD =

PSRD may stand for:

- Pakistan Society for the Rehabilitation of the Disabled, non-profit, charitable organization based in lahore, Pakistan
- Port Scandalous Roller Derby, sports league based in Port Angeles, Washington
- Press Scrutiny and Registration Division, Burmese censorship organisation
