= SCDG =

SCDG may refer to:

- Sacred City Derby Girls, from Sacramento, California
- Salt City Derby Girls, from Salt Lake City, Utah
