= High roller (disambiguation) =

A high roller is a gambler who wagers large amounts of money.

High Roller or Highroller may also refer to:

== Amusement rides ==
- High Roller (Ferris wheel), on the Las Vegas Strip, Nevada, US
- High Roller (Stratosphere), a steel roller coaster atop Stratosphere Tower, Las Vegas, Nevada, US, from 1996 to 2005
- High Roller (Valleyfair), a wooden roller coaster at Shakopee, Minnesota, US, built in 1976

== Film and television ==
- High Roller: The Stu Ungar Story, a 2003 American biopic
- The Con Artists (1976 film), also known as High Rollers, a 1976 crime-comedy film
- High Rollers, an American TV game show based on the dice game Shut the Box
- High Rollers (film), an American action film
- Highroller, a fictional character in the German comedy-drama TV series Jabhook

== Games ==
- Crazy Taxi 3: High Roller, a 2002 Sega electronic video game
- Harrier Combat Simulator, a 1987 video game also known as High Roller

== Music ==
- High Roller (album), by James Montgomery. 1974
- "High Roller" (song), by Cheap Trick, 1978
- "High Rollers" (song) by Ice-T, 1988
- "High Roller", a song by The Crystal Method from the 1997 album Vegas
- "High Roller", a song by Pegboard Nerds from the 2013 EP Guilty Pleasures

== Roller derby leagues ==
- Ark Valley High Rollers, based in Salida, Colorado, US
- Lowcountry Highrollers, based in Charleston, South Carolina, US

== Others ==
- Operation High Roller, bank fraud cyberattack

== See also ==
- Jody Highroller, an alias of American rapper Riff Raff
