= Hattiesburg (disambiguation) =

Hattiesburg is a city in Mississippi. "Hattiesburg" may also refer to:

- Hattiesburg metropolitan area
- Hattiesburg–Laurel Regional Airport
- Hattiesburg Bobby L. Chain Municipal Airport
- Hattiesburg Public School District
- Hattiesburg Zoo
- Hattiesburg station
- Hattiesburg American
- Hub City Derby Dames, formerly "Hattiesburg Southern Misfits."
