= SVRD =

SVRD may refer to:

- Silicon Valley Roller Derby, a defunct American roller derby league
- Stuttgart Valley Roller Derby, a German women's flat track roller derby league
- SVRD, the Namma Metro station code for Swami Vivekananda Road metro station, Bengaluru, Karnataka, India
