= Pacific Roller Derby =

Roller derby league

- Metro area: Honolulu, HI
- Country: United States
- Founded: 2008
- Teams: Hulagans (A team)
- Track type(s): Flat
- Venue: Palama Settlement Gymnasium; Kamiloiki Community Park
- Affiliations: WFTDA
- Website: www.pacificrollerderby.com

Pacific Roller Derby (PRD) is a women's flat track roller derby league based in Honolulu, Hawaii. Founded in 2008, the league consists of a single team that plays teams from other leagues. Pacific is a member of the Women's Flat Track Derby Association (WFTDA).

== History ==
According to their mission statement, Pacific Roller Derby, LLC (PRD) is an O‘ahu business and amateur sports organization dedicated to playing and promoting the sport of women's flat track roller derby. Members of PRD include a diverse group of women and men serving as players, referees and support staff. PRD is a member of the Women's Flat Track Derby Association and is devoted primarily to safe and healthy training for local, national and international competition. PRD strives to promote the values of sportswomanship, positive community involvement and the aloha spirit.

The league was founded in 2008, and joined the Women's Flat Track Derby Association (WFTDA) the following year. Since then the league has played regularly against teams from the mainland U.S., in addition to organizing the annual SK808 Tournament for locally based leagues and skaters. As of 2014 the league consisted of three home teams: the Leahi Diamond Dolls, South Shore Sirens, and Tropic Thunder. Skaters were drawn from these home teams to compete in the WFTDA-chartered All-Star team The Hulagans or on The Bizznass travel B-team against other leagues.

In 2013, members of the league appeared in an episode of Hawaii Five-0, in which the girlfriend of character Steve McGarrett joins a roller derby league to search for a suspect its among members.

== WFTDA rankings ==
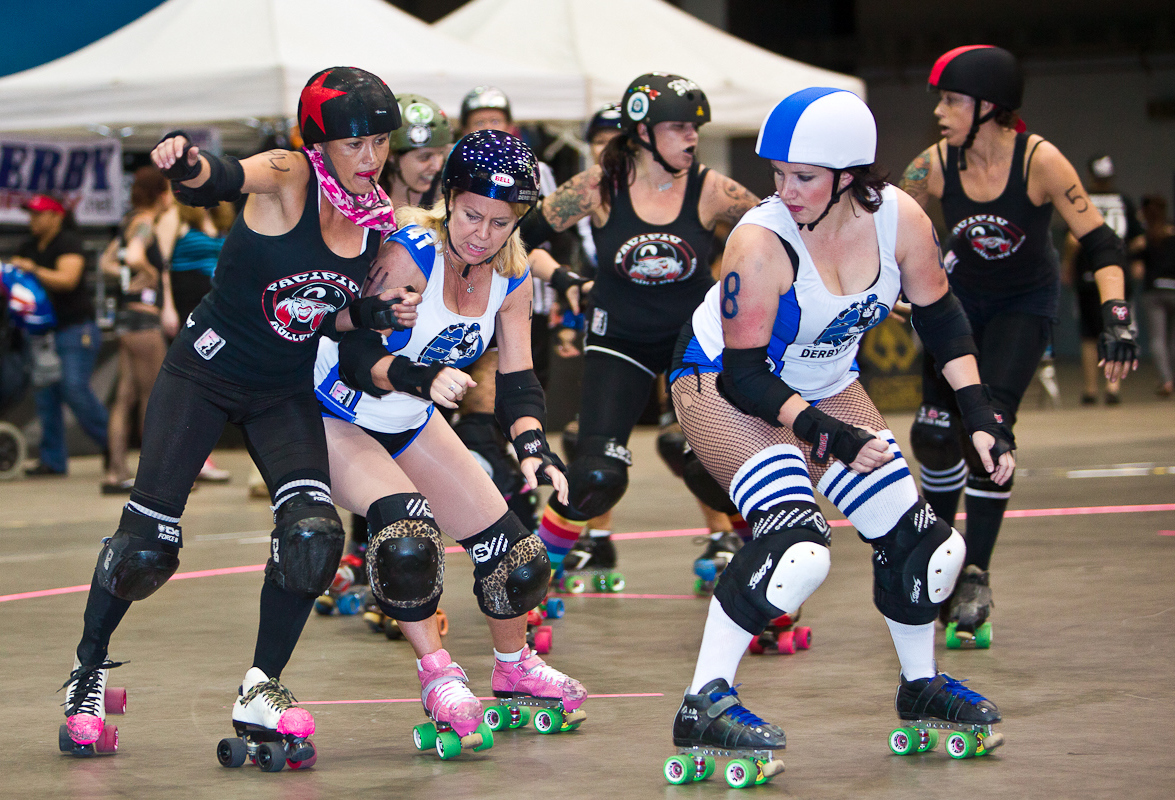
Pacific Roller Derby (in black) take on FoCo Girls Gone Derby at the 2011 Dust Devil tournament

| Season | Final ranking | Playoffs | Championship |
|---|---|---|---|
| 2010 | 20 W | DNQ | DNQ |
| 2011 | 24 W | DNQ | DNQ |
| 2012 | 36 W | DNQ | DNQ |
| 2013 | 163 WFTDA | DNQ | DNQ |
| 2014 | 190 WFTDA | DNQ | DNQ |
| 2015 | 265 WFTDA | DNQ | DNQ |
| 2016 | 305 WFTDA | DNQ | DNQ |
