= Choice City Rebels =

Roller derby league

- Metro area: Fort Collins, CO
- Country: United States
- Founded: October 2009
- Dissolved: c. 2013
- Teams: All Stars
- Track type(s): Flat
- Website: www.choicecityrebels.com

The Choice City Rebels was a roller derby league based in Fort Collins, Colorado. Founded in 2009, the league last fielded a single team which competed against teams from other leagues.

The league was founded in October 2009 by ten established skaters, who had previously played for FoCo Girls Gone Derby, and it held its first bout in December, against the Slaughterhouse Derby Girls. In 2011, it reached the final of the roller derby tournament at the Greeley Stampede, where it again faced the Slaughterhouse team.

Choice City was accepted into the Women's Flat Track Derby Association Apprentice Program in July 2010, and became a full member of the WFTDA in March 2011. At the end of 2012 Choice City refocused as a co-ed and banked track league.

== WFTDA rankings ==
Season	Final ranking	Playoffs	Championship
2011	25 W	DNQ	DNQ
2012	30 W	DNQ	DNQ
