= East Texas Bombers =

Roller derby league

- Metro area: Lufkin, TX
- Country: United States
- Founded: 2005
- Track type: Flat
- Venue: VFW Post 1836, 1800 Ford Chapel Rd, Lufkin, TX 75901
- Website: www.easttexasbombers.com

The East Texas Bombers is a women's flat track roller derby league based in Lufkin, Texas. Founded in 2005, the league currently consists of a single team which competes against teams from other leagues.

The league was a founding member of the Women's Flat Track Derby Association (WFTDA). However, the Bombers left the organization in mid-2009, becoming only the second league to do so. The league briefly disbanded, but reformed later in the year, with the aim of regaining WFTDA Apprentice membership in 2012. The league's director described the reformed group as a "brand new team". As of 2016, the league comprised members from Lufkin, Central, Texas, Hudson, Texas, and Huntington, Texas.

== WFTDA rankings ==
Season	Final ranking	Playoffs	Championship
2006	30 WFTDA	—	N/A
2007	32 WFTDA	DNQ	DNQ
2008	NR W	DNQ	DNQ
