= A'Salt Creek Roller Derby =

Flat track roller derby league

- Metro area: Casper, Wyoming
- Country: United States
- Founded: December 2009
- Teams: A'Salt Creek Roller Girls
- Track type: Flat
- Venue: Wagon Wheel Skating Rink
- Affiliations: WFTDA

A'Salt Creek Roller Derby (ACRD) is a gender-neutral flat track roller derby league in Casper, Wyoming, founded in December 2009. Player-owned and operated, A'Salt Creek fields a single team that competes against teams from other leagues. The league name is taken from the nearby Salt Creek Oil Field, one of the oldest and most productive oil fields in the area. A'Salt Creek is a member of the Women's Flat Track Derby Association (WFTDA).

ACRG played their first bout against the Rushmore Rollerz in Rapid City, South Dakota, on June 19, 2010, winning by one point (159-158). They hosted their first game in Casper on August 21, 2010, again playing Rushmore. More than 1400 spectators attended the 252–175 win.

ACRG was accepted into the Women's Flat Track Derby Association as an apprentice league in 2012 and graduated to full membership in 2014.

== Rankings ==
Season	Final ranking	Playoffs	Championship
2015	232 WFTDA	DNQ	DNQ
2016	287 WFTDA	DNQ	DNQ
2017	NR WFTDA	DNQ	DNQ
2018	NR WFTDA	DNQ	DNQ

- NR = no end-of-year ranking assigned

== See also ==
- History of roller derby
- List of roller derby leagues
