= Junction City Roller Dolls =

Roller derby league

- Metro area: Ogden, UT
- Country: United States
- Founded: 2008
- Teams: Train Wrecks (A team); Loco Motives (training team)
- Track type: Flat
- Venue: Golden Spike Exhibit Hall
- Affiliations: WFTDA
- Website: junctioncityrollerdolls.com

Junction City Roller Dolls (JCRD) is a women's flat track roller derby league based in Ogden, Utah. Founded in 2008, the league consists of a WFTDA ranked travel team (Trainwrecks) and a team consisting of new skaters and other experienced skaters unable to travel often. Junction City is a member of the Women's Flat Track Derby Association (WFTDA).

== History ==
The league was founded in June 2008, and had around thirty skaters by January 2009. In October 2010, it competed in the Mountain Throwdown tournament, finishing second to the Salt City Derby Girls.

Junction City was accepted into the Women's Flat Track Derby Association Apprentice Program in April 2010, and became a full member of the WFTDA in March 2011.

== WFTDA rankings ==
Season	Final ranking	Playoffs	Championship
2011	30 W	DNQ	DNQ
2012	31 W	DNQ	DNQ
2013	112 WFTDA	DNQ	DNQ
2014	88 WFTDA	DNQ	DNQ
2015	102 WFTDA	DNQ	DNQ
2016	131 WFTDA	DNQ	DNQ
2023	72 WFTDA	DNQ	DNQ
2025	56 WFTDA	DNQ	DNQ
