= Mid-State Roller Derby =

Roller derby league

- Metro area: Stevens Point, WI
- Country: United States
- Founded: 2010
- Teams: All Stars (A team); Bam!B's (B team)
- Track type: Flat
- Venue: Arnott Lions Park Goals (Stevens Point); Marathon Park (Wausau)
- Affiliations: WFTDA
- Website: midstaterollerderby.org

Mid-State Roller Derby (MSRD) is a women's flat track roller derby league based in Stevens Point, Wisconsin. Founded as Mid-State Sisters of Skate in 2010, the league consists of two travel teams which play teams from other leagues. Mid-State is a member of the Women's Flat Track Derby Association (WFTDA).

== History ==
Mid-State was founded in June 2010, with practices starting following try-outs in August. It played its first public bout in June 2011, and by 2013 was attracting up to 200 fans to each bout. However, it suffered a setback in April 2013 when its winter practice venue closed.

The league was accepted as a member of the Women's Flat Track Derby Association Apprentice Programme in July 2012, and became a full member of the WFTDA in June 2013.

Starting in 2015, Mid-State hosts an annual tournament called Uff Da Palooza, attracting teams from Canada and the United States. Uff Da Palooza is an official WFTDA Recognized Tournament.

== WFTDA rankings ==
Season	Final ranking	Playoffs	Championship
2014	148 WFTDA	DNQ	DNQ
2015	138 WFTDA	DNQ	DNQ
2016	215 WFTDA	DNQ	DNQ
2017	278 WFTDA	DNQ	DNQ
2018	298 WFTDA	DNQ	DNQ
