= Cowboy Capital Rollergirls =

Flat track roller derby league

- Metro area: Stephenville, TX
- Country: United States
- Founded: 2011
- Dissolved: c. 2015
- Teams: Pistol Annies (A team); Bolt Action Betties (B team)
- Track type: Flat
- Venue: Brownwood Coliseum; Lone Star Arena
- Affiliations: WFTDA
- Website: www.cowboycapitalrollergirls.com

The Cowboy Capital Rollergirls (CCR) was a women's flat track roller derby league based in Stephenville, Texas. Founded in 2011, the league consisted of two teams which compete against teams from other leagues.

== History ==
By May 2012, the league had twenty-five skaters. In January 2013, it grew further, after the Brown County Debu'Taunts merged with Cowboy Capital.

Cowboy Capital was accepted as a member of the Women's Flat Track Derby Association Apprentice Program in January 2013, and it became a full WFTDA member in September 2013. This was described by league president Ashley Gill as "such a huge milestone not just for us but for our community".

The league was entirely volunteer-run, and has raised large amounts for charity: around $10,000 in 2013.

The last game skated by the A team Pistol Annies was a 280-113 loss to Assassination City Roller Derby in March 2015, and Cowboy Capital was last listed as a ranked WFTDA member with the March 31, 2015 release, in which they were ranked at #230 out of then 238 ranked leagues.

== WFTDA rankings ==
Season	Final ranking	Playoffs	Championship
2014	221 WFTDA	DNQ	DNQ
2015	NR	NA	NA
