= Cleveland Guardians Roller Derby =

Men's roller derby league based in Cleveland, Ohio

- Metro area: Cleveland, OH
- Country: United States
- Founded: 2013
- Track type: Flat
- Venue: Cleveland Heights Community Center
- Affiliations: MRDA
- Org. type: 501c(3)
- Website: https://www.clevelandguardians.com/

Cleveland Guardians Roller Derby (formerly known as Cleveland Men's Roller Derby) is a men's flat-track roller derby league based in Cleveland, Ohio. The Guardians were accepted as a member of the Men's Roller Derby Association (MRDA) in 2016.

== MRDA competition ==
The first recorded Guardians MRDA bout took place in May 2016 against Harm City Roller Derby with a final victory of 190 points over Harm's 129.

== Lawsuit ==
In July 2021, Cleveland's MLB team publicly announced their intent to change the team's name from the Cleveland Indians to the Cleveland Guardians despite the roller derby team already having established the name. Before the MLB team had announced its name change, they had contacted the roller derby team to inform them of the change and requested photos of the intellectual property. The baseball team offered to buy the rights to the Cleveland Guardians name, but did not respond when the roller derby team provided a counteroffer.

The formal complaint was filed under Guardians Roller Derby v. Cleveland Guardians Baseball Company LLC after merchandising companies refused to work with the roller derby team believing they were infringing on the baseball team's rights to the name. The roller derby team's website was overloaded with baseball fans' web traffic and crashed repeatedly due to the name confusion as well.

A resolution was reached in November 2021, a month after the complaint was filed. The settlement was amicable, allowing both teams to use the name Cleveland Guardians for their respective sports and merchandise.
