= Cherry City Roller Derby =

Roller derby league in Oregon, US

- Metro area: Salem, Oregon
- Country: United States
- Founded: 6 April 2009
- Teams: 8-Wheeled Assassins (A-Team), Boneyard Brawlers, Renegades, Cherry Blossoms (Juniors)
- Track type: Flat
- Venue: Madhouse Salem Armory Auditorium
- Affiliations: WFTDA
- Org. type: 501(c)(3)
- Website: www.cherrycityrollerderby.com

Cherry City Roller Derby (CCRD) is a flat track roller derby league based in Salem, Oregon, and a 501(c)(3) non-profit organization. Cherry City is a member of the Women's Flat Track Derby Association (WFTDA).

== History and structure ==
Cherry City began as Cherry City Derby Girls in 2009, with the prompting of Ryan Rogers of Culture Shock of Salem. There were no tryouts initially and over 100 skaters signed up for the league. The first official practice occurred on April 6, 2009. The league's formal end-of-season event, the Black and Red Ball, commemorates this event in April each year.

By March 2010, Cherry City was attracting more than 3,000 fans to its bouts, while the team's skaters ranged from 18 to over 50 years old. CCRD has also hosted a junior roller derby program, the Cherry Blossoms, since 2012. This is open to all genders, ages 7 to 18.

The league was accepted onto the Women's Flat Track Derby Association Apprentice Program in July 2010, and became a full member of the WFTDA in December 2012. Cherry City played their first WFTDA sanctioned game on March 30, 2013, defeating the Sick Town Derby Dames 233-158. In September 2013, Cherry City hosted a WFTDA Division 1 Playoff, and was featured as "League of the Month" for October.

In 2016, the league rebranded as Cherry City Roller Derby. The change was aimed to be more gender-inclusive to non-cisgender members and volunteers. This also reflected a change in the junior program which now began to allow all genders.

At the end of Season 9 in May 2018, CCRD retired the four existing home teams: Dolls of Anarchy, Thrill Kill Kittens, Rydell Belles, and Panty Raiders. This was in order to facilitate a restructure for the following season. Season 10 opened with three newly-formed teams in September 2018: 8-Wheel Assassins, Boneyard Brawlers, and Capital Punishers. In 2019, Capital Punishers changed their name to Renegades. 8-Wheel Assassins is a travel team, competing against teams from other WFTDA leagues. The Boneyard Brawlers (BYB) compete regionally, and Renegades compete on a strictly local level.

== WFTDA rankings ==
| Season | Final ranking | Playoffs | Championship |
|---|---|---|---|
| 2013 | 114 WFTDA | DNQ | DNQ |
| 2014 | 171 WFTDA | DNQ | DNQ |
| 2015 | 124 WFTDA | DNQ | DNQ |
| 2016 | 123 WFTDA | DNQ | DNQ |
| 2017 | 192 WFTDA | DNQ | DNQ |

== Volunteerism ==
Although skating members pay membership fees, many people involved in the CCRD community do not. These affiliates are typically volunteers who assist with Bout Production. Their contributions help maintain production quality while reducing event overhead costs. The organization relies on community support and volunteer participation to sustain its operations.

== Affiliated charities ==
There are six charities that are affiliated with CCRD currently. These charities receive 100% of the proceeds from raffle tickets that are sold during roller derby bouts hosted by CCRD. Additionally, CCRD will participate in events as volunteers with these charities throughout the year.

CCRD is also named as a caretaker in the Adopt a Street program for Salem, Oregon.

Cherry City Roller Derby is responsible for a section of D Street in Salem, Oregon running from 5th street to 20th street. The quarterly event they hold is called the "D Street Clean-Up" by CCRD members. Adult and junior skaters, and CCRD affiliates can be seen on this stretch of street periodically throughout the year in orange vests cleaning the neighborhood.
