= Castle Rock 'n' Rollers =

Roller derby league

- Metro area: Castle Rock, Colorado
- Country: United States
- Founded: 2008
- Teams: All-Stars
- Track type(s): Flat
- Venue: Douglas County Fairgrounds
- Affiliations: WFTDA
- Website: www.castlerocknrollers.org

Castle Rock 'n' Rollers is a women's flat track roller derby league based in Castle Rock, Colorado. Founded in 2008, as of 2017 the league consists of a single team which competes against teams from other leagues. Castle Rock is a member of the Women's Flat Track Derby Association (WFTDA).

The league played its first home bout in June 2009, against the Naughty Pines Derby Dames. and took their first win against the same opposition, in September.

The league was accepted into the Women's Flat Track Derby Association Apprentice Program in April 2010, and became a full member of the WFTDA in June 2011.

== WFTDA rankings ==
Season	Final ranking	Playoffs	Championship
2012	38 W	DNQ	DNQ
2013	173 WFTDA	DNQ	DNQ
2014	NR WFTDA	DNQ	DNQ
2015	250 WFTDA	DNQ	DNQ
2016	301 WFTDA	DNQ	DNQ
2017	304 WFTDA	DNQ	DNQ
2018	NR WFTDA	DNQ	DNQ

- NR = no end-of-year ranking assigned
