= Southern Illinois Roller Girls =

Roller derby league

Southern Illinois Roller Gremlins
- Metro area: Marion, IL
- Country: United States
- Founded: 2009
- Teams: Power SIRG (A team); Rolling Blackouts (B team)
- Track type: Flat
- Venue: The Pavilion of The City of Marion
- Affiliations: WFTDA
- Website: www.soillrollergirls.com

The Southern Illinois Roller Gremlins (SIRG, or So Ill Roller Gremlins) is a women's flat track roller derby league based in Marion, Illinois. So Ill is a member of the Women's Flat Track Derby Association (WFTDA).

== History ==
The league was founded in June 2009 by a group of women from the area and So Ill Roller Girls had their first public scrimmage in December 2009, and their first official home bout in April 2010. It was accepted into the Women's Flat Track Derby Association Apprentice Program in January 2011, and became a full member of the WFTDA in January 2012.

Southern Illinois Roller Gremlins currently play at The Pavilion of the city of Marion, and their regular bouting season runs from March until November.

In 2023, the league transitioned to a co-ed format and rebranded as the Southern Illinois Roller Gremlins. Originally founded in June 2009 as the first all-female flat-track roller derby league in Southern Illinois, the club became a full member of the Women's Flat Track Derby Association (WFTDA) in January 2012. The team competes at the Pavilion in Marion, Illinois and continues to operate as a community-focused athletic organization.

== WFTDA rankings ==
Season	Final ranking	Playoffs	Championship
2012	34 NC	DNQ	DNQ
2013	169 WFTDA	DNQ	DNQ
2014	180 WFTDA	DNQ	DNQ
2015	195 WFTDA	DNQ	DNQ
2016	281 WFTDA	DNQ	DNQ
