= SoCo Derby Dollz =

Roller derby league

- Metro area: Pueblo, CO
- Country: United States
- Founded: 2007
- Track type(s): Flat
- Venue: Colorado State Fair Events Center
- Affiliations: WFTDA
- Website: socoderbydollz.com

SoCo Derby Dollz is a women's flat track roller derby league based in Pueblo, Colorado. Founded in 2007, the league consists of two teams which compete against teams from other leagues.

The league was founded as "Pueblo Derby Devil Dollz" in December 2007 by a group of interested women, including Lisa Conant, a local roller skater. By April 2010, the team had more than fifty skaters, and had attracted crowds of more than 2,000 fans.

The league was accepted into the Women's Flat Track Derby Association Apprentice Program in November 2009, and became a full member of the WFTDA in September 2010.

As Pueblo Derby, the league last appeared in the WFTDA rankings with the April 30, 2016 release, at 159th overall. At some point after that, the league rebranded as SoCo Derby Dollz, retaining WFTDA membership, but has yet to receive a ranking under the new name.

== WFTDA rankings ==
Season	Final ranking	Playoffs	Championship
2011	27 W	DNQ	DNQ
2012	34 W	DNQ	DNQ
2013	139 WFTDA	DNQ	DNQ
2014	188 WFTDA	DNQ	DNQ
2015	158 WFTDA	DNQ	DNQ
2016	NR WFTDA	DNQ	DNQ
2017	NR WFTDA	DNQ	DNQ
2018	NR WFTDA	DNQ	DNQ

- NR = no end-of-year ranking assigned
