= Rage City Roller Derby =

Roller derby league

- Metro area: Anchorage, AK
- Country: United States
- Founded: 2007
- Teams: All*Stars (A team); Sockeye Sallys (B team)
- Track type: Flat
- Venue: O'Malley Sports Center
- Affiliations: WFTDA
- Website: www.ragecityrollerderby.org

Rage City Roller Derby is a women's flat track roller derby league based in Anchorage, Alaska. Rage City currently consists of four teams, the Rage City All*Stars, Sockeye Sallys, Devil‘s Club, and Rage City Juniors. The Rage City All-Stars represent the best of Rage City and travel all over the world to compete in bouts. Sockeye Sallys and Devil’s Club are RCRD‘s home teams, playing mostly home games and bouts throughout the state. The Rage City Juniors are a co-ed team ages 7-17. Rage City is a member of the Women's Flat Track Derby Association (WFTDA).

== History ==
The league was founded as Rage City Rollergirls in 2007 by a group of women, some of whom had previously watched roller derby elsewhere in the United States. It played its first bout in May 2008, attracting a crowd of more than 1,000 fans. This was the first flat track roller derby bout in Alaska.

Rage City joined the Women's Flat Track Derby Association Apprentice program in April 2010, and became full members of the WFTDA in March 2011.

== WFTDA rankings ==
former league logo

Season	Final ranking	Playoffs	Championship
2012	26 W	DNQ	DNQ
2013	102 WFTDA	DNQ	DNQ
2014	91 WFTDA	DNQ	DNQ
2015	121 WFTDA	DNQ	DNQ
2016	93 WFTDA	DNQ	DNQ
2017	63 WFTDA	DNQ	DNQ
2018	93 WFTDA	DNQ	DNQ
