= Monterey Bay Roller Derby =

Roller derby league

- Metro area: Monterey, CA
- Country: United States
- Founded: 2010
- Teams: Beasts of Eden (travel); Cannery Rollers
- Track type: Flat
- Venue: Various
- Affiliations: WFTDA
- Website: www.montereybayrollerderby.org

Monterey Bay Roller Derby (MBRD), formerly Monterey Bay Derby Dames, is a women's flat track roller derby league based in Monterey, California. Founded in 2010, the league consists of two teams which compete against teams from other leagues, and the league is a member of the Women's Flat Track Derby Association (WFTDA).

== History ==
The league was founded in April 2010 by three skaters associated with Santa Cruz Roller Derby but living in Monterey, who wanted to play for a more local league. It played its first bout in February 2011, attracting more than 500 fans. Local famous author John Steinbeck and his writing influenced the league's team names.

In July 2011, Monterey Bay was accepted as an apprentice member of the Women's Flat Track Derby Association. In December 2013, the league was accepted as a full member WFTDA league.

Monterey Bay Derby Dames changed their name to Monterey Bay Roller Derby in 2019. Their home rink, Water City, closed during the COVID-19 pandemic shutdowns. Former teams include Babes of Wrath, Steinwreckers and the Dread Ponies (junior).

According to California Derby Galaxy, MBRD will compete in the Quasars division for the 2023 season.

== WFTDA rankings ==
Season	Final ranking	Playoffs	Championship
2014	219 WFTDA	DNQ	DNQ
2015	182 WFTDA	DNQ	DNQ
2016	155 WFTDA	DNQ	DNQ
2017	157 WFTDA	DNQ	DNQ
2018	228 WFTDA	DNQ	DNQ
2019	232 WFTDA	DNQ	DNQ
