= Vette City Roller Derby =

Roller derby league

- Metro area: Bowling Green, KY
- Country: United States
- Founded: 2009
- Teams: Vixens (A team); Venom (B team)
- Track type(s): Flat
- Venue: Bowling Green Skate Center
- Affiliations: WFTDA
- Website: www.vettecityrollerderby.org

Vette City Roller Derby (VCRD) is a women's flat track roller derby league based in Bowling Green, Kentucky. Founded in 2009, the league consists of two teams, which compete against teams from other leagues. Vette City is a member of the Women's Flat Track Derby Association (WFTDA).

== History ==
The league was founded, as the Vette City Vixens, by Jenni Johnson, after she saw the Nashville Roller Girls play. It has attracted publicity for hosting children's skating events.

The league was accepted as a member of the Women's Flat Track Derby Association Apprentice Program in July 2012, and became a full member of the WFTDA in June 2013.

In early 2015, the league was forced to cancel some scheduled home events when their former venue, the Skate Box, was sold. During this time the league lost some members due to inactivity. As of 2017, Vette City's venue is the Bowling Green Skate Center.

== WFTDA rankings ==
Season	Final ranking	Playoffs	Championship
2013	145 WFTDA	DNQ	DNQ
2014	113 WFTDA	DNQ	DNQ
2015	273 WFTDA	DNQ	DNQ
2016	304 WFTDA	DNQ	DNQ
2017	292 WFTDA	DNQ	DNQ
2018	290 WFTDA	DNQ	DNQ
