= Bay State Brawlers Roller Derby =

Roller derby league

- Metro area: Fitchburg/Leominster, MA
- Country: United States
- Founded: 2008
- Teams: Brawlers (A team); Bantams (B team)
- Track type(s): Flat
- Venue: Wallace Civic Center
- Affiliations: WFTDA
- Website: baystatebrawlers.com

Bay State Brawlers Roller Derby, (BSB), is a flat-track roller derby league based in the twin cities of Fitchburg and Leominster, Massachusetts. Founded in 2008, Bay State is a member of the Women's Flat Track Derby Association (WFTDA).

== History and Organization ==
Bay State was founded in 2008 as "Central Mass Roller Derby", and became Bay State Brawlers Roller Derby in 2011. Bay State joined the WFTDA Apprentice Program in 2013, and became a full member league in July 2014.

In 2014, the league featured 5 teams, the Petticoat Pushers, Brawlin’ Broads, Bluestocking Bombers, LumberJackies, and Switchblade Sallies. From 2017 to 2020, the league had two teams that played teams from other leagues: the A-level Punishers and the Brawlin' Broads B team, with home events held at the Wallace Civic Center on the Fitchburg State University campus. Bay State Brawlers returned to play after the COVID-19 hiatus with their first home season following the break in 2023.

In 2020, the A team dropped the "Punishers" name and began skating as the Brawlers. In 2023, the B team was renamed to the Bantams.

As of 2024, "Bay State Brawlers Roller Derby is composed of two competitive travel teams, the Brawlers (our WFTDA charter team) and the Bantams (our “B” team), officials, volunteers, and new recruits."

The league is a non-profit organization, whose 30-40 members fundraise for various causes.

=== WFTDA rankings ===
Season	Final ranking	Playoffs	Championship
2015	187 WFTDA	DNQ	DNQ
2016	160 WFTDA	DNQ	DNQ
2017	148 WFTDA	DNQ	DNQ
2018	157 WFTDA	DNQ	DNQ
2019	113 WFTDA	DNQ	DNQ
2023	96 WFTDA North America Northeast	DNQ	DNQ
