= Kaiserslautern Roller Derby =

Roller derby league

- Metro area: Kaiserslautern
- Country: Germany
- Founded: 2010
- Track type: Flat
- Venue: Uni SportHalle
- Affiliations: WFTDA
- Website: www.kaiserslauternrollerderby.org

Kaiserslautern Roller Derby (KRD) is a women's flat track roller derby league based in Kaiserslautern, Germany. Founded in 2010, the league consists of two teams, which compete against teams from other leagues.

KRD is a member of the Women's Flat Track Derby Association (WFTDA).

== History ==
The league was founded in June 2010 as the K-Town Derby Girls. The founders were soon joined by three American women who had previous experience of the sport. While many members work at the town's United States Air Force base, being part of the Kaiserslautern Military Community, the league has also included German, French, Canadian and British members.

In 2011, the league changed its name to Roller Girls of the Apocalypse (RGA).

RGA logo

The league has played internationally against a variety of opponents and, for example, were the Pirate Brides WupperValley's first opponent. Members of KRD have participated in two German National Championships.

In July 2012, the league was accepted as a member of the Women's Flat Track Derby Association Apprentice Programme, and became a full member of the WFTDA in March 2014.

2019 marked another name and logo change, switching to Kaiserslauten Roller Derby as they are currently known. This change was to strengthen the bond and recognition between their local community and the team.

== WFTDA rankings ==
Season	Final ranking	Playoffs	Championship
2015	268 WFTDA	DNQ	DNQ
2016	313 WFTDA	DNQ	DNQ
2017	297 WFTDA	DNQ	DNQ
2018	348 WFTDA	DNQ	DNQ
2019	366 WFTDA	DNQ	DNQ
