= Slaughter County Roller Vixens =

Roller derby league in Washington, United States

- Metro area: Port Orchard, WA
- Country: United States
- Founded: 2006
- Dissolved: 2014
- Teams: Saints of Slaughter (travel team); Death Rattle Rollers; Terrormedixxx
- Track type: Flat
- Venue: Various
- Affiliations: WFTDA
- Website: www.slaughtercountyrollervixens.com

The Slaughter County Roller Vixens (SCRV) is a roller derby league based in Kitsap County, Washington, US. Founded in 2006, the league currently comprises two teams, and a mixed team which competes against teams from other leagues.

Kitsap County was originally named Slaughter County. The league competed in their home county for the first time in April 2008.

The Vixens joined the Women's Flat Track Derby Association (WFTDA) in September 2008. In 2010, the league ran the Wild West Showdown, a major tournament involving nineteen WFTDA leagues. The travel team gradually rose in the WFTDA rankings, reaching eleventh in the West Region by the third quarter of 2011. In 2012, the league split with a new league, "Northwest Derby Company" forming. The Vixens hosted the "Wild West Showdown" in 2014 and that was their last event.

Season	Q4 ranking	Regionals	Championship
2009	13	DNQ	DNQ
2010	15	DNQ	DNQ
2011	11	DNQ	DNQ
