= New River Valley Roller Girls =

Roller derby league

- Metro area: Christiansburg, VA
- Country: United States
- Founded: 2007
- Teams: All Stars (A team); Bruisin' Burgs (B team)
- Track type(s): Flat
- Venue: Adventure World
- Affiliations: WFTDA
- Website: nrvrollergirls.com

The New River Valley Roller Girls, often known as the NRV Roller Girls, is a women's flat track roller derby league based in Christiansburg, Virginia. Founded in 2007, the league consists of two teams which compete against teams from other leagues. New River Valley is a member of the Women's Flat Track Derby Association (WFTDA).

== History ==
The league was founded in February 2007 by a local woman known as "Speed Junkie". Other early members included Kacey Huntington, known as "I. M. Pain", who later became a leading player with the Charm City Roller Girls.

NRV was accepted into the Women's Flat Track Derby Association Apprentice Program in July 2010, and became a full member of the WFTDA in December 2011.

== WFTDA rankings ==
Season	Final ranking	Playoffs	Championship
2012	23 E	DNQ	DNQ
2013	130 WFTDA	DNQ	DNQ
2014	174 WFTDA	DNQ	DNQ
