= Mississippi Valley Mayhem =

Roller derby league

- Metro area: La Crosse, WI
- Country: United States
- Teams: All Stars
- Track type(s): Flat
- Venue: Onalaska Omni Center
- Affiliations: WFTDA
- Website: mississippivalleymayhem.com

Mississippi Valley Mayhem (MVM) is a women's flat track roller derby league based in La Crosse, Wisconsin. Founded in 2008, the league consists of a single team which competes against teams from other leagues. Mississippi Valley is a member of the Women's Flat Track Derby Association (WFTDA).

== History ==
The Mayhem was founded in August 2008 by two local women, Amanda Boucher and Stephanie Powers, after Boucher encountered the sport on a visit to Austin, Texas. By May 2009, the league had twenty skaters, and had played two bouts to around 200 fans.

The league was accepted into the Women's Flat Track Derby Association Apprentice Program in January 2010, and it graduated to full membership in December 2012. In May 2011, one of its practice venues, the Green Island Ice Arena, was severely damaged by a tornado.

== WFTDA rankings ==
Season	Final ranking	Playoffs	Championship
2014	222 WFTDA	DNQ	DNQ
2015	214 WFTDA	DNQ	DNQ
2016	255 WFTDA	DNQ	DNQ
