= Denali Destroyers Roller Derby =

Roller derby league

- Metro area: Wasilla, Alaska
- Country: United States
- Founded: 2010
- Teams: Denali Destroyers; Denali Dragons (junior)
- Track type: Flat
- Venue: Palmer MTA Events Center
- Affiliations: WFTDA

Denali Destroyers Roller Derby (DDRD) is a women's flat track roller derby league based in Wasilla, Alaska. Founded in 2010, the league consists of a single team, which competes against teams from other leagues.

== History ==
The league was founded in July 2010 and played its first season in 2012-2013, winning a majority of its eight bouts. It worked closely with a junior roller derby league, the Valley Vixens, though that junior team dissolved and the Denali Dragons were formed in January 2024.

Denali Destroyer Dolls former logo

Denali was accepted as a member of the Women's Flat Track Derby Association Apprentice Program in October 2012 and became a full WFTDA member in September 2013. However, the league never earned a ranked position within the WFTDA rankings and is no longer a member of WFTDA.

The Denali Destroyers have been involved in a variety of local events, including a bra-related art exhibition.

In June 2023, Denali Destroyer Dolls changed its Facebook profile picture to a new logo, notably dropping the 'Dolls' portion of the team's name. The team has since been known as the Denali Destroyers.

== Competition ==
Skater Kandi Koated was voted onto the Alaska All-Star Team Roster list in 2013.

Skater and trainer Athena Latina was voted onto the Alaska All-Star Team roster list in 2013, and became the first skater to be voted Top Coach as well as being on the roster.
