= Rocktown Rollers =

Roller derby league

- Metro area: Harrisonburg, VA
- Country: United States
- Founded: 2008
- Teams: All-Stars
- Track type(s): Flat
- Venue: Funky's Skate Center
- Affiliations: WFTDA
- Website: www.rocktownrollers.com

Rocktown Rollers (RTR) is a women's flat track roller derby league based in Harrisonburg, Virginia. Founded in 2008, the league consists of a single team which competes against teams from other leagues. Rocktown is a member of the Women's Flat Track Derby Association (WFTDA).

== History ==
The league was founded in early 2008 by Janna "Janna-cide" Basye and Troch, two locals. It hosted its first home bout early in 2009, attracting around 500 fans.

Rocktown was accepted into the Women's Flat Track Derby Association Apprentice Program in July 2010, and became a full member of the WFTDA in June 2011.

== WFTDA rankings ==
Season	Final ranking	Playoffs	Championship
2012	37 E	DNQ	DNQ
2013	168 WFTDA	DNQ	DNQ
2014	218 WFTDA	DNQ	DNQ
2015	255 WFTDA	DNQ	DNQ
2016	302 WFTDA	DNQ	DNQ
2017	NR	DNQ	DNQ

- NR = no end-of-year rank assigned
