= Okinawa Roller Derby =

Roller derby league

- Metro area: Okinawa
- Country: Japan
- Founded: 2010
- Teams: Undertow (A team); Kokeshi Roller Dolls (B team)
- Track type(s): Flat
- Venue: Comprehensive Park Arena; Risner Gym
- Affiliations: WFTDA
- Website: www.okinawarollerderby.com

Okinawa Roller Derby is a women's flat track roller derby league based in Okinawa, Japan. Founded in 2010, the league currently consists of two teams, an all star team which competes worldwide and a B team which competes against teams from other leagues in Japan. Okinawa Roller Derby is a member of the Women's Flat Track Derby Association (WFTDA).

== History ==
The league was founded as "Kokeshi Roller Dolls" in August 2010 by Amanda Harms (known as "Pisa Cake") and Nicole King ("Nurse Fight'n Bail"). It held its first practice in October, with only six members, but had twenty skaters by the end of the month, and in January 2011 formed three intraleague teams. In May, it played its first bout, an intraleague contest. This attracted more than eight hundred fans. Many of the league's members are not native Okinawans, and are often expatriate Americans in the armed forces, or come to Japan for work or with family.

In October 2011, Kokeshi was accepted as a member of the Women's Flat Track Derby Association Apprentice Programme, and it became a full member of the WFTDA in June 2013.

In March 2017, the league announced a rebrand as Okinawa Roller Derby, maintaining the Kokeshi Roller Dolls name for its B team.

== WFTDA rankings ==
Season	Final ranking	Playoffs	Championship
2014	214 WFTDA	DNQ	DNQ
2015	223 WFTDA	DNQ	DNQ
2016	317 WFTDA	DNQ	DNQ
