= Classic City Rollergirls =

Women's roller derby league in Athens, Georgia, US

- Metro area: Athens, GA
- Country: United States
- Founded: 2006
- Teams: All Stars (A team); Bad News Bs (B team)
- Track type: Flat
- Venue: The Classic Center
- Affiliations: WFTDA
- Website: classiccityrollergirls.com

The Classic City Rollergirls (CCRG) is a women's flat track roller derby league based in Athens, Georgia. Founded in 2006, the league currently consists of two teams which compete against teams from other leagues. Classic City is a member of the Women's Flat Track Derby Association (WFTDA).

== History ==
The league was founded by two local women, Dayna Noffke (known as "Zomberella") and Jen Albano (known as "Third Degree Burn"), who were fans of the Atlanta Rollergirls, and was originally named Athens Roller Derby. By the middle of the year, it had around twenty skaters. By April 2007, when it played its first exhibition bout, it had adopted its current name. During year 2007, the league split into two competing teams, the "Dames of Maim" and the "Hittin' Misses", but it decided to merge back to a single All Star team later in the year, complementing this with a B team in 2010. By 2011, its bouts were a standing room only.

Classic City was accepted into the Women's Flat Track Derby Association Apprentice Program in January 2011, and became a full member of the WFTDA in March 2012.

The 2016 team captain is #20 Louis Strongarm. She was also team captain in 2015 and consistently rates as one of the team's most productive jammers.

== WFTDA rankings ==
Season	Final ranking	Playoffs	Championship
2013	158 WFTDA	DNQ	DNQ
2014	162 WFTDA	DNQ	DNQ
2015	146 WFTDA	DNQ	DNQ
2016	150 WFTDA	DNQ	DNQ
2017	117 WFTDA	DNQ	DNQ
2018	80 WFTDA	DNQ	DNQ
2019	72 WFTDA	DNQ	DNQ
