= Derby City Roller Girls =

Roller derby league

- Metro area: Louisville, KY
- Country: United States
- Founded: 2007
- Teams: All Stars (A team); Bourbon Brawlers (B team)
- Track type(s): Flat
- Venue: Champ's Rollerdrome
- Affiliations: WFTDA
- Website: www.derbycityrollergirls.com

The Derby City Roller Girls (DCRG) is a women's flat track roller derby league based in Louisville, Kentucky. Founded in 2007, the league currently consists of two teams, which compete against teams from other leagues. Derby City is a member of the Women's Flat Track Derby Association (WFTDA).

== History ==
The league was founded in 2007 by Jenni Ahlrich, known as "Bad Penny", after she had met a team from Austin, Texas. In its early days, it played at the Kentucky State Fairgrounds, often selling out the venue.

The league joined the Women's Flat Track Derby Association (WFTDA) in 2009, and played its first WFTDA regulation bout against the Naptown Roller Girls in January 2010.

== WFTDA rankings ==
Season	Final ranking	Playoffs	Championship
2010	19 NC	DNQ	DNQ
2011	21 NC	DNQ	DNQ
2012	28 NC	DNQ	DNQ
2013	138 WFTDA	DNQ	DNQ
2014	136 WFTDA	DNQ	DNQ
2015	109 WFTDA	DNQ	DNQ
2016	145 WFTDA	DNQ	DNQ
2017	151 WFTDA	DNQ	DNQ
