= Enid Roller Girls =

Roller derby league

- Metro area: Enid, OK
- Country: United States
- Founded: 2010
- Teams: All-Stars
- Track type(s): Flat
- Venue: Enid Event Center; Skatebox
- Affiliations: WFTDA
- Website: www.enidrollergirls.com

The Enid Roller Girls (ERG) was a women's flat track roller derby league based in Enid, Oklahoma. Founded in 2010, the league consisted of a single team, which competed against teams from other leagues, and was a member of the Women's Flat Track Derby Association (WFTDA).

== History ==
The league was founded by Jamie Garen, known as "Jme Jawbreaker", after she saw the sport played in Oklahoma City. Enid developed strong links with the Oklahoma Victory Dolls, and by the start of 2011, the squad had twelve skaters and was focusing on finding a permanent venue for training and future bouts. By 2013, it was playing against local rivals such as Oklahoma City Roller Derby, and had skaters from a wide variety of backgrounds.

The league was accepted as a member of the Women's Flat Track Derby Association Apprentice Programme in July 2012, and became a full member of the WFTDA in June 2013.

The team collapsed in November 2019 after many players, such as all-stars Redneck Renegade and Burnout Bandit left the team.

== WFTDA rankings ==
Season	Final ranking	Playoffs	Championship
2014	215 WFTDA	DNQ	DNQ
2015	239 WFTDA	DNQ	DNQ
2016	N/R WFTDA	DNQ	DNQ
2017	NR WFTDA	DNQ	DNQ
2018	NR WFTDA	DNQ	DNQ

- NR = no end-of-year ranking assigned
