= Nantes Roller Derby =

Roller derby league

- Metro area: Nantes
- Country: France
- Founded: 2010
- Teams: Duchesses (A team); Divines Machines (B team); Les Créatures de Neptune
- Track type(s): Flat
- Venue: Le Hangar
- Affiliations: WFTDA
- Website: www.nantesrollerderby.fr

Nantes Roller Derby is a women's flat track roller derby league based in Nantes in France. Founded in 2010, the league consists of three teams, and two mixed teams which compete against teams from other leagues. Nantes is a member of the Women's Flat Track Derby Association (WFTDA).

== History ==
The league was founded in October 2010 by Katie Bourner, an English student, who later captained the A team as "Psychokat". Within weeks, she and her friends had recruited thirty trainees, and by early 2012, the league had 65 skaters.

Nantes held its first public exhibition games in May 2011, mixed scrimmages with Rouen, Brest and Rennes, and by 2012 was regularly playing sell-out bouts.

In October 2013, Nantes were accepted as a member of the Women's Flat Track Derby Association Apprentice Programme. Nantes became a full member of the WFTDA in October 2014.

== Team A : The Duc.hesse.s de Nantes ==
The Duc.hesse.s de Nantes are the A team of the Nantes Roller Derby club, founded in 2010. This non-profit sports association, based in Nantes, comprises several teams, including the Duc.hesses (A team). The club is affiliated with the French Roller Sports Federation (FFRS) and has been a member of the Women's Flat Track Derby Association (WFTDA) since 2013.

The Duc.hesses played their first match in November 2011 and have since participated in hundreds of matches across France and Europe, including friendly matches, the French Elite Championships, and WFTDA competitions. They were the runners-up in the French Championships in 2023 and 2022. Currently ranked among the top 3 European teams, they hope to continue climbing the rankings, with the ambition to compete in the WFTDA Global Championships in Portland, Oregon (USA) on November 1, 2, and 3, 2024.

They also participate in local tournaments such as the West Track Story and the Hangar Games, which energize the local area. The team values include creating a safe environment, respect, team spirit, and solidarity.

== WFTDA rankings ==
Season	Final ranking	Playoffs	Championship
2015	191 WFTDA	DNQ	DNQ
2016	152 WFTDA	DNQ	DNQ
