= Dockyard Derby Dames =

Roller derby league

- Metro area: Tacoma, WA
- Country: United States
- Founded: 2005
- Teams: Waves of Mutilation (A team); Femme Fianna; Marauding Mollys; The Trampires
- Track type: Flat
- Venue: Pierce College
- Affiliations: WFTDA
- Website: dockyardderbydames.com

The Dockyard Derby Dames (DyDD) is a women's flat track roller derby league based in Tacoma, Washington. Founded in 2005, the league currently consists of three teams, and a mixed team which competes against teams from other leagues, and is a member of the Women's Flat Track Derby Association (WFTDA).

== History ==
The league played its first public bout in May 2007. By late 2009, it had around 60 skaters. It has rented practice space at the Tacoma Armory.

The league was accepted into the Women's Flat Track Derby Association Apprentice Program in January 2010, and became a full member of the WFTDA in December. Dockyard Derby Dames did not skate in any WFTDA-sanctioned games between May 2015 and May 2017, and did not receive a year-end ranking for 2016.

== WFTDA rankings ==
Season	Final ranking	Playoffs	Championship
2011	21 W	DNQ	DNQ
2012	35 W	DNQ	DNQ
2013	154 WFTDA	DNQ	DNQ
2014	223 WFTDA	DNQ	DNQ
2015	213 WFTDA	DNQ	DNQ
2016	N/A	DNQ	DNQ
