= Mason-Dixon Roller Vixens =

Roller derby league

- Metro area: Hagerstown, MD
- Country: United States
- Founded: 2007
- Teams: All-Stars (A-team); Cannon Brawlers (B-team)
- Track type(s): Flat
- Venue: Turner's Skate Palace
- Affiliations: WFTDA
- Website: masondixonrollervixens.com

Mason-Dixon Roller Vixens (MDRV) is a women's flat track roller derby league based in Hagerstown, Maryland, and a member of the Women's Flat Track Derby Association (WFTDA). Founded in 2007, it consists of two teams: the WFTDA-ranked travel team, the All-Stars, and its B-team, the Cannon Brawlers.

== History ==
Mason-Dixon Roller Vixens was established in June 2007, and initially practiced in Greencastle, Pennsylvania. It started with eight skaters, and increased to twenty by mid-2009. Several of them broke off to form Key City Roller Derby, a league in Frederick, Maryland. Key City Roller Derby dissolved in 2016 and several of its remaining members joined MDRV.

Mason-Dixon was accepted into the Women's Flat Track Derby Association Apprentice Program in April 2010, and became a full member in March 2012.

== WFTDA rankings ==
Season	Final ranking	Playoffs	Championship
2013	165 WFTDA	DNQ	DNQ
2014	195 WFTDA	DNQ	DNQ
2015	253 WFTDA	DNQ	DNQ
2016	249 WFTDA	DNQ	DNQ
2017	217 WFTDA	DNQ	DNQ
2018	205 WFTDA	DNQ	DNQ
