= Ark Valley High Rollers =

Roller derby league

- Metro area: Salida, CO
- Country: United States
- Founded: 2010
- Teams: All Stars (A team); Continental Dividers (B team)
- Track type(s): Flat
- Venue: Chaffee County Fairgrounds
- Affiliations: WFTDA
- Website: arkvalleyhighrollers.com

Ark Valley High Rollers (AVHR) is a women's flat track roller derby league based in Salida, Colorado. Founded in 2010, the league currently consists of two mixed teams which compete against teams from other leagues. Ark Valley is a member of the Women's Flat Track Derby Association (WFTDA).

The league started training together in March 2010, and played its first full bout in January 2011, losing to Pikes Peak Derby Dames' B team.

Ark Valley was accepted into the Women's Flat Track Derby Association Apprentice Program in April 2011, and became a full member of the WFTDA in December 2011. It claims to be the WFTDA member with the smallest population base.

== Rankings ==
Season	Final ranking	Playoffs	Championship
2012	22 W	DNQ	DNQ
2013	131 WFTDA	DNQ	DNQ
2014	139 WFTDA	DNQ	DNQ
2015	192 WFTDA	DNQ	DNQ
2016	169 WFTDA	DNQ	DNQ
2017	200 WFTDA	DNQ	DNQ
2018	NR WFTDA	DNQ	DNQ

- NR = no end-of-year ranking assigned
