= Spindletop Roller Girls =

Roller derby league

- Metro area: Beaumont, Texas, U.S.
- Country: United States
- Founded: 2008
- Teams: All Stars (A team)
- Track type(s): Flat
- Venue: Beaumont Civic Center
- Affiliations: WFTDA
- Website: www.spindletoprollergirls.com

Spindletop Roller Girls is a women's flat track roller derby league based in Beaumont, Texas. Founded in 2008, as of 2017 the league consists of a single All Star team that competes against teams from other leagues. Spindletop is a member of the Women's Flat Track Derby Association (WFTDA).

== History ==
Founded in November 2008, by January 2009 the league had ten skaters and was hoping to recruit more, in order to put a bouting team together. The formation of the Bayou Outlaw Rollergirls, based in Orange, Texas, was inspired by the Spindletop league, and the two maintained close links. For the 2012 season, the Bayou Outlaws merged with Spindletop, becoming a new home team for the league.

Spindletop was accepted into the Women's Flat Track Derby Association Apprentice Program in January 2010, and became a full member of the WFTDA in December.

== WFTDA rankings ==
Season	Final ranking	Playoffs	Championship
2011	26 SC	DNQ	DNQ
2012	31 SC	DNQ	DNQ
2013	175 WFTDA	DNQ	DNQ
2014	224 WFTDA	DNQ	DNQ
2015	274 WFTDA	DNQ	DNQ
2016	289 WFTDA	DNQ	DNQ
