= Bellingham Roller Betties =

Roller derby league

- Metro area: Bellingham, WA
- Country: United States
- Founded: 2006
- Teams: Bellingham All-Stars (A team); The Cog Blockers; Team F.L.A.S.H; Tough Love; Grit Pit
- Track type: Flat
- Venue: Whatcom Community College
- Affiliations: WFTDA
- Website: www.bellinghamrollerbetties.com

The Bellingham Roller Betties is a flat track roller derby league based in Bellingham, Washington. Founded in 2006, Bellingham is a member of the Women's Flat Track Derby Association (WFTDA).

== History and structure ==
Founded in November 2006, the Betties had more than thirty members by the following March. The league joined the Women's Flat Track Derby Association (WFTDA) in 2009. In 2011, it competed in the Dust Devil tournament. The league currently consists of one open level team, three home teams, and a mixed team which competes against teams from other leagues.

== Rankings ==
Season	Final ranking	Playoffs	Championship
2010	18 W	DNQ	DNQ
2011	16 W	DNQ	DNQ
2012	24 W	DNQ	DNQ
2013	111 WFTDA	DNQ	DNQ
2014	157 WFTDA	DNQ	DNQ
2015	203 WFTDA	DNQ	DNQ
2016	176 WFTDA	DNQ	DNQ
2017	229 WFTDA	DNQ	DNQ
2018	235 WFTDA	DNQ	DNQ
