= Mississippi Rollergirls =

Roller derby league

- Metro area: Ocean Springs, MS
- Country: United States
- Founded: 2006
- Track type(s): Flat
- Venue: Duo Dance Event Center
- Affiliations: WFTDA
- Website: www.mississippirollergirls.com

Mississippi Rollergirls is a women's flat track roller derby league based in Gautier, Mississippi. Founded in 2006, the league consists of a single team, which competes against teams from other leagues. Mississippi Rollergirls is a member of the Women's Flat Track Derby Association (WFTDA).

== History ==
The league was founded in 2006, and describes itself as having been the first flat track women's roller derby league in Mississippi. It was bouting before the end of the following year.

In October 2011, the league was accepted as an apprentice member of the Women's Flat Track Derby Association, and it graduated to full membership in December 2012. It was reported in April 2017 that the league was struggling with attrition due to injuries and life changes among its members.

== WFTDA rankings ==
Season	Final ranking	Playoffs	Championship
2013	136 WFTDA	DNQ	DNQ
2014	206 WFTDA	DNQ	DNQ
2015	196 WFTDA	DNQ	DNQ
2016	272 WFTDA	DNQ	DNQ
