= Humboldt Roller Derby =

Roller derby league

- Metro area: Eureka, CA
- Country: United States
- Founded: 2007
- Teams: Redwood Rollers (Traveling); Widow Makers (Home); Root Force (Traveling); North Jetty Bettys (Home)
- Track type: Flat
- Venue: Redwood Acres
- Affiliations: WFTDA
- Website: humboldtrollerderby.com

Humboldt Roller Derby is a roller derby league based in Eureka, California. Founded in 2007, the league currently consists of two teams which compete against teams from other leagues.

Humboldt Roller Derby was founded in February 2007 by Jennifer McMahon, skating under the name "Jenneral Ms. Chief". Reaching out to others with community sports experience, such as John Fesler and Jerry Nutter of the Humboldt Crabs baseball organization, helped HRD to become successful. In 2009 HRD formed a community-run board of directors and in 2010 McMahon officially donated Humboldt Roller Derby to the community of Humboldt.

Jennifer McMahon also reached out to established roller derby skater Bonnie D.Stroir, who had posted a craigslist ad in the Humboldt Region seeking someone to help her establish a league for her expected move. McMahon responded to Beck and soon McMahon would travel to meet Beck and learn the details of starting a league.

Humboldt played its first bout in May 2008. It gradually strengthened, and by mid-2010 was able to finish fourth in a tournament hosted by Central Coast Roller Derby. In April 2010, it was accepted into the Women's Flat Track Derby Association Apprentice Program, and it became a full member of the WFTDA in January 2012.
