= Rockford Rage =

Roller derby league

- Metro area: Rockford, IL
- Country: United States
- Founded: 2006
- Track type: Flat
- Venue: UW Health Sports Factory
- Affiliations: WFTDA

Rockford Rage is a women's flat track roller derby league based in Rockford, Illinois. Founded in 2006, the league consists of a single team which competes against teams from other leagues. Rockford is a member of the Women's Flat Track Derby Association (WFTDA).

== History ==
The league was founded in mid-2006 by Rebecca Engebretson and others, with its first practices held in the parking lot of a Borders bookstore. Its first bout was played in December, 2006, an interleague contest between the Demolition Dolls and the Screw City Slammers, part of a four team inter-league squad that also included the Midwest Maulers and the Rollitas. The bout attracted 650 fans. In 2009, the league attracted attention for its abandonment of smoking breaks.

Rockford was accepted into the Women's Flat Track Derby Association Apprentice Program in September 2009, and became a full member of the WFTDA in June 2010.

The league returned to competition in August 2022 after the COVID-19 pandemic interrupted its schedule. It had cancelled a March 2020 bout and had not competed since late 2019; its return bout, against the Kentucky Black-n-Bluegrass, was held at the UW Health Sports Factory.

== Historical WFTDA rankings (2011–2016) ==
Season	Final ranking	Playoffs	Championship
2011	27 NC	DNQ	DNQ
2012	33 NC	DNQ	DNQ
2013	NR	DNQ	DNQ
2014	NR	DNQ	DNQ
2015	NR	DNQ	DNQ
2016	238 WFTDA	DNQ	DNQ

- NR = no final ranking assigned this year
