= Soul City Sirens =

Roller derby league in Augusta, Georgia, US

- Metro area: Augusta, GA
- Country: United States
- Founded: 2008
- Teams: All-Stars
- Track type: Flat
- Venue: Red Wing Rollerway
- Affiliations: WFTDA
- Website: soulcitysirens.com

Soul City Sirens (SCS) is a women's flat track roller derby league based in Augusta, Georgia. Founded in 2008, the league consists of a single team, which competes against teams from other leagues. Soul City is a member of the Women's Flat Track Derby Association (WFTDA).

== History ==
The league was founded in January 2008 by Jessica Thompson, a local librarian, and played its first bout in January 2009. By 2013, it was averaging 350 fans at each bout, and had developed a particular rivalry with the Richland County Regulators.

Soul City was accepted into the Women's Flat Track Derby Association Apprentice Program in July 2011, and in March 2013, it became a full member of the WFTDA.

Since 2013, Soul City has hosted the annual Low Down Throw Down WFTDA-recognized tournament, drawing teams from across the southeastern United States.

== WFTDA rankings ==
Season	Final ranking	Playoffs	Championship
2013	174 WFTDA	DNQ	DNQ
2014	209 WFTDA	DNQ	DNQ
2015	241 WFTDA	DNQ	DNQ
2016	310 WFTDA	DNQ	DNQ
