= Renegade Derby Dames =

Roller derby league

- Metro area: Alliston, ON
- Country: Canada
- Founded: 2011
- Teams: Striking Vikings (A team); Bombshell Battalion (B team)
- Track type: Flat
- Venue: Alliston Memorial Arena
- Affiliations: WFTDA, RDAC
- Website: www.renegadederbydames.com

Renegade Derby Dames (RDD) is a women's flat track roller derby league based in Alliston, Ontario. Founded in 2011, the league consists of two teams, which compete against teams from other leagues. Renegade is a member of the Women's Flat Track Derby Association (WFTDA).

== History ==
The league was founded in April 2011 by a group of existing skaters from other teams in the region. It played its first bout in November, taking on Durham Region Roller Derby.

Striking Vikings team logo

Bombshell Battalion team logo

In January 2013, Renegade Derby Dames were accepted as a member of the Women's Flat Track Derby Association Apprentice Program. The league played a more intensive schedule during 2013, bouting three weeks in a row during July. On March 11, 2014, Renegade was made a full member of the WFTDA.

The league comprises two teams, the A-level team being the Striking Vikings and the B team the Bombshell Battalion.

== WFTDA rankings ==
Season	Final ranking	Playoffs	Championship
2014	213 WFTDA	DNQ	DNQ
2015	270 WFTDA	DNQ	DNQ
2016	204 WFTDA	DNQ	DNQ
2017	250 WFTDA	DNQ	DNQ
2018	248 WFTDA	DNQ	DNQ
2019	299 WFTDA	DNQ	DNQ
2020	294 WFTDA	DNQ	DNQ
2023	107 NA Northeast	NPS	NPS
2024	104 NA Northeast	DNQ	DNQ

- no final rankings 2020-2022 due to COVID-19 pandemic
- NPS = no postseason
