= Silicon Valley Roller Derby =

Roller derby league

- Metro area: San Jose, California
- Country: United States
- Founded: 2007
- Dissolved: 2024
- Teams: Dot.Kamikazes (A team); KillaBytes (B team); Hard Drivers (C team)
- Track type: Flat
- Venue: The Plex, San Jose, CA
- Affiliations: WFTDA
- Org. type: 501(c)3
- Website: www.siliconvalleyrollerderby.com

The Silicon Valley Roller Derby (SVRD) roller derby league was based in San Jose, California. Founded in 2007, the league consisted of three teams which compete against teams from other leagues. Silicon Valley is a member of the Women's Flat Track Derby Association (WFTDA).

== History ==
Founded in 2007 as the Silicon Valley Roller Girls, the league played its first bout in August 2008, against the Port City Roller Girls. SVRG was accepted into the Women's Flat Track Derby Association Apprentice Program in September 2009, and became a full member of the WFTDA in June 2010.

One former Silicon Valley skater, Brazilian Bombshell, competed for Roller Derby Brasil at the 2011 Roller Derby World Cup.

The league also supports a junior roller derby program and a recreational league.

The league changed its name from Silicon Valley Roller Girls to Silicon Valley Roller Derby to promote inclusion, opening the team up to be gender expansive.

The team dissolved in late 2024.

== WFTDA rankings ==
Season	Final ranking	Playoffs	Championship
2011	14 W	DNQ	DNQ
2012	9 W	DNQ	DNQ
2013	63 WFTDA	DNQ	DNQ
2014	110 WFTDA	DNQ	DNQ
2015	225 WFTDA	DNQ	DNQ
2016	213 WFTDA	DNQ	DNQ
2017	122 WFTDA	DNQ	DNQ
2018	218 WFTDA	DNQ	DNQ
