= ICT Roller Derby =

Roller derby league

- Metro area: Wichita, KS
- Country: United States
- Founded: 2006
- Teams: ICT Roller Derby All Stars (A team); ICT Roller Derby Havoc (B team)
- Track type(s): Flat
- Venue: The Cotillion
- Affiliations: WFTDA
- Website: ictrollerderby.com

ICT Roller Derby (ICTRD) is a women's flat track roller derby league based in Wichita, Kansas. Founded in 2006, ICT was the first roller derby team in Kansas. ICT is a member of the Women's Flat Track Derby Association (WFTDA).

== History and organization ==
ICT was founded as "ICT Roller Girls" in 2006, and celebrated its tenth anniversary in 2016. By 2008, the league had more than forty skaters.

ICT was accepted into the Women's Flat Track Derby Association Apprentice program in October 2009, and became a full member in June 2010, the first league from Kansas to be accepted. In 2016, ICT served as the host league for one of that year's WFTDA Division 2 Playoffs at the Wichita Sports Forum.

Ahead of the 2017 season, the league rebranded as ICT Roller Derby.

== WFTDA rankings ==
Season	Final ranking	Playoffs	Championship
2011	23 SC	DNQ	DNQ
2012	23 SC	DNQ	DNQ
2013	107 WFTDA	DNQ	DNQ
2014	184 WFTDA	DNQ	DNQ
2015	114 WFTDA	DNQ	DNQ
2016	124 WFTDA	DNQ	DNQ
2017	132 WFTDA	DNQ	DNQ
2018	242 WFTDA	DNQ	DNQ
