= Lafayette Roller Derby =

Roller derby league

- Metro area: Lafayette, IN
- Country: United States
- Founded: 2008
- Track type(s): Flat
- Venue: Tippecanoe County Fairgrounds
- Affiliations: WFTDA
- Website: lafayetterollerderby.com

Lafayette Roller Derby is a women's flat track roller derby league based in Lafayette, Indiana. Founded in 2008, the league consists of a single team which competes against teams from other leagues. Lafayette is a member of the Women's Flat Track Derby Association (WFTDA).

== History ==
The league was accepted into the Women's Flat Track Derby Association Apprentice Program in July 2010. Lafayette became a full WFTDA member in December 2013.

By early 2012, the league had 31 skaters, of whom 14 were mothers, and its bouts were attracting hundreds of spectators. The expansion of league membership enabled the formation of distinct A and B squads.

== WFTDA rankings ==
Season	Final ranking	Playoffs	Championship
2014	220 WFTDA	DNQ	DNQ
2015	NR WFTDA	DNQ	DNQ
2016	NR WFTDA	DNQ	DNQ
