= Fairbanks Rollergirls =

Roller derby league

- Metro area: Fairbanks, Alaska
- Country: United States
- Founded: 2008
- Teams: FBXRG All Stars
- Track type(s): Flat
- Venue: Lathrop High School
- Affiliations: WFTDA
- Website: fairbanksrollergirls.org

Fairbanks Rollergirls (FBXRG) is a women's flat track roller derby league, located in Fairbanks, Alaska. Founded in 2008, FBXRG is a member of the Women's Flat Track Derby Association (WFTDA).

== History and organization ==
Founded in 2008 by local entrepreneur Michelle Maynor (also known as "Bad Lady") the early members were a handful of motivated, strong-willed women with a passion for roller derby. Maynor was quickly elected president of the organization and held the position until her term ended in July 2011.

In April 2010 FBXRG was accepted as an Apprentice Member of the Women's Flat Track Derby Association (WFTDA). In June 2011 the Fairbanks Rollergirls were accepted as full WFTDA members, as a part of the West region.

Fairbanks Rollergirls is a skater-owned, skater-operated organization. None of its members receive any revenue from the league, which is run as a 501(c)(4) non-profit organization.

=== WFTDA rankings ===
Season	Final ranking	Playoffs	Championship
2012	37 W	DNQ	DNQ
2013	171 WFTDA	DNQ	DNQ
2014	NR WFTDA	DNQ	DNQ
2015	NR WFTDA	DNQ	DNQ
2016	NR WFTDA	DNQ	DNQ
2017	312 WFTDA	DNQ	DNQ
2018	304 WFTDA	DNQ	DNQ

- NR = no end-of-year ranking assigned

== Teams ==
Gold Diggers logo

Raven Rebels logo

At the end of their first season, the Fairbanks Rollergirls introduced two new intraleague teams, the Gold Diggers and the Raven Rebels. This marked a milestone in the Fairbanks Rollergirls history as it meant the league had grown large enough to house two home teams of 14-20 rostered skaters each. The home teams were dissolved in 2015, leaving the league with its single travel team. Fairbanks Rollergirls' All Star Team, the Fairbanks Rollergirls All Stars were founded in 2010 and a B-team, the Fairbanks Rollergirls Roller Borealis founded in 2011.

== Exposure ==
In 2009, the Fairbanks Rollergirls were approached by the makers of Prilosec OTC, to take part in a national advertisement campaign for the drug in a marketing campaign titled "Project Fairbanks," which offered a brief look into the lives of a diverse group of Fairbanksans with heartburn. A television commercial was produced featuring Fairbanks Rollergirls' skater Jump on Jen, along with a number of other skaters in the league. The production company hosted and filmed the December 2009 Home for the Holidays bout, the free public admission to which was provided courtesy of Prilosec OTC. As a way of saying thanks to Fairbanks, $10,000 was pledged to the United Way of the Tanana Valley.

In late 2010, Fairbanks Rollergirls skater and founder, Bad Lady, was interviewed in Episode 20 of the Derby Radio podcast to discuss derby in Alaska and their upcoming bout with the Pacific Roller Derby All Stars team.

The Fairbanks Rollergirls have been featured in a number of local media outlets including local news and radio, newspaper articles, and television appearances.
