= Quad City Rollers =

Roller derby league

- Metro area: Davenport, IA
- Country: United States
- Founded: 2006
- Teams: All-Stars (A team); Mississippi Massacre (B team); Orphan Brigade (Juniors)
- Track type: Flat
- Venue: Eldridge Community Center and Skatepark
- Affiliations: WFTDA
- Website: www.quadcityrollers.com

Quad City Rollers (QCR) is a roller derby league based in Davenport, Iowa. Founded in 2006, the league currently consists of two adult teams, the All-Stars and the Mississippi Massacre, and a junior roller derby team, the Orphan Brigade. Quad City is a member of the Women's Flat Track Derby Association (WFTDA).

== History and organization ==
The Quad City Rollers entered the WFTDA Apprentice Program in July 2011 and became a full member of the WFTDA in December 2013. The Quad City Rollers operate as a not-for-profit 501(c)3 organization and are skater-owned and -operated.

== WFTDA rankings ==
Season	Final ranking	Playoffs	Championship
2014	97 WFTDA	DNQ	DNQ
2015	222 WFTDA	DNQ	DNQ
2016	194 WFTDA	DNQ	DNQ
2017	279 WFTDA	DNQ	DNQ
2018	275 WFTDA	DNQ	DNQ
