= McLean County MissFits =

Roller derby league

- Metro area: Bloomington, IL
- Country: United States
- Founded: 2010 by Janice Kunkel
- Dissolved: 2015?
- Teams: All Stars (A team); Wanna-B's (B team); AlphaBetties; Cupquakes pTERRORdactyls
- Track type(s): Flat
- Venue: The Interstate Center
- Affiliations: WFTDA
- Website: mcmderby.wixsite.com/mcm-new

McLean County MissFits (MCM) was a women's flat track roller derby league based in Bloomington, Illinois. Founded in 2010, the league consisted of a three home teams, plus two travel teams, the All-Stars and the Wanna-B's, who compete against teams from other leagues. McLean County was a member of the Women's Flat Track Derby Association (WFTDA).

== History ==
Founded in April 2010, the league was bouting by December, when it played the Soy City Rollers in that league's debut game. In April 2011, it hosted its first home bout.

The league was accepted into the Women's Flat Track Derby Association Apprentice Program in July 2011, and it graduated to full membership in December 2012. As of December 2017, McLean County is no longer listed as a current member on the WFTDA website, and last received a ranking in the May 31, 2015 release, at 217th overall.

== WFTDA rankings ==
Season	Final ranking	Playoffs	Championship
2013	161 WFTDA	DNQ	DNQ
2014	205 WFTDA	DNQ	DNQ
