= Chattanooga Roller Derby =

US women's flat track roller derby league

- Metro area: Chattanooga, Tennessee
- Country: United States
- Founded: 2008
- Track type: Flat
- Venue: Chattanooga Convention Center
- Affiliations: WFTDA
- Website: chattanoogarollerderby.com

Chattanooga Roller Derby (CRD) is a women's flat track roller derby league based in Chattanooga, Tennessee. Founded in 2008, the league consists of a single travel team, which competes against teams from other leagues, and is a member of the Women's Flat Track Derby Association (WFTDA).

== League history ==
The league was formed in August 2008 as Chattanooga Roller Girls, by about thirty women. It played its first bout in December 2009 and, by mid-2011, was attracting crowds of more than 1,000 people.

Chattanooga was accepted into the WFTDA Apprentice Program in April 2010, and became a full member of the WFTDA in September 2012.

In 2020, the league changed its name to Chattanooga Roller Derby.

== WFTDA rankings ==
Season	Final ranking	Playoffs	Championship
2012	32 SC	DNQ	DNQ
2013	134 WFTDA	DNQ	DNQ
2014	156 WFTDA	DNQ	DNQ
2015	156 WFTDA	DNQ	DNQ
2016	179 WFTDA	DNQ	DNQ
