= CoMo Derby Dames =

US roller derby league

- Metro area: Columbia, MO
- Country: United States
- Founded: 2007
- Teams: Derby Dames (A team); Astronaughties; Brass Knuckle Betties
- Track type(s): Flat
- Venue: Father Tolton Catholic High School
- Affiliations: WFTDA
- Website: www.comoderbydames.org

The CoMo Derby Dames (CMDD) is a women's flat track roller derby league based in Columbia, Missouri. Founded in 2007, the league currently consists of two teams, and a mixed travel team which competes against teams from other leagues. CoMo is a member of the Women's Flat Track Derby Association (WFTDA).

== History ==
The league was founded in January 2007 as the Destruction Junction Derby Dames by Adriene Weller, known as "Bitchy Valens", Jessie Lewis, known as "Foxy Four-Stroke", and Sara Wolff, known as "Roxy Horror." Its first bout, an intraleague contest, was held in July, by which time the league already had more than fifty skaters.

The league subsequently adopted its current name, and was accepted into the Women's Flat Track Derby Association Apprentice Program in July 2010, and became a full member of the WFTDA in March 2012.

In 2018 the league changed its name to COMO Roller Derby in order to be more inclusive.

== WFTDA rankings ==
Season	Final ranking	Playoffs	Championship
2012	30 NC	DNQ	DNQ
2013	140 WFTDA	DNQ	DNQ
2014	186 WFTDA	DNQ	DNQ
2015	197 WFTDA	DNQ	DNQ
2016	189 WFTDA	DNQ	DNQ
