= Hub City Derby Dames =

Roller derby league

- Metro area: Hattiesburg, MS
- Country: United States
- Founded: 2008
- Teams: Southern Misfits (A team); Hattiesburg Hooligans (B team)
- Track type(s): Flat
- Venue: Lake Terrace Convention Center
- Website: www.hubcityderbydames.com

The Hub City Derby Dames (HCDD) was a women's flat track roller derby league based in Hattiesburg, Mississippi. Founded in 2008, the league consisted of two teams, which compete against teams from other leagues.

The league was founded early in 2008 by Courtney Germany and Jennifer Devereaux, and was initially known as the Hattiesburg Southern Misfits, that name later being adopted for its travel team. Hub City helped other local leagues train and get established, such as the Tri-City Derby Dolls.

Hub City was accepted into the Women's Flat Track Derby Association Apprentice Programme in July 2010, and in March 2013, it became a full member of the WFTDA.

Hub City last appeared in the Women's Flat Track Derby Association Rankings with the March 31, 2015 release, at which time they were ranked last in the WFTDA at 238th. Hub City is no longer listed as member league by the WFTDA, and the league website is no longer active.

== WFTDA rankings ==
Season	Final ranking	Playoffs	Championship
2013	159 WFTDA	N/A	N/A
2014	225 WFTDA	N/A	N/A
