= Derby Revolution of Bakersfield =

Roller derby league

- Metro area: Bakersfield, CA
- Country: United States
- Founded: 2008
- Teams: All Stars (A team)
- Track type: Flat
- Venue: Saunders Park
- Affiliations: WFTDA
- Website: myderbyrevolution.com

Derby Revolution of Bakersfield (DRB) was a women's flat track roller derby league based in Bakersfield, California. Founded in 2008, DRB consisted of a single travel team which competes against teams from other leagues, and was a member of the Women's Flat Track Derby Association (WFTDA).

In 2016, they had a 20 member charter, with five players having under two years of experience. In 2019, they disbanded.

== History ==
Derby Revolution of Bakersfield was founded in 2008 by Tonya "Tonka Toy" Warren, who was inspired by watching Rollergirls on television. Derby Revolution of Bakersfield was accepted into the Women's Flat Track Derby Association Apprentice program in December 2009, and graduated to full WFTDA membership at the end of 2010.

== WFTDA rankings ==
Season	Final ranking	Playoffs	Championship
2014	182 WFTDA	DNQ	DNQ
2015	199 WFTDA	DNQ	DNQ
2016	233 WFTDA	DNQ	DNQ
