= Slaughterhouse Derby Girls =

Roller derby league

- Metro area: Greeley, CO
- Country: United States
- Founded: 2007
- Teams: Prime Cuts (A team); Bone Saw Bruisers (B team); Butcher Babes; June's Cleavers; Porterhouse Dollz
- Track type: Flat
- Venue: The Kill Floor
- Affiliations: WFTDA
- Website: www.slaughterhousederbygirls.com

Slaughterhouse Derby Girls is a women's flat track roller derby league based in Greeley, Colorado. Founded in 2007, the league consisted of three home teams, and two mixed teams which compete against teams from other leagues. Slaughterhouse was a member of the Women's Flat Track Derby Association (WFTDA). The league shut down in 2020 due to Covid 19 restrictions and the subsequent loss of funding.

== History ==
The league was founded in November 2007 by "RollaRella", who had previously skated with FoCo Girls Gone Derby, and played its first bout in May 2008. In October, it opened its own rink, known as "The Kill Floor", and described by the Fort Collins Coloradoan as having a "chilling underground ambiance".

Slaughterhouse was accepted as a member of the Women's Flat Track Derby Association early in 2009. Every year from 2011 to 2020, the league hosted the Mayday Mayhem invitational tournament.

== WFTDA rankings ==
Former Slaughterhouse logo

Season	Final ranking	Playoffs	Championship
2011	29 W	DNQ	DNQ
2012	28 W	DNQ	DNQ
2013	146 WFTDA	DNQ	DNQ
2014	146 WFTDA	DNQ	DNQ
2015	266 WFTDA	DNQ	DNQ
2016	283 WFTDA	DNQ	DNQ
