= Port Scandalous Roller Derby =

Roller derby league

- Metro area: Port Angeles, WA
- Country: United States
- Founded: 2010
- Teams: Intense City Rollers (A team); Strait Shooters; Roller Punks (junior)
- Track type: Flat
- Venue: Boys and Girls Club - Sequim
- Affiliations: WFTDA
- Website: www.portscandalousrollerderby.com

Port Scandalous Roller Derby is a women's flat track roller derby league based in Port Angeles, Washington. The league is primarily skater-run, and consists of three teams: a home team, Strait Shooters; a traveling team, Intense City; and a junior team, Roller Punks. Teams compete against other teams from leagues across Western Washington. The traveling and junior teams are currently inactive. Port Scandalous is a member of the Women's Flat Track Derby Association (WFTDA).

== History ==
The league was founded in May 2010 by local women including Jessica Carvell, Serena Staples and Holly Botts. Initially known as the "Port Scandalous Derby Dolls", it changed its name due to trademark issues. Skaters from other local leagues helped train the new team, and by late 2011, it was bouting monthly, and was setting up a B team and junior roller derby league. League membership has declined in recent years and is currently rebuilding.

Port Scandalous was accepted as a member of the Women's Flat Track Derby Association Apprentice Program in October 2012, and it became a full WFTDA member in September 2013.

Port Scandalous is a non-profit organization.

== WFTDA rankings ==
Season	Final ranking	Playoffs	Championship
2014	100 WFTDA	DNQ	DNQ
