= Pikes Peak Derby Dames =

Roller derby league

- Metro area: Colorado Springs, Colorado
- Country: United States
- Founded: 2005
- Teams: All-Stars (A team); Slamazons (B team); Candy Snipers; Danger Dolls; Killer Queens
- Track type: Flat
- Venue: Colorado Springs City Auditorium
- Affiliations: WFTDA
- Org. type: NPO
- Website: pikespeakderbydames.com

Pikes Peak Derby Dames is a women's flat track roller derby league based in Colorado Springs, Colorado. Founded in 2005, Pike's Peak is a founding member of the Women's Flat Track Derby Association (WFTDA).

== League history and organization ==
Pikes Peak Derby Dames was founded in the summer of 2005, when Courtney "Slugs-N-Kisses" Mansfield was inspired after reading about the Texas Rollergirls. With guidance from Denver's Rocky Mountain Rollergirls, Pike's Peak began training at Skate City that same year. The league is run by its members, and is a nonprofit organization.

Pikes Peaks consists of three home teams that primarily play each other, and two travel teams. The home teams are the Candy Snipers, Danger Dolls, Killer Queens. The Pikes Peak travel teams, the All Stars and the Slamazons, play teams from other leagues. The All Stars are ranked internationally by the WFTDA, and their games factor into their ranking. The Slamazons are the B team, and typically play other B teams in non-sanctioned play.

== WFTDA competition ==
original league logo

Pikes Peak first competed at the WFTDA Western Regional Tournament in 2007, losing their opening round game to B.ay A.rea D.erby Girls 198–11. At the 2008 Western Regional, Pikes Peak dropped their opening game to Duke City Derby 138–99, and after victories over Houston Roller Derby and Tucson Roller Derby, lost 159–71 to Kansas City Roller Warriors to finish the tournament in sixth place. In 2009, Pikes Peak finished a winless weekend at the Western Regional with a 185–91 loss to Tucson to finish in tenth place.

After a five-year absence from WFTDA Playoffs, in 2015 Pikes Peak clawed all the way back from a pre-season ranking of 93 into the 30s, to qualify for Division 1 Playoffs in Jacksonville as the ninth seed. At Jacksonville, losses to Steel City, Detroit and Glasgow left Pikes Peak with a tenth-place finish. Pikes Peak dropped in the rankings in 2016 and did not qualify for Playoffs in that year.

== WFTDA rankings ==
Season	Final ranking	Playoffs	Championship
2006	24 WFTDA	—	N/A
2007	28 WFTDA	R1 W	DNQ
2008	3 W	6 W	DNQ
2009	10 W	10 W	DNQ
2010	10 W	DNQ	DNQ
2011	18 W	DNQ	DNQ
2012	14 W	DNQ	DNQ
2013	96 WFTDA	DNQ	DNQ
2014	94 WFTDA	DNQ	DNQ
2015	38 WFTDA	10 D1	DNQ
2016	127 WFTDA	DNQ	DNQ
2017	102 WFTDA	DNQ	DNQ

- no WFTDA rankings from 2020-2022 due to COVID-19 pandemic

== In the community ==
The Pikes Peak Derby Dames are active in the community, donating time, money, and event tickets to charities and nonprofit organizations in the Pikes Peak region. Members of Pikes Peak were featured on a 2007 episode of Trading Spaces.
