= Lava City Roller Derby =

Women's roller derby league based in Bend, Oregon

- Metro area: Bend, OR
- Country: United States
- Founded: 2006
- Teams: Smokin' Ashes (A team); Spit Fires (B team); Junior All-Stars (junior)
- Track type: Flat
- Venue: The Pavilion; Deschutes County Expo Center
- Affiliations: WFTDA
- Website: www.lavacityrollerderby.com

Lava City Roller Derby, formerly Lava City Roller Dolls, (LCRD) is a women's flat track roller derby league based in Bend, Oregon. Founded in 2006, the league currently consists of two mixed teams which compete against teams from other leagues, and an affiliated junior roller derby team for girls and boys aged 10-17. Lava City is a member of the Women's Flat Track Derby Association (WFTDA).

== History ==
The league was founded in February 2006 by Dusty Mink, known as Psy-clone, who had friends who skated for the Rose City Rollers, and Jamie Olsen, known as Suicide Jane. It was accepted as a member of the Women's Flat Track Derby Association (WFTDA) in 2008.

In 2010, LCRD started a junior roller derby league.

== WFTDA rankings ==
Season	Final ranking	Playoffs	Championship
2009	14 W	DNQ	DNQ
2010	19 W	DNQ	DNQ
2011	22 W	DNQ	DNQ
2012	33 W	DNQ	DNQ
2013	127 WFTDA	DNQ	DNQ
2014	130 WFTDA	DNQ	DNQ
2015	150 WFTDA	DNQ	DNQ
2016	175 WFTDA	DNQ	DNQ
2017	177 WFTDA	DNQ	DNQ
2018	197 WFTDA	DNQ	DNQ
2019	335 WFTDA	DNQ	DNQ
2023	NR	DNQ	DNQ
2024	69 NA West	DNQ	DNQ
