= Sick Town Roller Derby =

Roller derby league

- Metro area: Corvallis, OR
- Country: United States
- Founded: 2008
- Teams: S*M*A*S*H Unit
- Track type: Flat
- Venue: Linn County Fair & Expo Center (Albany)
- Affiliations: WFTDA
- Org. type: 501(c)3
- Website: sicktownrollerderby.com

Sick Town Roller Derby (STRD), founded as Sick Town Derby Dames, is a women's flat track roller derby league based in Corvallis, Oregon. Founded in 2008, the league consists of a single team which competes against teams from other leagues. Sick Town is a member of the Women's Flat Track Derby Association (WFTDA).

== History ==
The league was founded by Brick Wallace and Magic Hips, two skaters with the Emerald City Roller Girls who wanted a league closer to their home town. It played its first home bout in September 2009, against the Lava City Roller Dolls.

Sick Town accepted into the Women's Flat Track Derby Association Apprentice Program in December 2009. By early 2012, it had enough skaters to host an intraleague bout, and in June 2012 it was accepted as a full member of the WFTDA.

In 2013, the league purchased the Lake Park Roller Rink in Lewisburg, the third-oldest roller rink in the Pacific Northwest. Sick Town planned to use the building as a practice rink, but shortly afterwards the facility was declared unsafe by the local fire marshal, leading to lengthy and costly restoration efforts. Membership dropped off during a lengthy hiatus, and in October 2017 the league played its first home game in three years, at the Linn County Fair and Expo Grounds in Albany.

In September 2016, league member Miranda "Dixieskullpopper" Prince gained local news coverage for appearing on the game show Jeopardy!

In April 2021, the league sold the Lake Park Roller Rink building after repairs became too difficult to maintain. During this time, the league had paused practices due to the COVID-19 Pandemic and was not able to return to practicing in a limited form until the summer of 2021. Since the league was without a venue for a time, they practiced outdoors until they were able to make arrangements to skate in Langton Hall at Oregon State University.

In October 2021, Sick Town began practicing at the Mid-Willamette Family YMCA Family Activities Center. The league was able to rebuild again and had their first home game in May 2023, more than 3 years after their last one which was held just prior to the Pandemic.

In April 2023, Sick Town Derby Dames announced via the team's Facebook page that they would change their name to Sick Town Roller Derby (STRD) and adapted their logo to be more inclusive and better reflect their values that "All Can Skate Here".

== WFTDA rankings ==
Sick Town Roller Derby is ranked within WFTDA's NA West geographic division.

Season	Final ranking	Playoffs	Championship
2013	108 WFTDA	DNQ	DNQ
2014	194 WFTDA	DNQ	DNQ
2015	NR	DNQ	DNQ
2016	NR	DNQ	DNQ
2017	NR	DNQ	DNQ
2018	NR	DNQ	DNQ
2019	NR	DNQ	DNQ
2023	80 NA West	DNQ	DNQ
2024	NR	DNQ	DNQ

- NR = no final ranking assigned this year
- no WFTDA rankings from 2020-2022 due to COVID-19 pandemic
