= FoCo Roller Derby =

Roller derby league

- Metro area: Fort Collins, CO
- Country: United States
- Founded: 2006
- Teams: Micro Bruisers (A team); Brew Crew (B team); Ale Marys; The Growlers
- Track type: Flat
- Venue: McKee 4-H Community Center; Rollerland Skate Center
- Affiliations: WFTDA
- Org. type: 501(c)3 Nonprofit Organization
- Website: www.focorollerderby.org

FoCo Roller Derby, formerly FoCo Girls Gone Derby, is a women's flat track roller derby league based in Fort Collins, Colorado. Founded in 2006, the league currently consists of two teams, and two mixed teams which compete against teams from other leagues. FoCo is a member of the Women's Flat Track Derby Association (WFTDA).

== Teams ==
The league's two home teams have evolved over the years. Originally the Chanel Cartel and the Death Row Dolls, which later became the Cinder Hellas and Psycho Sirens in 2009, and finally the Ale Marys and The Growlers in 2019. The Micro Bruisers is the league's primary all-star team for inter-league competition and is composed of skaters from the two home teams. The Brew Crew, a second travel team for up-and-coming stars, also had an identity change from the Punchy Brewsters in 2018. New recruits are not referred to as "Fresh Meat" as in other roller derby leagues, but as "Fresh Hops" to fit in with the rest of the leagues' brewing theme.

== History ==
FoCo was founded in January 2006 and was accepted as a member of the Women's Flat Track Derby Association in January 2009. Several other leagues have origins in FoCo, including the Choice City Rebels, and the Slaughterhouse Derby Girls.

Since 2009, FoCo has held an annual "Black and Blue Ball", a formal event featuring an intraleague bout and an annual Salt N' Pepper bout which allows a mixed team of skaters and officials a change to switch roles and play or officiate.

At the start of FoCo's 10th season, the league rebranded from FoCo Girls Gone Derby to FoCo Roller Derby to represent inclusiveness, athleticism and the local community.

Mid-season 2018, FoCo Roller Derby lost their main events and practice venue, The Events Center, and are still in search of a new home in Northern Colorado.

== WFTDA rankings ==
Season	Final ranking	Playoffs	Championship
2010	22 W	DNQ	DNQ
2011	26 W	DNQ	DNQ
2012	29 W	DNQ	DNQ
2013	137 WFTDA	DNQ	DNQ
2014	185 WFTDA	DNQ	DNQ
2015	172 WFTDA	DNQ	DNQ
2016	207 WFTDA	DNQ	DNQ
2017	133 WFTDA	DNQ	DNQ
2018	115 WFTDA	DNQ	DNQ
