= Central Coast Roller Derby =

Roller derby league

- Metro area: San Luis Obispo
- Country: United States
- Founded: 2006
- Teams: SK805 (A team); Micro Bruisers (B team); Opposites Distract
- Track type: Flat
- Venue: Paso Robles Fairgrounds
- Affiliations: WFTDA
- Website: centralcoastrollerderby.com

Central Coast Roller Derby is a women's flat track roller derby league based in Paso Robles, California. Founded in 2006, Central Coast Roller Derby is a member of the Women's Flat Track Derby Association (WFTDA).

== History and organization ==
The league was founded by Carey Jones, who skates as "Cheeba", and Heather Coss, "Rotten Peaches", in January 2006. It quickly developed a dual focus, both on playing the sport, and on raising money for charity. In 2007, members of the league appeared in a music video for the Static-X single, "Destroyer".

The league affiliated with the Women's Flat Track Derby Association (WFTDA), but in 2010 a spokesperson noted that their short-term priorities were to move up in the rankings, rather than to qualify for the WFTDA Western Regional Tournament.

In 2012, Central Coast instituted three home teams to compete against each other the A-Town Asylum, the Broad St. Brawlers, and Paso Aggressive. The home teams were later disbanded.

== WFTDA rankings ==
Season	Final ranking	Playoffs	Championship
2010	17 W	DNQ	DNQ
2011	20 W	DNQ	DNQ
2012	27 W	DNQ	DNQ
2013	144 WFTDA	DNQ	DNQ
2014	189 WFTDA	DNQ	DNQ
2015	258 WFTDA	DNQ	DNQ
2016	232 WFTDA	DNQ	DNQ
2017	274 WFTDA	DNQ	DNQ
