= Orange County Roller Derby =

Roller derby league

- Metro area: Irvine, CA
- Country: United States
- Founded: 2006
- Teams: Huntington Heartbreakers (travel team); Orange Crushers
- Track type: Flat
- Venue: The Rinks, Irvine (flat)
- Affiliations: RDCL
- Website: www.ocderby.com

Orange County Roller Derby or OC Roller Derby (OCRD) is a roller derby league based in Irvine, California. Founded in 2006, the league currently consists of one travel team which competes against teams from other leagues, and one home team.

The league was founded in June 2006 by Heather Shelton, known as Disco Dervish. Early members included the Orange County District Attorney and, by April 2007, it had hosted three sold-out bouts. It joined the Women's Flat Track Derby Association (WFTDA) in January 2008, but became the first member to leave the organization, in March 2009.

In May 2011, OCRG began skating on a banked track, in addition to its flat track events. In June, it competed in the Battle on the Bank tournament. OCRG was a founding member of the Roller Derby Coalition of Leagues in January 2012.
