= Cheyenne Roller Derby =

American roller derby league

- Metro area: Cheyenne, WY
- Country: United States
- Founded: 2010
- Teams: Capidolls (A team); Fronterrors (B team)
- Track type(s): Flat
- Venue: Roller City
- Affiliations: WFTDA
- Website: cheyennerollerderby.net

Cheyenne Roller Derby is a women's flat track roller derby league based in Cheyenne, Wyoming. Founded in 2010, the league consists of two travel teams, which compete against teams from other leagues. Cheyenne is a member of the Women's Flat Track Derby Association (WFTDA).

The Capidolls remained undefeated for more than a year. The league attracted attention by raising money for the local animal shelter, and undertaking voluntary work, such as planting flowers in the city's downtown area.

The league was accepted into the Women's Flat Track Derby Association Apprentice Program in January 2012, and became a full member of the WFTDA in September 2012 - the first from Wyoming.

== WFTDA rankings ==
Season	Final ranking	Playoffs	Championship
2013	156 WFTDA	DNQ	DNQ
2014	138 WFTDA	DNQ	DNQ
2015	188 WFTDA	DNQ	DNQ
2016	95 WFTDA	DNQ	DNQ
2017	83 WFTDA	DNQ	DNQ
2018	NR WFTDA	DNQ	DNQ

- NR = no end-of-year ranking assigned
