= Salt City Derby Girls =

Roller derby league

Salt City Derby Girls Banked Track
- Metro area: Salt Lake City, Utah
- Country: United States
- Founded: 2005
- Dissolved: 2015
- Teams: Salt City Shakers (All Stars / Travel team); Bomber Babes; Death Dealers; Leave it to Cleavers; Sisters of No Mercy
- Track type(s): Banked
- Venue: Salt Palace
- Org. type: LLC
- Website: SLCDERBY.COM

The Salt City Derby Girls (SCDG) Banked Track league was based in Salt Lake City, Utah.

Formed in 2005, SCDG was composed of four local teams and one all-star traveling team.

In 2011, The Salt City Derby Girls changed their focus and became a Banked Track Roller Derby League. All home teams competed against each other on the Banked Track to claim the trophy and title as Season Champions. The Salt City Shakers competed nationally on both Banked Track and Flat Track.

The four teams wore distinct colors: The Bomber Babes wore camouflage and Olive drab, the Death Dealers wore Purple, the Leave it to Cleavers wore Red and White, often with cherry accents and the Sisters of No Mercy wore Black and Gold with nun habit accents. The All-star Travel team wore the league colors of Black and Yellow. They practiced at the Taylorsville Recreation Center in the Salt Lake City suburb of Taylorsville, Utah, and held local bouts at the Salt Palace in downtown Salt Lake City.

As of 2015, the Salt City Derby Girls are no longer an active league and are considered defunct.

== Local teams ==
- Bomber Babes
- Death Dealers
- Leave it to Cleavers
- Sisters of No Mercy

In the league's first full season, 2007, the Bomber Babes were undefeated and became league champions.

In the 2008 season, the Bomber Babes were again undefeated until the season championships, when they lost to the Leave It To Cleavers.

The 2009 Championships saw the Leave it to Cleavers against the Sister of No Mercy were the Cleavers kept their title for a second consecutive season.

The Death Dealers saw their first Championship game against the Leave it Cleavers and ended the winning streak for the Cleaver. 2010 Season Champions, Death Dealers.

== All-star teams ==
- Salt City Shakers

As of November 2008, the Salt City Derby Girls ranked 39th of the 46 member leagues ranked by the WFTDA. They had played the Rocky Mountain Roller Girls, Pike's Peak Derby Dames, Treasure Valley Roller Girls, Reno Battle Born Derby Demons, Duke City Derby Girls, the Fabulous Sin City Rollergirls, and the Sacred City Derby Girls.
