= Alamo City Rollergirls =

Women's flat-track roller derby league

Alamo City Roller Derby
- Metro area: San Antonio, Texas
- Country: United States
- Founded: 2005; 21 years ago
- Teams: Las Tejanas (A team); Las Pistoleras - (B team); Bradley Bombshells; Las Luchadoras
- Track type: Flat
- Venue: Mission Concepcion Sports Park
- Affiliations: WFTDA
- Org. type: LLC
- Website: acrollerderby.com

Alamo City Roller Derby (ACRD) (formerly known as Alamo City Rollergirls) is a women's flat-track roller derby league based in San Antonio, Texas. Founded in 2005, the league plays their 20th season in 2025. The ACRD are a founding member of the Women's Flat Track Derby Association (WFTDA).

== Teams ==
As of 2016, Alamo City has 3 home teams in the league, the Bradley Bombshells, Las Luchadoras, and Las Estrellas. Alamo City operates a training program called "Asphalt Assault", a twelve-week program that gets neophyte skaters up to speed.

=== WFTDA competition ===
ACRD league has two travel teams: Las Tejanas (WFTDA A-Team), Las Pistoleras (B-team).

=== Rankings ===
Season	Final Ranking	Playoffs	Championship
2006	29	—	N/A
2007	31	DNQ	DNQ
2008	10 SC	DNQ	DNQ
2009	19 SC	DNQ	DNQ
2010	19 SC	DNQ	DNQ
2011	22 SC	DNQ	DNQ
2012	20 SC	DNQ	DNQ
2013	120 WFTDA	DNQ	DNQ
2014	111 WFTDA	DNQ	DNQ
2015	202 WFTDA	DNQ	DNQ
2016	180 WFTDA	DNQ	DNQ
2017	287 WFTDA	DNQ	DNQ
2018	258 WFTDA	DNQ	DNQ
2019	230 WFTDA	DNQ	DNQ
2023	43 NA South	DNQ	DNQ
2024	51 NA South	DNQ	DNQ
