= Women's Flat Track Derby Association Rankings =

Rankings for the Women's Flat Track Derby Association (WFTDA) are used to determine placement in overall standings (rather than win–loss record) and also to determine seedings at WFTDA Playoffs. Achieving high rankings is also a goal for teams aiming to increase their stature in the organization. Each year at the end of June, teams are seeded into Division 1 and Division 2 playoff tournaments. Historically, the top 40 teams in the WFTDA as of June 30 were eligible for Division 1 tournaments that season, and the teams ranked 41–60 were eligible for Division 2 tournaments. For 2017, the Division 1 cutoff was reduced to the top 36 teams, with the next 16 teams qualifying for Division 2 Playoffs. The 2017 WFTDA Championships winner, Victorian Roller Derby League from Melbourne, Australia, became the first non-American team to achieve the top rankings slot in WFTDA history.

Ranking scores are calculated by averaging the number of game points a team earns in the last twelve months by the number of games played in the same time period. Game points are calculated using the following formula

$$\text{Total Game Points earned} = \text{Win/Loss Factor} \times \text{Opponent Strength} \times 100$$

where the Win/Loss Factor is three (the base value of a game) multiplied by percentage of points earned in the game and Opponent Strength is based on how far from the WFTDA-wide median score the opponent's score is. Minimum Opponent Strength for all teams is set to 0.5.
