= Angel City Derby =

Roller derby league

- Metro area: Los Angeles, CA
- Country: United States
- Founded: 2006
- Teams: Hollywood Scarlets (A team); Rocket Queens; Shore Shots; Road Ragers; Rising Stars
- Track type: Flat
- Venue: New venue TBA Summer 2025
- Affiliations: WFTDA
- Org. type: 501(c)3 NPO
- Website: www.angelcityderby.com

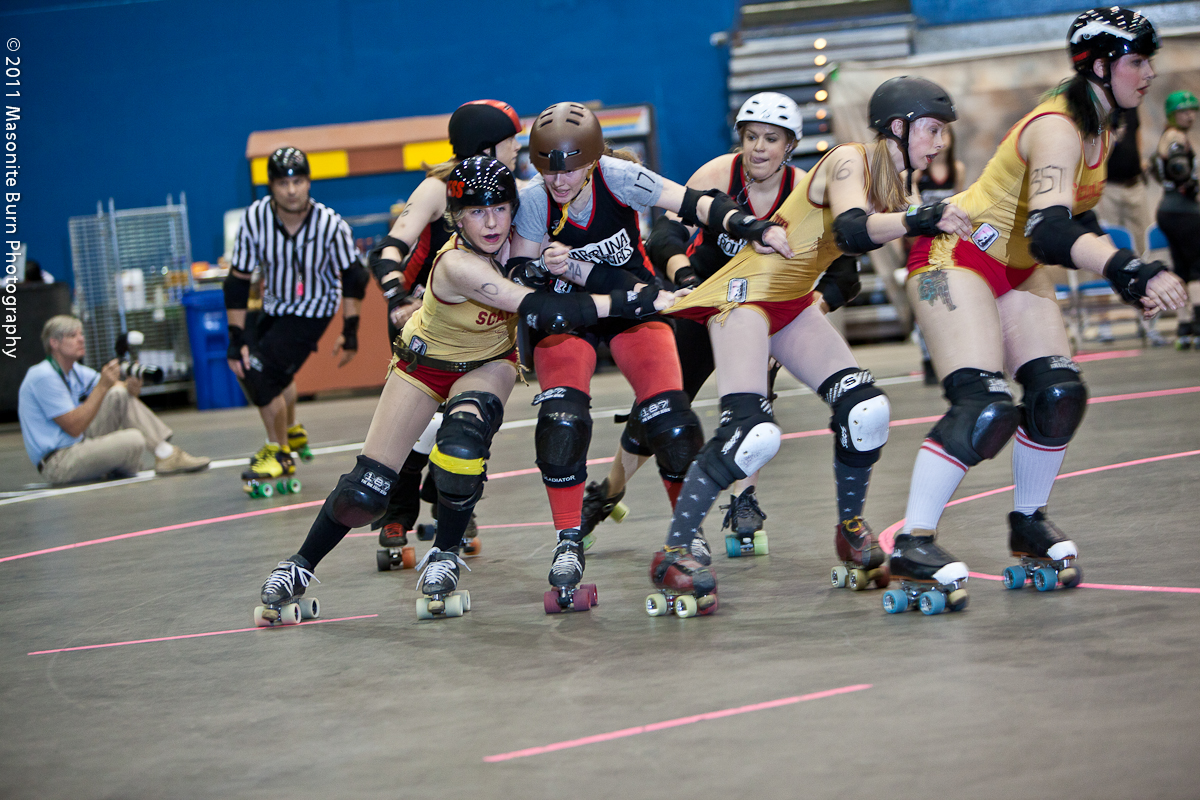
Angel City (in gold) take on the Carolina Rollergirls at the 2011 Dust Devil tournament

Angel City Derby is a women's flat track roller derby league based in Los Angeles, California. Founded in 2006 by a collective of skaters, the league is composed of nearly 200 members divided into four teams who skate on a flat track and compete against teams from the state of California and internationally. The league is skater-owned and operated, "by the skater, for the skater," a volunteer-fueled effort by members and alumni of the organization.

Angel City is a member of the Women's Flat Track Derby Association (WFTDA), the global governing body for Flat Track Roller Derby. Since 2013, Angel City's top-tier team, the Hollywood Scarlets, has been one of the top teams in the world as ranked by WFTDA. As of 2023, Angel City's program includes two other teams ranked in the Western US Region, the Rocket Queens and Shore Shots.

== Teams ==
The league currently consists of four adult teams (age 18+): the Hollywood Scarlets (WFTDA internationally competitive charter team), the Rocket Queens (internationally competitive B team), the Shore Shots (western region travel team) and the Road Ragers (local travel team), who compete against teams from other roller derby leagues. Members training to be placed on any of the four teams participate with the Rising Stars and Fresh Meat programs, or may join the league's popular fitness program, Angel City Fit Club.

In 2015, Angel City introduced Angel City Junior Derby (ACJD), a junior roller derby program for girls ages 7–17. ACJD featured two teams, the A-Listers and Blockbusters. The juniors program was not revived after the league returned to play in 2022, after a 2 year hiatus due to the COVID-19 pandemic.

Angel City Derby is also home to a number of certified skating officials and non-skating officials (NSOs). The crew is called Parks & REFreation.

== Team history ==
Angel City was the second roller derby league in Los Angeles, after the Los Angeles Derby Dolls, and the first to play on a flat track. Angel City played their first game on June 30, 2006 at World on Wheels in Los Angeles, and played its first full competitive season in 2007, based in a warehouse named "Heaven's Gate." Angel City initially had 3 home teams: the Berzerkers, Shore Shots and Block Steady Crew, and a travel team called the Road Ragers competing against other WFTDA travel teams. The home teams were dissolved after the 2008 season and changed to structure consisting of an A and B level travel team (the Hollywood Scarlets and The Rocket Queens, respectively).

In 2010 and 2011, the league saw a growth in membership and began to build out the program to include a sub pool of Rising Stars. The continued growth lead to the addition of a C level team to the A-B structure, and the new team was called the Road Ragers (in homage to the original name of the travel team that would eventually become the Hollywood Scarlets). In early 2011, the league moved its training into a warehouse in South Central Los Angeles, nicknamed "the Ascot." The securing of a consistent training space allowed for even more league growth, and by the end of 2012, the league moved into a larger, nicer warehouse facility in Gardena called Angel City Headquarters (or "HQ"), where they trained for 10 years.

In 2014, yet another team was added to the structure, the Shore Shots (in homage to the disbanded home team), competing at the same skill level as the Rocket Queens. The teams are no longer denoted by an A-B-C level, and instead by the level of competition they face: International (Hollywood Scarlets), Regional and Local.

In 2016, the league announced that the growth of regional level play of the Rocket Queens and Shore Shots had grown so competitive that a single tryout would be held for the top skaters to qualify to travel as the International Travel B team alongside the Hollywood Scarlets. The Hollywood Scarlets and newly restructured Rocket Queens traveled to the Big O Tournament in Eugene, OR and to the Rose City Rollers' Hometown Throwdown tournament in Spring 2016. The Shore Shots remain regionally competitive in the West, and the Road Ragers will remain locally competitive in the Los Angeles/Southern California area. This structure has continued and expanded in 2023 with the addition of regional rankings.

== WFTDA competition ==
Angel City was one of the first leagues in Southern California to become a member of the Women's Flat Track Derby Association (WFTDA), joining in December 2007. The Hollywood Scarlets represent Angel City at the WFTDA competitive level and play for international rankings in the organization. The Scarlets qualified as the 10th seed for the WFTDA West Region Playoffs in 2009, taking 8th place. They next qualified in 2011, again as 10th seed and finished in 9th place overall. In 2012, they qualified for the West Region Playoffs as the 8th seed and ended the tournament in the same position.

In 2013, the Scarlets rose significantly in the rankings, paralleled with the WFTDA's shift from a regional structure to a division-based structure. The Scarlets qualified for the 2013 WFTDA Playoffs ranked #5 overall. With the withdrawal of the Oly Rollers from the Playoffs, they entered the Women's Flat Track Derby Association Division 1 Playoffs in Richmond, Virginia, as the top seed. They finished in 3rd place, thus qualifying for the 2013 WFTDA Championships in Milwaukee, Wisconsin, for the first time in the history of the Angel City Derby Girls. The Scarlets matched up against Rocky Mountain Rollergirls in the first round at Championships and after defeating them 298–228, moved on to play the Denver Roller Dolls, but lost in the second round of the bracket and were knocked out of the single-elimination style tournament.

In 2014, the Scarlets, ranked #7 overall, entered the Division 1 Playoffs in Salt Lake City as a #2 seed and left at the same position, qualifying them for the Championship Tournament in Nashville, Tennessee. They faced the 2013 Championship runners-up, the Texas Rollergirls in the first round of the tournament. This was the first time Angel City played against the heralded "godmothers of roller derby" and Texas was victorious.

In 2015, the Scarlets entered the competitive play season with their most aggressive games to date. They defeated Santa Cruz Derby Girls, Arizona Roller Derby, Tampa Roller Derby, Atlanta Rollergirls, and Jacksonville RollerGirls in the Spring, and moving into summer bested Rocky Mountain, Minnesota RollerGirls and long-time rivals at B.ay A.rea D.erby Girls, but fell to Texas and London Rollergirls. They entered the 2015 Playoff cycle at #8 overall, placing them in Omaha in the #2 seed position where they again faced Minnesota for the chance to take on the perennial champions in the final game, Gotham Girls Roller Derby. Though Angel City lost, they did score more points against Gotham than any team had during the course of the season, and qualified for the Championship in Saint Paul, Minnesota. At the 2015 Championship the Scarlets met the Rat City Rollergirls in the first round, and after defeating them, faced London in the quarter-finals, where London edged out a win.

The Scarlets started the 2016 season ranked #6 overall, scheduled games against Texas, Denver, Victorian Roller Derby League, Rose City Rollers (the 2015 WFTDA Champions), Rat City, Bay Area, and Terminal City Rollergirls. At Division 1 Playoffs in Vancouver, Angel City finished in 2nd place for the third straight year, and again advanced to Championships. At the final tournament in Portland, Angel City defeated Montreal Roller Derby in their opening game, but then fell in the quarterfinal bout against Gotham, 197–168.

In 2017, Angel City was the second seed at D1 Playoffs in Seattle, Washington, and won their quarterfinal against Tampa Bay Derby, 287–87. Angel City then defeated Rat City Rollergirls 224–142 in the semifinal, before losing the final to Rose City Rollers, 224–142. At Champs, Angel City won their opening game against Minnesota 281–144, but was then knocked out of the medal round by Denver, 196–165. Angel City then won their consolation game against Rat City, 219–94.

In 2018, Angel City qualified for WFTDA Playoffs in A Coruña, Spain where they took the bronze medal with a 174–146 victory over Rainy City Roller Derby. At WFTDA Championships in New Orleans, Angel City won their opening game against Jacksonville before losing to Victoria in the quarterfinals, and ended their weekend with a consolation round victory over Montreal, 199–118.

In 2019, Angel City maintained the #7 spot for much of the season, sending the Hollywood Scarlets to the WFTDA playoffs as a second seed at Winston-Salem, NC in September 2019. They secured victory in their first game against Bear City from Berlin, Germany, 268–76. The semi-final saw them re-match Rainy City Roller Derby after almost exactly a year, doubling their margin of victory with a final score of 162-106 and securing their spot in the finals. The final game, as seeding would predict, was against the #1 seed Texas Rollergirls (#6 in the world). The Scarlets played a low-scoring, physical game against the Texecutioners, securing their gold medal with a final score of 120–73. A series of team injuries in the post-season would influence their bumpy road to Championships in Montreal, November 13–15, 2019. They faced old rivals Victorian Roller Derby League, and Denver Roller Derby, both of whom defeated the Scarlets.

Angel City entered the 2020 season ranked #7 in the world by WFTDA. Shortly after 2020 season tryouts, the COVID-19 pandemic shut down the league.

Angel City began to reassemble training sessions in mid-2022, with an eye toward a 2023 competitive season. Simultaneously, the WFTDA shifted the Playoffs and Championship season structure to a 2-year cycle, with gameplay counting toward a November 2024 Championship.

The Hollywood Scarlets made a successful run in the West Region, defeating Calgary and Rose City Axles of Annihilation to qualify for a spot at Global Championships for an 8th consecutive time. At the 2024 Global Championships in Portland, OR November 1-3, the Scarlets defeated Toulouse Roller Derby in the first round 171-127. They went on to narrowly lose to Arch Rival Roller Derby (130-151), who would move on to the Championship game against the Rose City Rollers.

Angel City enters the 2025-2026 season ranked #5.

=== WFTDA rankings ===
Season	Final ranking	Playoffs	Championship
2008	6 W	DNQ	DNQ
2009	8 W	8 W	DNQ
2010	12 W	DNQ	DNQ
2011	9 W	9 W	DNQ
2012	8 W	8 W	DNQ
2013	6 WFTDA	3 D1	QF D1
2014	9 WFTDA	2 D1	R1 D1
2015	6 WFTDA	2 D1	QF D1
2016	4 WFTDA	2 D1	QF D1
2017	4 WFTDA	2 D1	CR D1
2018	6 WFTDA	3	CR
2019	7 WFTDA	1	QF D1
2020	N/A - season canceled	N/A	N/A
2021	N/A - season canceled	N/A	N/A
2022	N/A - season canceled	N/A	N/A
2023	4 North America West 9 GUR	N/A - no tournament in new 2 year cycle	N/A - no tournament in new 2 year cycle
2024	5 North America West 7 GUR	3 North America West Playoffs	QF WFTDA Champs
2025 (June)	5 North America West 8 GUR	N/A - no tournament in 2 year cycle	N/A - no tournament in 2 year cycle

- CR = consolation round
- GUR = Geographically Unrestricted Region

The 2020-2022 seasons were canceled due to the COVID-19 Pandemic.

Starting in 2023, the WFTDA shifted to a 2 year cycle for playoff and championship tournaments. Official playoff and championships would only be held in even number years.
