= Scald Eagle =

American roller derby skater

- Scald Eagle holding the Hydra Trophy after her team Rose City Rollers won the 2015 WFTDA Championships.

Personal information
- Nickname: Scald Eagle
- Nationality: American
- Born: Hillary Buscovick
- Spouse: Samara (Lady Trample) Buscovick (formerly Pepperell)

Sport
- Country: United States
- Sport: Roller derby
- Position: Jammer
- League: WFTDA
- Club: Rose City Rollers (2011-16); Denver Roller Derby (2017-present)
- Team: Wheels of Justice (2011-16); Mile High Club (2017-present)

Achievements and titles
- World finals: World Cup winner: 2014, 2018, 2025
- Regional finals: WFTDA Division 1 Playoffs winner: 2014, 2015, 2016, 2017
- National finals: WFTDA Championships: winner 2015, 2016
- Updated on 10 November 2019

Hillary Buscovick, known as Scald Eagle, is an American roller derby skater. She is a star jammer and one of the top scorers of all time for WFTDA Division 1 Playoffs and WFTDA Championships. Notably, Buscovick scored 133 points in the 2015 championship final that saw the Rose City Rollers defeat the five-time defending champion Gotham Girls Roller Derby. Buscovick is also known for her "jukey" jamming technique as well as her signature face paint.

== Early life ==
Buscovick grew up in Gunnison, Colorado and was ice skating by the age four and playing competitive ice hockey by the age of 10. Prior to starting roller derby, she also played softball.

== Roller derby ==
Buscovick first learned about roller derby through the film Whip It. Within days after learning there was a roller derby league in Portland, Oregon, she bought skates and gear and started teaching herself how to roller skate through YouTube videos.

In August 2010, Scald Eagle joined the Rose City Rollers fresh meat program. By January 2011, she was playing for the all-star travel team "Wheels of Justice."

In early 2017, Scald Eagle announced on Facebook that she would be leaving Portland, Oregon and joining Denver Roller Derby’s all-star team “Mile High Club” for the 2017 season.

In September 2019, Buscovick married Denver teammate Samara Pepperell, known as Lady Trample. A game was held the previous day, "Altar*Cation at Elevation," in which each bride-to-be fielded a team of all-stars, with the winning bride keeping her surname in the marriage. The "BuscoVictors" defeated the "Red Hot Chilli Pepperells" 200-197, and so Lady Trample adopted Buscovick as her surname.
