= Duke City Roller Derby =

Roller derby league

- Metro area: Albuquerque, New Mexico
- Country: United States
- Founded: August 2005
- Teams: Muñecas Muertas (A team); Juggernaughties (B team); Disco Brawlers; Dooms Dames; Hobots; Marionettes (junior roller derby)
- Track type(s): Flat
- Venue: Heights Community Center
- Affiliations: WFTDA
- Website: dukecityderby.com

Duke City Roller Derby (DCRD) is a women's flat-track roller derby league based in Albuquerque, New Mexico. Founded in 2005, Duke City is a founding member of the Women's Flat Track Derby Association (WFTDA).

== History ==
Founded in 2005, Duke City is the oldest roller derby organization in Albuquerque. Early on, the league comprised three teams based in Albuquerque, one in Santa Fe and one in Rio Rancho. By 2009, the league had moved its home events to the Santa Ana Star Center in Rio Rancho, with the hopes of drawing 1,000 fans per game.

Originally in the WFTDA's West Region, Duke City was moved to the South Central Region in 2011. Duke City has been credited with developing "slow derby" strategies that are still employed by top teams in the WFTDA.

== Teams ==
Duke City has three home teams, comprising the Disco Brawlers, Dooms Dames and Hobots. Duke City has two travel teams, the Juggernaughties B-team, and the Muñecas Muertas - "Murder Dolls" - A team, which competes against other A teams of members of the WFTDA.

Duke City also operates a junior roller derby branch called the Marionettes, for girls between the ages of 8 and 17.

== WFTDA competition ==
Duke City's all-star travel team, the Mueñcas Muertas, represented the league at the first WFTDA Championships in 2006, where they finished 19th out of 20 teams. At the 2007 WFTDA Western Regional Tournament Duke City won their opening game 110–82 over the Rocky Mountain Rollergirls, but then lost to Tucson Roller Derby in the quarterfinals, 166–41. At the 2008 Western Regional, Duke City opened with a victory over Pikes Peak Derby Dames and then upset the defending WFTDA Champion Kansas City Roller Warriors 132–117, automatically qualifying for Championships. Duke City then lost to Bay Area in the semifinals and Rat City Rollergirls in the third place game to finish Westerns in fourth place. At Championships in Portland, Duke City lost their opening round game to Gotham Girls Roller Derby 182–25. At the 2009 Western Regional, Duke City lost the fifth place game to Bay Area 105–103 to finish in sixth place. As the eighth seed at the 2009 Western Playoff, Duke City lost their opening games to Tucson and Denver, before falling to Sacred City Derby Girls to finish in tenth place.

Ahead of the 2013 season, the WFTDA restructured its playoff system and that year Duke City qualified for the first Division 2 Playoff in Des Moines, Iowa as the sixth seed. Duke City defeated the Omaha Rollergirls 212–189 to finish in seventh place.

=== Rankings ===
Season	Final ranking	Playoffs	Championship
2006	15 WFTDA	—	19
2007	16 WFTDA	QF W	DNQ
2008	NR	4 W	R1
2009	7 W	6 W	DNQ
2010	11 W	10 W	DNQ
2011	13 SC	DNQ	DNQ
2012	13 SC	DNQ	DNQ
2013	55 WFTDA	7 D2	DNQ
2014	107 WFTDA	DNQ	DNQ
2015	181 WFTDA	DNQ	DNQ
2016	136 WFTDA	DNQ	DNQ

== In the community ==
Duke City members do community outreach and fundraising, for organizations such as Ronald McDonald House and the Rape Crisis Center of Central New Mexico.
