= Denver Roller Derby =

Roller derby league

- Metro area: Denver, CO
- Country: United States
- Founded: 2005
- Teams: Mile High Club (A team), Bruising Altitude (B team), Standbys (C team), Bad Apples, Green Barrettes, Orange Crushers, Ground Control (MRDA), Major Turbulence (Juniors)
- Track type: Flat
- Venue: The Rollerdome 2375 S Delaware St Denver CO 80223
- Affiliations: WFTDA, JRDA, MRDA
- Org. type: 501(c)3
- Website: http://www.denverrollerderby.org

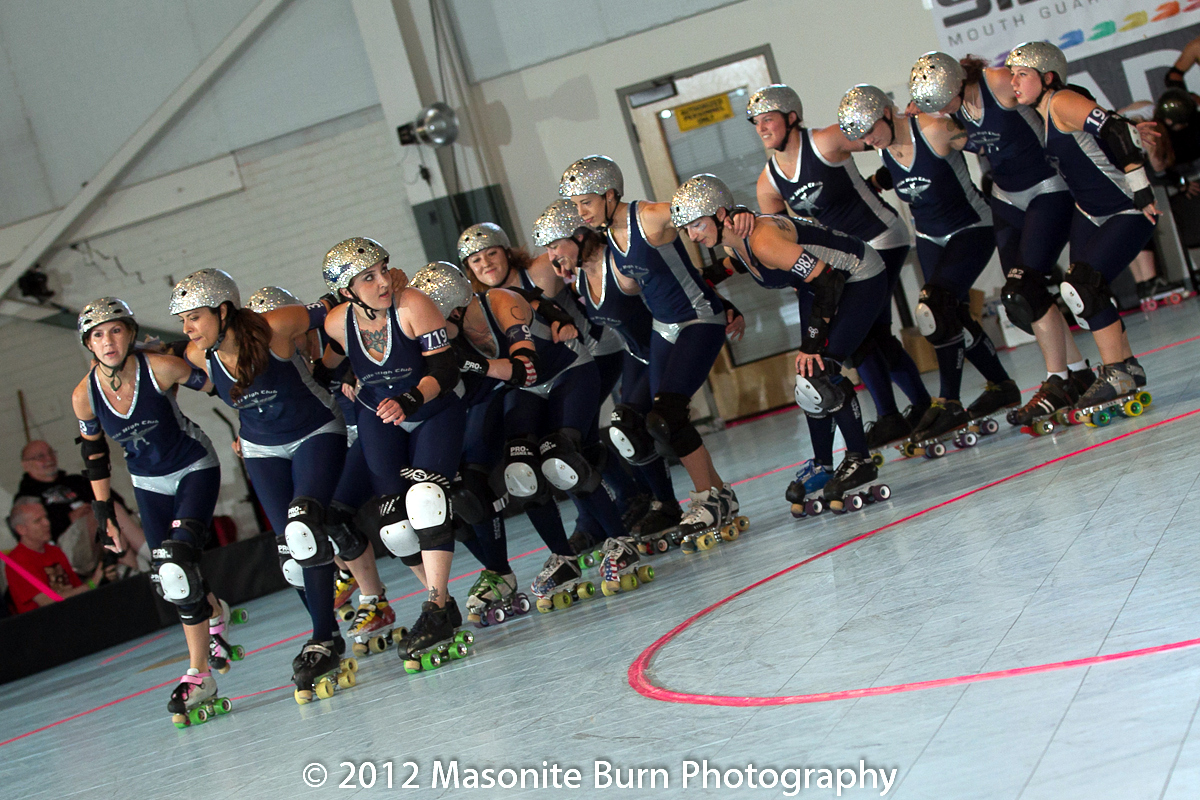
Denver skates out at the 2012 WFTDA Western Region Tournament.

Denver Roller Derby (DRD) is a flat-track roller derby league based in Denver, Colorado. The league was founded in December 2005. Denver Roller Derby is a member of the Women's Flat Track Derby Association (WFTDA), joining in December 2007 as Denver Roller Dolls. In January 2015, the league changed its name to Denver Roller Derby.

== Teams ==
The Denver Roller Derby league is composed of three home teams: the Bad Apples, the Green Barrettes, and the Orange Crushers.

The Mile High Club is the All-Star squad, and represents DRD as a WFTDA A Charter team and the league’s most competitive representative in WFTDA-sanctioned games and tournaments around the world. Bruising Altitude, the league's WFTDA B Charter Team, was formed in 2009 and has made a name for themselves as one of the top teams in the region. These teams compete against other WFTDA and non-WFTDA leagues across the United States. The Standbys, added in 2014, is the competitive WFTDA C Charter team, and also include a non-sanctioned developmental team formed to give more skaters the opportunity to gain interleague experience.

The league has a junior roller derby team, Major Turbulence, which is a member of JRDA. There is also a men's team, Ground Control, who are members of the Men's Roller Derby Association.

== History ==
The Mile High Club began the 2009 season as victors at the Four Corner Feud, a western United States invitational tournament held February 21–22 in Colorado Springs, Colorado. The team's skaters "prov[ed] themselves as the fastest-rising force in Western derby." Other leagues competing in the tournament were Tucson Roller Derby, the Pikes Peak Derby Dames, Arizona Roller Derby, Duke City Roller Derby, and the Rocky Mountain Rollergirls.

The season opener for the home teams was March 28, 2009 and the season culminated in the league championships, which saw the newly reformed Shotgun Betties beat the reigning champions the Bad Apples.

On January 21, 2010, the Denver Roller Dolls announced a partnership with Kroenke Sports Enterprises and AEG Live Rocky Mountains. The partnership included establishing the 1stBank Center in Broomfield, Colorado, as the league's dedicated home venue for 2010.

As of 2015, the league consists of a junior team and a men's team. The junior team, Major Turbulence, is trained by league veterans and holds full membership in the Junior Roller Derby Association; several skaters on the league's travel and home teams transitioned from this junior program. Ground Control is the sole men's flat track derby league in the Denver metropolitan area.

Consequently, in January 2015, the league changed its name to Denver Roller Derby (still abbreviated DRD), in order to reflect the whole member community—skaters, volunteers, officials, and fans regardless of age or gender. Removing "Dolls" from the league name is also intended to help solidify the legitimacy of the sport in the eyes of the public. Burning River Roller Derby of Cleveland and Philly Roller Derby made similar changes in 2015 for similar reasons.

== Training ==
Up until mid-2010, league practices were held at The Wagon Wheel Skate Center in Brighton, Colorado. The league then practiced in a warehouse space in Denver dubbed "The Glitterdome." They currently practice at "The Rollerdome" in Denver. The rigorous training schedule includes strict attendance requirements and additional practices for teams and all-star skaters. Each new skater completes an intensive orientation and training program and may spend as many as 12 months training before joining a team. At any given practice, a skater might complete cardio/endurance, strength, agility, or derby skills drills.

== WFTDA competition ==
In October 2009, the league co-hosted the WFTDA Western Regional Tournament "Derby on the Rocks" with the Rocky Mountain Rollergirls, also of Denver, Colorado. The Denver Roller Dolls Mile High Club placed third in the tournament, earning the first trip to the WFTDA Championships in league history.

At the "Declaration of Derby" National Tournament, held in November in Philadelphia, the Mile High Club took wins over the Kansas City Roller Warriors, the Windy City Rollers and the Rocky Mountain Rollergirls, losing only to ultimate tournament champions the Oly Rollers to secure 3rd place in the tournament. Their first trip to Nationals was not without controversy. The predominant strategy used by the Mile High Club was to slow the speed of the pack dramatically to enable their jammers to rack up points quickly. This was met with confusion and frustration by much of the audience at the tournament.

The Mile High Club went 11–3 for the 2009 season, losing only to the Oly Rollers in April, the Rocky Mountain Rollergirls at the Regional Tournament in October, and the Oly Rollers again at the National Tournament in November.

The Mile High Club had a winning season in 2010, losing only to the Philly Rollergirls by a narrow margin in regular-season play. However, they were defeated by the B.ay A.rea D.erby Girls in the WFTDA West Regional Tournament, by a 132-128 score, and did not advance to the association championship.

The Mile High Club began 2011 by earning a 3-0 record at the Wild West Showdown event in March, defeating the Rat City Rollergirls, the Rose City Rollers, and the Sacred City Derby Girls, and maintained a winning streak into early May by defeating the Philly Rollergirls and the Rose City Rollers in home bouts.

In 2018, Denver received a bye directly to WFTDA Championships, by placing within the top four teams overall, as the fourth seed, in the June 30 rankings. At Championships in New Orleans, Denver finished in fourth place, losing the bronze medal game 164-151 against Gotham.

=== Rankings ===
Season	Final ranking	Playoffs	Championship
2008	4 W	9 W	DNQ
2009	2 W	2 W	3
2010	6 W	6 W	DNQ
2011	5 W	5 W	DNQ
2012	2 W	2 W	3
2013	5 WFTDA	1 D1	4 D1
2014	8 WFTDA	2 D1	R2 D1
2015	7 WFTDA	3 D1	R1 D1
2016	7 WFTDA	2 D1	R1 D1
2017	5 WFTDA	2 D1	4 D1
2018	4 WFTDA	bye	4

- bye = received bye directly to WFTDA Championships

== In the community ==
In addition to athletic pursuits, each member of the Denver Roller Derby must engage in community and volunteer activities to remain in good standing with the league.
