= Oly Rollers =

Roller derby league

- Metro area: Olympia, WA
- Country: United States
- Founded: 2006
- Dissolved: 2020
- Teams: Cosa Nostra Donnas (A team); Dropkick Donnas; Bella Donnas
- Track type: Flat
- Venue: Skateland, Olympia, WA
- Affiliations: USARS, WFTDA

The Oly Rollers were a women's flat-track roller derby league based in Olympia, Washington. Founded in February 2006, the Oly Rollers have won both the WFTDA Championship and the USARS National Championship. The Oly Rollers were a member of the Women's Flat Track Derby Association (WFTDA).

== Teams ==
The Oly Rollers league was composed of three teams: the Cosa Nostra Donnas, their all-star team for interleague competition; the Dropkick Donnas, formerly known as the Prima Donnas; and the Bella Donnas, consisting of their newer recruits.

== WFTDA competition ==
The Cosa Nostra Donnas finished first in the 2009 WFTDA Western Regional Tournament by going undefeated against Duke City Derby, Rat City Rollergirls and Rocky Mountain Rollergirls, qualifying them to compete in the 2009 National Tournament. At the 2009 WFTDA National Championships, the Oly Rollers had first-round bye, and in the second round, defeated Gotham Girls Roller Derby 136-105, eliminating Gotham from the tournament. In the third round, Oly beat the Denver Roller Dolls 178-91, advancing to the championship bout and sending Denver to the third-place bout. Finally, the Cosa Nostra Donnas defeated the Texas Rollergirls 178-100 to claim the 2009 WFTDA championship at the end of an undefeated season.

In 2010, Oly opened their Western Regional with a 267-19 victory over Tucson Roller Derby and a 148-109 win over Rose City Rollers, but fell to Rocky Mountain 127-86 to finish in second place. At the 2010 WFTDA Championships, Oly defeated Nashville Rollergirls 214-53, Windy City Rollers 178-76 and Philly Roller Girls 108-81, before falling to Rocky Mountain 147-146 to finish in second place. Oly skater Sassy was named tournament MVP.

At the 2011 Western Regional, Oly beat Jet City Rollergirls 239-55, Rose City 161-132, and ultimately Rocky Mountain 143-106 to finish in first place. At Championships, Oly defeated Philly 181-95, and beat the Kansas City Roller Warriors 124-104, before losing the final to Gotham (Oly's only loss of 2011) 140-97. In 2012, Oly won their third Western Regional title in four years by defeating Denver Roller Dolls 168-161. At the 2012 Championships, Oly made the final again, but for the second straight year lost the title game to Gotham, 233-130, for their third straight second-place WFTDA Champs finish. As of 2017, this is Oly's last appearance at WFTDA Playoffs or Championships.

In 2013, Oly elected to not meet their gameplay requirements for WFTDA Playoff eligibility, so even though they were ranked at 3rd overall in that year's WFTDA rankings, Oly did not qualify for Division 1 Playoffs. In 2014, Oly met their gameplay requirements (including reaching their required fourth sanctioned game on the final day of June), but when it turned out that the Division 1 Playoff they would be sent to was rescheduled to a weekend when USARS was holding their national championship, Oly declined their invitation to WFTDA Playoffs, as they couldn't field teams for both tournaments simultaneously, and elected for the USARS tournament, as it allowed for junior-aged skaters to play. The WFTDA confirmed that in spite of the declines, Playoff participation was not a requirement of membership and Oly remained a WFTDA member league in good standing. While Oly was ranked within Division 1 territory for the 2015 cycle, again they did not meet gameplay requirements and were not eligible for that year's Playoffs. Oly last received a WFTDA ranking in the April 30, 2016 release, at which point they were ranked #61 overall.

Oly's last ranked WFTDA year was 2016. The team disbanded around 2020 with no notices given on social media aside from inactivity. Oly's last recorded bout was a loss against Jet City Roller Derby in May 2019.

=== Rankings ===
Season	Final ranking	Playoffs	Championship
2009	1 W	1 W	1
2010	2 W	2 W	2
2011	1 W	1 W	2
2012	1 W	1 W	2
2013	11 WFTDA	DNQ	DNQ
2014	21 WFTDA	DNP	DNQ
2015	50 WFTDA	DNQ	DNQ
2016	NR	DNQ	DNQ

- NR = did not receive an end of year ranking this year

== USARS competition ==
In 2012, concurrent with their involvement with WFTDA play, Oly began competing at the USA Roller Sports (USARS) National Championship, and has won every championship to date, as of 2017. Oly won the inaugural USARS National Championship by defeating San Diego Roller Derby 181-35 to claim the first Seltzer Cup. Oly won the USARS Championship again in 2013 by defeating Port T’Orchard Roller Derby, 2014 by defeating Antagonist Roller Derby, in 2015 by defeating the Pennsylvania All-Stars, in 2016 (Oly Rollers sent two teams to the tournament, and "Oly I" claimed the title over "Oly II"), and again in 2017 by defeating a team called Mo Money, as announced by USARS on social media.

Preceded by Gotham Girls Roller Derby	WFTDA Championship winners 2009	Succeeded by Rocky Mountain Rollergirls
Preceded by Texas Rollergirls	WFTDA Western Regional Tournament winners 2009	Succeeded by Rocky Mountain Rollergirls
Preceded by Rocky Mountain Rollergirls	WFTDA Western Regional Tournament winners 2011 and 2012	Succeeded by Tournaments restructured
Preceded by Tournament created	USARS National Championship winners 2012 to present	Succeeded by incumbent
