= Hydra (skater) =

American roller derby skater

Jennifer Thensom Wilson
Personal information
- Nickname: Hydra
- Nationality: American
- Born: San Benito, TX

Sport
- Sport: Roller derby
- Club: Texas Rollergirls
- Team: Hotrod Honeys
- Retired: 2006

Jennifer Wilson, known as Hydra, is a roller derby skater who has played a leading role in the development of the sport.

Hydra joined Bad Girl Good Woman (BGGW) in 2001, around the time that the league was founded. She worked as a hydrologist and selected her derby name in reference both to this, and to the mythological monster. She played a leading role in the team, utilising her experience as a high-level American handball player. later joining its Texas Rollergirls split. She played for Texas in Phoenix, AZ, against the Arizona Roller Derby in 2003, winning the first ever flat track intraleague bout.

Hydra was the creator of the Master Roster of roller derby skater names, maintaining the registry until she transferred the duties in 2005.

Hydra was a founder member of the United Leagues Coalition (ULC), and in 2004 was already envisaging it becoming a national governing body. The ULC later became the Women's Flat Track Derby Association (WFTDA), and she served as the WFTDA's first president. She captained the Texas team which won the 2006 WFTDA Championship. The WFTDA championship trophy is named the Hydra Trophy in her honor.

Hydra stood down as WFTDA's president in 2007, but served on its board of directors until the end of 2009. In 2010, she was still playing roller derby, for the Texas Rollergirls Rec-n-Roller Derby.
