= Jennifer Wilson =

Jennifer Wilson is the name of:

- Jennifer Wilson (actress) (1932–2022), English television actress
- Jennifer Wilson (field hockey) (born 1979), South African field hockey player
- Jennifer Wilson (soprano) (born 1966), American soprano
- Jennifer P. Wilson (born 1975), American judge
- Hydra (skater), roller derby skater, real name Jennifer Wilson

== See also ==
- Jenny Wilson (disambiguation)
