= Bibliography of roller derby =

This annotated bibliography is intended to list both notable and not so notable works of English language, non-fiction and fiction related to the sport of roller derby listed by topic and format, and then year. Although 100% of any book listed is not necessarily devoted to roller derby, all these titles have significant roller skating and roller derby content. Included in this bibliography is a list of classic texts, roller derby history texts and roller derby local league created materials devoted to roller derby.

== Annotations ==
Annotations may reflect descriptive comments from the book's dust jacket, third party reviews or personal, descriptive and qualitative comments by individuals who have read the book. Some older works have links to online versions in the Internet Archive or Google Books.

== Print ==
=== Books ===
==== Roller derby history, bibliographies and literature reviews ====
- Mabe, Catherine (2007). Roller Derby: The History and All-Girl Revival of the Greatest Sport on Wheels. Speck Press. ISBN 978-1-933108-11-7.

==== General roller derby ====
- Michelson, Herb (1971). A Very Simple Game: the Story of Roller Derby.
- Deford, Frank (1971). Five Strides on the Banked Track: The Life and Times of the Roller Derby. Little, Brown and Company. ISBN 0-316-17920-5.
- Coppage, Keith (1999). Roller Derby to Rollerjam: The Authorized Story of an Unauthorized Sport. Santa Rosa, California: Squarebooks. ISBN 0-916290-80-8.
- Fitzpatrick, Jim (2005). Roller Derby Classics... and more!. Trafford Publishing. ISBN 1-4120-6678-6.
- Joulwan, Melissa (February 2007). Rollergirl: Totally True Tales from the Track. Touchstone, Simon & Schuster. ISBN 978-0-7432-9715-8.
- Barbee, Jennifer; Cohen, Alex (2010). Down and Derby: The Insider's Guide to Roller Derby. Soft Skull Press. ISBN 978-1-59376-274-2.
- Gunner, Neil (December 2014). Into Battle: The Roller Derby Experience in Photos and Interviews. Neil Gunner. ISBN 978-0-9937897-0-0.
- Miller, D.D. (June 2016). Eight-Wheeled Freedom: The Derby Nerd's Short History of Flat Track Roller Derby. Wolsak and Wynn. ISBN 978-1-928088-13-4.
- Fitzpatrick, Jim (2021). Ad-Lib To The Blow Off!:The True Story of Professional Roller Derby, the Outlaw Leagues, the Chicago Mob's Involvement and More!. Barnes&Noble Press. ISBN 978-1-666-29029-5.

=== Newspapers and magazines ===
- "SKATING SPEEDWAY". The Cairns Post. Qld.: National Library of Australia. 10 December 1938. p. 14.
- "SKATING SPEEDWAY". The Morning Bulletin. Rockhampton, Qld.: National Library of Australia. 4 January 1939. p. 10.
- "Flying Disc Nonsense Again In U.S." The Advertiser. Adelaide: National Library of Australia. 17 March 1950. p. 2.
- "LARGE CROWD THRILLED BY SKATERS". The Examiner. Launceston, Tas.: National Library of Australia. 13 July 1950. p. 9 Section: The Examiner WOMEN'S SECTION.
- "Thrills and Spills". The Examiner. Launceston, Tas.: National Library of Australia. 14 July 1950. p. 18.
- "VOICE OF AMERICA". The Morning Bulletin. Rockhampton, Qld.: National Library of Australia. 16 April 1951. p. 5.
- "Commandos on skates". The Australian Women's Weekly. National Library of Australia. 14 September 1955. p. 28.
- Dengate, Cayla (27 Jul 2008). "Bullseye Betty and Dr Hell push ahead to a new league". Canberra Times. Archived from the original on January 11, 2010.
- Churchill, Nathan (23 Mar 2011). "IT'S A WOMEN'S DERBY". Canberra, Australia: Canberra Times. Archived from the original on March 26, 2011.
- Warden, Ian (5 Jul 2011). "Surely not surly hurly-burly". Canberra, Australia: Canberra Times. Archived from the original on August 8, 2011.
- fiveonfive, the official magazine of the Women's Flat Track Derby Association
- Blood and Thunder, published since 2005
- Hit and Miss, Australian magazine
- Inside Line, British magazine

=== League publications ===
- "CRDL vs SRDL". Roller Derby. Canberra, Australia: Canberra Roller Derby League. 11 Dec 2010.
- "Surly Griffins vs Black N Blue Belles". Canberra Roller Derby League 2011 Bout Guide. 12 Mar 2011. Canberra, Australia: Canberra Roller Derby League. 2 Apr 2011.

== Film, television, sound ==
=== Documentaries ===
- Justin Herman (director) (1949). Roller Derby Girl (Motion picture). Paramount Pictures.
- Robert Kaylor (director), Jerry Seltzer (producer) (1971). Derby.
- Roller Derby Mania (Motion picture). 1986.
- Roller Derby Wars (Motion picture). 1991.
- Demon Of The Derby (Motion picture). 2001.
- Woodie's World. Episode 32. 2004. ESPN. ESPN.
- Timeless. Episode 9. 2005. ESPN. ESPN.
- Jam (Motion picture). 2006.
- High Heels on Wheels. 2006.
- Rollergirls. Season 1. Episode 1. 2006. A&E Network. A&E Network.
- Rollergirls. Season 1. Episode 2. 2006. A&E Network. A&E Network.
- Rollergirls. Season 1. Episode 3. 2006. A&E Network. A&E Network.
- Rollergirls. Season 1. Episode 4. 2006. A&E Network. A&E Network.
- Rollergirls. Season 1. Episode 5. 2006. A&E Network. A&E Network.
- Rollergirls. Season 1. Episode 6. 2006. A&E Network. A&E Network.
- Rollergirls. Season 1. Episode 7. 2006. A&E Network. A&E Network.
- Rollergirls. Season 1. Episode 8. 2006. A&E Network. A&E Network.
- Rollergirls. Season 1. Episode 9. 2006. A&E Network. A&E Network.
- Rollergirls. Season 1. Episode 10. 2006. A&E Network. A&E Network.
- Rollergirls. Season 1. Episode 11. 2006. A&E Network. A&E Network.
- Rollergirls. Season 1. Episode 12. 2006. A&E Network. A&E Network.
- Rollergirls. Season 1. Episode 13. 2006. A&E Network. A&E Network.
- Hell on Wheels. 2007.
- Blood on the Flat Track. Strand Releasing, Mongrel Media. 2007.
- SportsCenter. 2008. ESPN. ESPN.
- 'Roller Derby Dolls (Television production). Australia: Australian Broadcasting Corporation. 2008.
- Roller Warriors. Season 1. Episode 1. Kansas City, Kansas. 2009. Time Warner Cable Kansas City. Metro Sports.
- Roller Warriors. Season 1. Episode 2. Kansas City, Kansas. 2009. Time Warner Cable Kansas City. Metro Sports.
- Roller Warriors. Season 1. Episode 3. Kansas City, Kansas. 2009. Time Warner Cable Kansas City. Metro Sports.
- Roller Warriors. Season 1. Episode 4. Kansas City, Kansas. 2009. Time Warner Cable Kansas City. Metro Sports.
- Roller Warriors. Season 1. Episode 5. Kansas City, Kansas. 2009. Time Warner Cable Kansas City. Metro Sports.
- Roller Warriors. Season 1. Episode 6. Kansas City, Kansas. 2009. Time Warner Cable Kansas City. Metro Sports.
- Roller Warriors. Season 1. Episode 7. Kansas City, Kansas. 2009. Time Warner Cable Kansas City. Metro Sports.
- Brutal Beauty: Tales of the Rose City Rollers. 2010.

== See also ==
- Annotated bibliography
- Roller derby
