= RMRG =

RMRG may refer to:

- Rapid Metro Rail Gurgaon
- Rocky Mountain Rollergirls
