= Hydra Trophy =

- Awarded for: winner of the WFTDA Championship tournament
- Presented by: WFTDA
- First award: 2008
- Currently held by: Victorian Roller Derby League (Melbourne, VIC, Australia)
- Website: WFTDA.com

The Hydra Trophy is the trophy awarded to the Women's Flat Track Derby Association (WFTDA) team that wins the WFTDA Championship Tournament at the conclusion of every WFTDA roller derby season.

Named in honor of Hydra, founding member of the WFTDA and first president of the association, the Hydra Trophy was first presented to the 2008 champions at the Northwest Knockdown in Portland, Oregon.

== Winners ==
| Year | League | Metro area |
|---|---|---|
| 2008 | Gotham Girls Roller Derby | New York, NY, United States |
| 2009 | Oly Rollers | Olympia, WA, United States |
| 2010 | Rocky Mountain Rollergirls | Denver, CO, United States |
| 2011 | Gotham Girls Roller Derby | New York, NY, United States |
| 2012 | Gotham Girls Roller Derby | New York, NY, United States |
| 2013 | Gotham Girls Roller Derby | New York, NY, United States |
| 2014 | Gotham Girls Roller Derby | New York, NY, United States |
| 2015 | Rose City Rollers | Portland, OR, United States |
| 2016 | Rose City Rollers | Portland, OR, United States |
| 2017 | Victorian Roller Derby League | Melbourne, VIC, Australia |
| 2018 | Rose City Rollers | Portland, OR, United States |
| 2019 | Rose City Rollers | Portland, OR, United States |
| 2024 | Rose City Rollers | Portland, OR, United States |
| 2026 | Victorian Roller Derby League | Melbourne, VIC, Australia |

*The 2020 International WFTDA Championships were canceled in May due to the Covid-19 pandemic.

Winners Before the Hydra Trophy:

| Year | League | Metro area |
|---|---|---|
| 2006 | Texas Rollergirls | Austin, TX |
| 2007 | Kansas City Roller Warriors | Kansas City, MO |
