= Jenny Wilson =

Jenny Wilson is the name of:

- Jenny Wilson (politician) (born 1965), American politician in Salt Lake City
- Jenny Wilson (singer) (born 1975), Swedish singer-songwriter
- Jenny Wilson (comics), a character in The Wicked + The Divine

== See also ==
- Jennifer Wilson (disambiguation)
