= Rose City Rollers =

Roller derby league

- Metro area: Portland, Oregon
- Country: United States
- Founded: 2004
- Teams: Wheels of Justice (Travel team); Break Neck Betties; Guns N Rollers; Heartless Heathers; High Rollers; Wreckers (Recreational team) Junior teams: • Rosebuds Travel Team • The Undead Avengers • The Rainbow Bites • Death Scar Derby Droids • Bleeding Hearts • • Rose Petals Travel Team • Bad Apples • Skaters of Doom • Killer Bees •
- Track type: Flat
- Venue: The Hangar at Oaks Amusement Park
- Affiliations: WFTDA
- Org. type: 501(c)(3) NPO
- Website: rosecityrollers.com

The Rose City Rollers is a women's flat track roller derby league based in Portland, Oregon, operating as a 501(c)3 non-profit organization, and is a founding member of the Women's Flat Track Derby Association (WFTDA). Established in 2004, the Rose City Rollers consists of a recreational program, four adult local home teams, and two all-star travel teams that represent the league in competition with others as well as junior skaters on six home teams with a travel team for Rose Petals (7–12) and a travel team for Rosebuds (12–17). Rose City's all-star travel team "Wheels of Justice" won the WFTDA Championships in 2015, 2016, 2018 and 2019.

== History and league structure ==
Exterior of the team's venue at Oaks Amusement Park, 2026

Founded in 2004 by Kim "Rocket Mean" Stegeman, along with Evette Reyes (among others), Rose City Rollers became a founding member of the Women's Flat Track Derby Association (WFTDA) in 2005. In November 2008, Rose City and Rat City Rollergirls (Seattle) co-hosted the Northwest Knockdown national championships at the Portland Expo Center. Rose City hosted the 2011 WFTDA Western Regional Tournament, the "Bridgetown Brawl", at the Memorial Coliseum in Portland, in which they placed third overall.

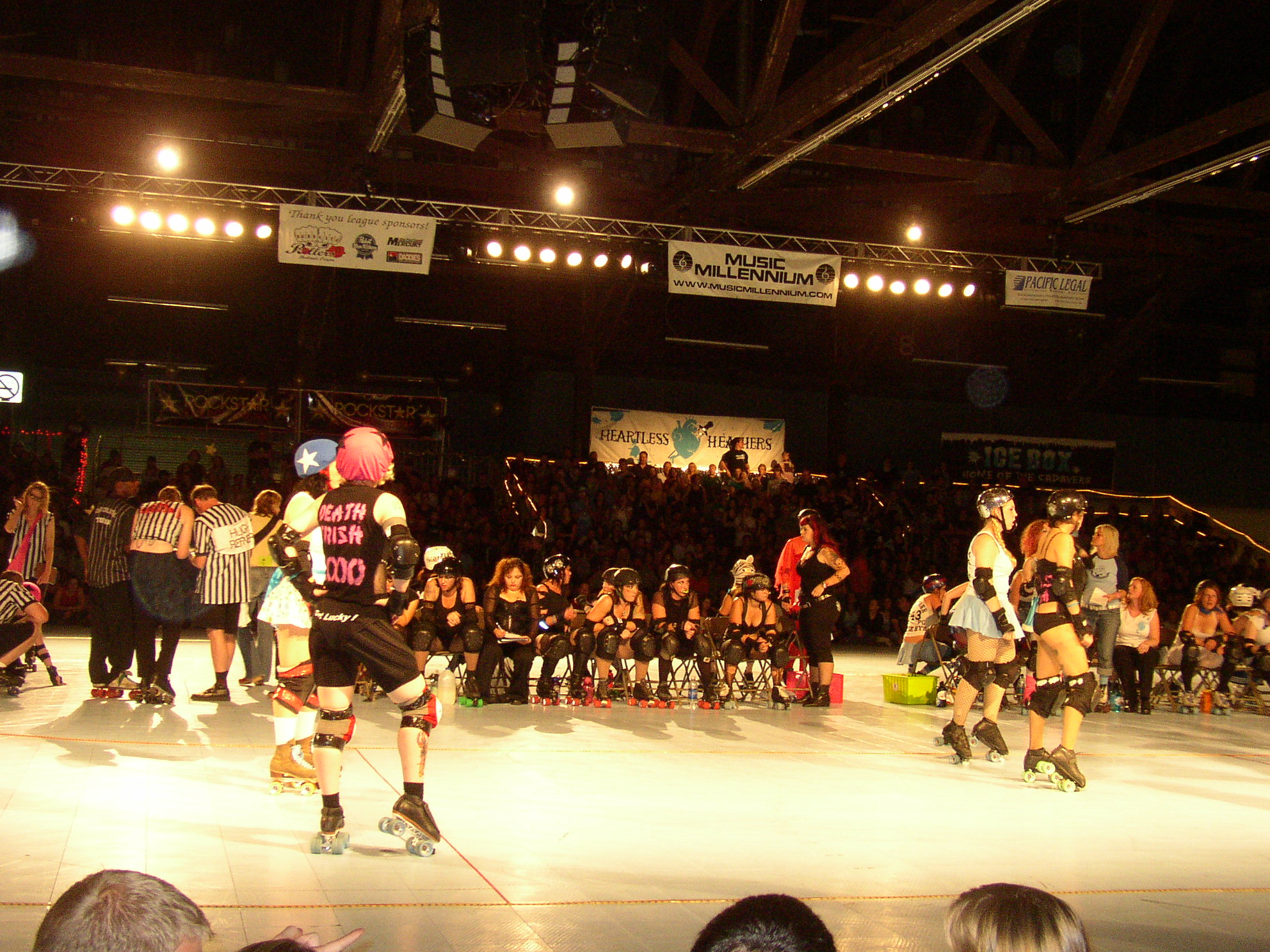
The Rose City Rollers.

Rose City Rollers is one of the largest modern roller derby leagues in the United States, if not the world. Rose City comprises a multitude of teams at various levels of competition, and hosts games at The Hangar at Oaks Amusement Park, where they draw up to 22,000 fans a year for games. Rose City has two travel teams, the Wheels of Justice A team and the Axles of Annihilation B team, plus four home teams: the Break Neck Betties, Guns N Rollers, Heartless Heathers and High Rollers.

=== Other programs ===
- Rockets – The Rockets (formerly Fresh Meat) was a training program that prepared skaters for derby play at the competitive level by providing the skills and conditioning necessary to play for RCR home teams. All incoming skaters were required to take part in the Rockets program to be eligible for a league draft and skaters were drafted from this group to be the newest Rose City Rollers home team players. This program was replaced by a draft boot camp program around the 2017/18 season. Skaters that are not drafted return to the Wreckers program.
- Wreckers – A recreational (non-competitive/charter) program designed to make roller derby available for skaters that do not want to participate at a home team or travel team level. This program is open to women and gender-expansive players 18 and over that are interested in playing derby at both the competitive and non-competitive level and is often the first step into the league. The Wreckers program also plays both home and away games throughout the year.
- Rosebuds – Portland's junior roller derby program provides opportunities for personal growth and development for skaters aged 13–17.
- Rose Petals – In 2014, the junior roller derby program expanded to include skaters aged 7–13 years old.

== WFTDA competition ==
Rose City took part in the first WFTDA Championships in February 2006, the "Dust Devil" invitational tournament, in which they placed 16th out of 20 teams. At the first WFTDA Western Regional Tournament (also named the Dust Devil) Rose City lost in the opening round 95–92 to Sin City Rollergirls of Las Vegas and were eliminated. Rose City and Rat City Rollergirls co-hosted the Northwest Knockdown 2008 national championships at the Portland Expo Center. Rose City did not compete at Championships however, after losing to B.ay A.rea D.erby Girls at the Western Regional tournament. At the 2009 Western Regional Tournament, Rose City finished in seventh place with a 241–42 victory over Angel City Derby Girls. In 2010, Rose City came up just short of qualifying for Championships, losing the third place game at Western Regionals 133–102 to Bay Area.

Original Rose City logo

2011 was Rose City's most successful year to that point, finishing the season with their highest ranking position to date (third in the West Region), and qualifying for Championships for the first time since 2006, by defeating Rat City Rollergirls 186–134 to finish the Western Regional Tournament in third place. At Championships, Rose City was knocked out in the opening round by the Kansas City Roller Warriors 143–135. Rose City finished fourth at the 2012 West Region tournament, losing 135–123 to Bay Area in the third-place game. At the first Division 1 Playoff in 2013 at Fort Wayne, Rose City was upset in the opening round by London Rollergirls 193–190, but won their remaining games to finish the weekend in 5th place.

Since 2014, Rose City has made the final game at the WFTDA Championships every year. After taking first place at the 2014 Division 1 tournament in Charleston, West Virginia, Rose City advanced all the way to the final game of the Championships in Nashville, narrowly falling to Gotham Girls Roller Derby, 147–144.

In 2015, the Wheels of Justice again won their Division 1 Playoff, this time in Dallas, where they beat Texas Rollergirls 257–223 in the final. At the Championships in Saint Paul in November, Rose City upset top-seeded Gotham 206–195 to take the 2015 WFTDA Championships and won the Hydra Trophy, dethroning Gotham after their four-year championship run. Rose City won their third straight Division 1 tournament in September 2016, taking the final game 250–137 over Denver Roller Derby. In November, Rose City retained its Championships title, coming from behind to again defeat Gotham in the final.

Ahead of the 2017 season, Rose City was on both ends of significant skater transfers, as sisters Scald Eagle and Brawn Swanson moved to Denver and joined Denver Roller Derby, while Bonnie Thunders moved from New York to Portland and joined Rose City. Rose City claimed first place at the 2017 Division 1 Playoff in Seattle with a 227–120 victory over Angel City. At Championships, Rose City played in the final for the fourth straight year but came up short, losing to Victorian Roller Derby League 180–101.

In 2018, Rose City received a bye directly to WFTDA Championships, by placing within the top four teams overall, as the second seed, in the June 30 rankings. At Championships in New Orleans in November, Rose City claimed their third title in four years in a rematch from 2017's final against Victoria, 144–121. Rose City skater Rochelle "Gal of Fray" Jubert was named tournament MVP.

RCR took first place at the 2019 International Championships in Montreal, Quebec, Canada, making it their fourth world championship.

=== Rankings ===
Scald Eagle with the Hydra Trophy after winning the 2015 WFTDA Championships

The Wheels of Justice are Rose City's WFTDA charter team and compete against other WFTDA teams in sanctioned play, and qualify for rankings.

Season	Final ranking	Playoffs	Championship
2006	16 WFTDA	—	16
2007	15 WFTDA	R1 W	DNQ
2008	5 W	7 W	DNQ
2009	5 W	7 W	DNQ
2010	4 W	4 W	DNQ
2011	3 W	3 W	R1
2012	4 W	4 W	DNQ
2013	4 WFTDA	5 D1	DNQ
2014	2 WFTDA	1 D1	2 D1
2015	4 WFTDA	1 D1	1 D1
2016	3 WFTDA	1 D1	1 D1
2017	2 WFTDA	1 D1	2 D1
2018	2 WFTDA	bye	1

- bye = received bye directly to WFTDA Championships

== See also ==
- Women's sports in Portland, Oregon

Preceded by Gotham Girls Roller Derby	WFTDA Championship winners 2015 – 2016	Succeeded by Victorian Roller Derby League
Preceded by Victorian Roller Derby League	WFTDA Championship winners 2018 – 2019	Succeeded by Current champions
