= Blood on the Flat Track =

Blood on the Flat Track: The Rise of the Rat City Rollergirls
- Directed by: Lainy Bagwell; Lacey Leavitt
- Produced by: Leaky-Sleazewell Productions
- Cinematography: Lainy Bagwell; Wes Johnson
- Edited by: Lainy Bagwell; Wes Johnson
- Release date: June 14, 2007 (SIFF)
- Running time: 92 minutes
- Country: United States
- Language: English

Blood on the Flat Track: The Rise of the Rat City Rollergirls is a documentary film produced and directed by Lainy Bagwell and Lacey Leavitt. The film documents the formative years of the Seattle women's flat track roller derby league, the Rat City Rollergirls.

== Plot ==
With more than 30 leagues nationwide at the time forming the Women's Flat Track Derby Association, Blood on the Flat Track focuses on the Rat City Rollergirls of Seattle, who formed their league from scratch in April 2004. In the first season, the league started playing at a small rink in front of about 200 fans; they now sell out of stadiums monthly. This film follows the teams throughout its first two seasons and focuses on the women who comprise the league, their teams' struggle to win the championship bout and their relationships with each other.

== Festival participation ==
- Seattle International Film Festival – World Premiere – June 14, 2007
- Calgary International Film Festival – September 2007
- Ellensburg Film Festival – October 2007
- Tallgrass Film Festival – October 2007
- Detroit Docs Film Festival – October 2007 – Founders Award Winner
- Seattle Lesbian and Gay Film Festival – October 2007 – Best Local Film – Jury Award Winner, Best Local Film – Audience Award Winner
- Olympia Film Festival – November 2007
- Northwest Film and Video Festival – November 2007
- Mid-Valley Film and Video Festival – February 2008
- Aarhus Festival of Independent Art – European Premiere – March 12, 2008
- Memphis International Film Festival – March 2008
- Canadian Sports Film Festival – May 2008 – Opening Night Gala Film
- Michigan Womyn's Music Festival – August 2008
- Mardi Gras Film Festival – Sydney, Australia – February 2009
- Brisbane Queer Film Festival – April 2009

== Home media ==
Blood on the Flat Track was released on DVD in Canada on October 6, 2009, by Mongrel Media and was released in the United States by Strand Releasing on February 23, 2010.
