= Arizona Roller Derby =

Roller derby league

- Metro area: Phoenix, Arizona
- Country: United States
- Founded: 2003
- Teams: Arizona All-Stars (A team); Arizona Rising (B teams); Bad News Beaters; Surlies; Midnight Storm; Skate Riot Project; Rumbleweeds; Valley Rollers; Desert Phantoms
- Track type(s): Flat
- Venue: Ability 360 Sports and Fitness Center
- Affiliations: WFTDA (West Region)
- Org. type: non-profit
- Website: arizonarollerderby.com

Arizona Roller Derby is Arizona's first all female roller derby league. It was founded in 2003 making it one of the oldest resurgence roller derby leagues in America. Arizona Roller Derby, abbreviated as AZRD, is one of the founding members of the Women's Flat Track Derby Association.

AZRD is based in Phoenix, Arizona and holds their games at Ability 360.

== History ==
=== Tucson splits to form TRD ===
In the early days of AZRD, there was a separate chapter in Tucson called Tucson-Arizona Roller Derby, which had a single team called the Furious Truckstop Waitresses. The logistics of being a two-city league were not cost-effective, and the chapter split from AZRD to create Tucson Roller Derby. Upon its split from AZRD, Tucson Roller Derby became the first 501(c) roller derby league in the nation.

=== Rules and league splits ===
The first AZRD games were "no rules/no holds barred". As the overall sport was starting to evolve and establish rules, some skaters would split away from AZRD to form other leagues:

- AZRD team French Kiss Army left AZRD to form Renegade Rollergirls, a league that continues to play the no-rules no-holds-barred style of roller derby.
- In 2005, four skaters from AZRD left to create Arizona Derby Dames (AZDD), with the ambition of becoming a banked track roller derby league. After skating four seasons on a flat track, AZDD became a banked track organization in 2010.

=== Arizona Bruisers, LLC ===
In 2007, members of the Bruisers team, with the aim of raising funds specific to the team and having more opportunities to skate, formed a limited liability company (LLC) called Arizona Bruisers, LLC. Citing violations of the league's "non-compete" policies, AZRD threatened the skaters with expulsion from the league. In addition, issues were reported as a result of the registration of the name "Bruisers" with the Arizona Corporation Commission relating to an agreement that AZRD has with the Brewcity Bruisers, a WFTDA member league from Milwaukee.

In January, 2008, despite efforts to settle differences, the Arizona Bruisers announced that they were now independent of Arizona Roller Derby in an effort to position themselves as a high-level travel team. AZRD continued to use the "Bruisers" name for one of their home teams.

After two scrimmages between a squad from Duke City Derby and the Copper Queens from Tucson Roller Derby, the Arizona Bruisers would eventually be called the Phoenix City Rollers and then by March, 2008 would ultimately dissolve.

The Bruisers were revived as one of the four AZRD bouting teams. For the 2009–2010 season, amid a declining membership experienced in 2008 and 2009, AZRD reduced the number of home teams from 4 to 3. As a result, AZRD would use the name "Bruisers" to identify their secondary travel team (or B-Team). This reflects an ongoing trend in WFTDA to form B-teams to help develop skaters to eventually play on the sanctioned travel (A) team as well as to help train apprentice leagues. They were "reinstated" as a beginner home team squad in 2012, only to be removed once again due to membership fluctuations.

=== Restructure as a 501(c) corporation ===
At a 2010 league meeting, AZRD league management decided to restructure the league from a limited liability company to a non-profit corporation under section 501(c) of the Internal Revenue Code. This allowed the league to solicit tax deductible funding from sponsors.

== Travel Teams ==
The Tent City Terrors, named after the Tent City jail created by Sheriff Joe Arpaio as a cost-effective way to address jail overcrowding, is AZRD's travel team that plays in bouts sanctioned by WFTDA.

In 2012, Arizona qualified for West Region Playoffs as the 7th seed, and finished the tournament in 10th place.

In 2014, Arizona made their first appearance at Division 1 Playoffs in Evansville, Indiana, entering the weekend as the 10th seed, and finishing in 5th place. Arizona returned to D1 Playoffs in 2015 as the 8th seed in Tucson, and finished in 9th place.

In 2016 Arizona finished their D1 Playoff again in 9th place, having entered the Vancouver tournament as the 10th seed. In 2016, a second travel team was founded, Phoenix Rising. In August 2016, they played against five teams from California in the Golden Bowl, a tournament hosted by Bay Area Derby.

In 2017, Arizona lost the opening game of the Dallas Division 1 playoff 163–108 to Philly Roller Derby, and also lost their consolation round game to Dallas Derby Devils, 183–153. The league announced in September 2017 that they would be retiring the Tent City Terrors name following the 2017 season.

In 2018 the league declined their invitation to the WFTDA Playoffs in A Coruña, Spain.

A third travel team, The Chain Gang is a mixture of state and city level skaters and has skated against teams in Arizona and Texas.

In 2018, the league rebranded their travel teams. The Tent City Terrors is now the Arizona All-Stars, Arizona Rising has remained the same and The Chain Gang is now the Rumbleweeds.

=== Rankings ===
Season	Final ranking	Playoffs	Championship
2006	4 WFTDA	—	3
2007	12 WFTDA	R2 W	R1
2008	N/A	DNQ	DNQ
2009	12 W	DNQ	DNQ
2010	13 W	DNQ	DNQ
2011	13 W	DNQ	DNQ
2012	13 W	10 W	DNQ
2013	72 WFTDA	DNQ	DNQ
2014	34 WFTDA	5 D1	DNQ
2015	36 WFTDA	9 D1	DNQ
2016	35 WFTDA	9 D1	DNQ
2017	29 WFTDA	CR D1	DNQ
2018	20 WFTDA	DNP	DNQ

- CR = consolation round
- DNP = did not play

== Home teams ==
As of 2020, Arizona Roller Derby has six home teams competing at two levels.

AZRD's four state teams play each other in intra-league play, as well as teams from Tucson, Flagstaff, and Northern Arizona in the Arizona State Conference. They are:

- Skate Riot Project have a project mayhem theme. Their colors are neon green and pink.
- The Bad News Beaters have a baseball theme. Their colors are blue and yellow.
- The Surlies have a pirate theme. Their colors are black and red.
- Midnight Storm have a storm theme. Their colors are silver and purple.

One team bridges the gap between the city and state level skaters, the Rumbleweeds.

City level teams play each other at home bouts. They are:

- The Valley Rollers have a casino theme. Their colors are green and gold.
- The Desert Phantoms have a dark phantom theme. Their colors are black and purple.

== Cycles ==
Prior to being drafted to a team, new skaters go through three training cycles. In the first (C1), they learn basic skate skills to ensure safety. In the second, (C2), new skaters begin to learn basic elements of game play and contact, and in the third (C3) they begin scrimmaging and learning more advanced game play techniques, preparing them for being placed on a city team.

== Junior Roller Derby ==
AZRD has an open junior roller derby program for kids age 8–17, founded in 2010. There are two junior home teams, and a travel team that participates in play at the national level. Once junior skaters turn 18, they can become eligible to begin skating on an adult team. The junior skaters play under the Junior Roller Derby Association (JRDA) ruleset.

=== Standings ===
2008–2009 Season

Seed	Team	Bouts	Win	Lose	PF	PA	(+/-)
	Bruisers	2	2	0	196	118	+39.0
	Brawlarinas	3	2	1	299	252	+15.6
	Bad News Beaters	2	1	1	218	198	+10.0
	Surly Gurlies	3	0	3	213	358	-48.3

The April 2009 bout between the Beaters and the Bruisers was cancelled as a result of flooding at the Castle Sports Club. AZRD decided to do the Championship bout in the format of a round-robin tournament involving all 4 teams. In the tournament, the Surly Gurlies, a team who had an 0–3 regular season record would win all three of their games and be the 2008–2009 AZRD Champions.

2007–2008 Season

Seed	Team	Bouts	Win	Lose	PF	PA	(+/-)
1	Bad News Beaters	3	3	0	350	210	+46.7
	Bruisers (see note)	3	1	2	207	212	-4.3
2	Surly Gurlies	3	1	2	212	258	-15.3
3	Brawlarinas	3	1	2	190	271	-27.0

During this season a group of skaters who were mainly on the Bruisers left AZRD to form their own independent team. The one win in the record was from the pre-split Bruiser team. A new Bruiser team was formed mid-season with Ivanna S. Pankin as team captain. At the end of the season, it was decided that the Surly Gurlies and the Brawlarinas would be moved up in the rankings and those three teams would go to the post season.

Playoff Game: (#2)Surly Gurlies 74 vs. (#3)Brawlarinas 60 - Surly Gurlies advance to the Championship Game.

Championship Game: (#1)Bad News Beaters 113 vs. Surly Gurlies 50 - Bad News Beaters win championship.
