= WFTDA Championships =

Roller derby competition

- 2006–present
- The Hydra Trophy.

Tournament information
- Location: various
- Month played: varies
- Established: 2006
- Format: Knockout

Current champion
- Victorian Roller Derby League

The International Women's Flat Track Derby Association Championships ("WFTDA Championships" or "Champs" for short) are the leading competition for roller derby leagues.

The Championships are organized by the Women's Flat Track Derby Association (WFTDA). They originated in 2007 as the Inaugural National WFTDA Championship "Texas Shootout" held in Austin, Texas. Previously the "Dust Devil" tournament in 2006 featured teams from across the US, was held in front of several thousand fans in Tucson, Arizona. This was the first multi-league flat track roller derby tournament.

In 2019, the Championships were hosted outside the United States for the first time, in Montreal, Canada. 2026 will mark the first Championships held outside of North America, taking place in Europe.

== Format ==
2015 MVP Scald Eagle of the Rose City Rollers with the Hydra Trophy after the 2015 WFTDA Championships

In 2007, Western and Eastern Region Tournaments were held in order to determine qualifiers for the "Texas Shootout" National Championship, held in Austin, Texas. By 2010, with leagues in Canada and the United Kingdom also enjoying membership of the WFTDA, "National" was dropped from the title of the contest.

Through the 2012 WFTDA season, the WFTDA was divided into regions based on geography. Each region held a tournament contested by its top ten leagues: the Eastern (2007–2012), North Central (2009–2012), South Central (2009–2012) and Western (2007–2012) Regional Tournaments. The top three leagues from each of these four tournaments qualified for the Championships. Together, the qualifying tournaments and Championships were termed the "Big 5".

From 2013 through 2016, full WFTDA members were eligible for ranking in one of the association's three divisions. Division 1 comprised the top 40-ranked teams in the WFTDA, and the top 40 teams that met eligibility requirements based on the June 30 rankings of that year were invited to Division 1 Playoffs, and were divided into four playoff tournaments (10 per tournament) using an S-curve for seeding. Participants in Division 1 Playoffs were not required to be current members of Division 1, as long as they meet ranking and other requirements. The teams that finished first through third at each Division 1 Tournament then moved on to the WFTDA Championship tournament. Division 2 comprised the teams ranked 41 through 100, and the next 20 teams overall that meet requirements after the 40 confirmed Division 1 playoff participants were then invited to Division 2 Playoffs, divided into two playoff tournaments. The top 2 teams of each Division 2 Tournament then played each other at the WFTDA Championship Tournament, with the winner crowned the Division 2 champion. Through 2014, Division 3 comprised all ranked teams from 101 on, and there are no Division 3 Playoffs.

Starting with the 2017 season, the top 36 teams compete in three Division 1 Playoff Tournaments, and the top four finishers from each tournament go on to the WFTDA Championship Tournament. The next 16 eligible teams compete in a single Division 2 Playoff Tournament, with the winner crowned the Division 2 champion.

Since 2008, the winner of the Championships has been awarded the Hydra Trophy.

== Broadcast ==
The tournament is broadcast on the WFTDA online service WFTDA.tv on a pay-per-view basis. In 2015 the WFTDA entered into a partnership with ESPN whereby the Sunday games of the tournament – the Division 1 and Division 2 championship and 3rd place games – were carried on ESPN3. For 2017 the format was changed, with the Division 2 Championship occurring earlier in the year, and the Division 1 championship game scheduled to be broadcast on ESPN2, marking the first time contemporary women's flat track roller derby was aired live on American network television.

== Championships ==
Year	Date	Name	Location	Champion	Second	Third	MVP
2006	24–26 February	Dust Devil*	Tucson, Arizona	Texas Rollergirls	Tucson Roller Derby	Arizona Roller Derby	Eight Track (Texas)
2007	28–30 September	Texas Shootout	Austin, Texas	Kansas City Roller Warriors	Rat City Rollergirls	Texas Rollergirls	Xcelerator (Kansas City); Miss Fortune (Rat City)
2008	14–16 November	Northwest Knockdown	Portland, Oregon	Gotham Girls Roller Derby	Windy City Rollers	Philly Rollergirls	Bonnie Thunders (Gotham)
2009	13–15 November	Declaration of Derby	Philadelphia, Pennsylvania	Oly Rollers	Texas Rollergirls	Denver Roller Dolls	Heffer (Oly); Rice Rocket (Texas); Fonda Payne (Denver); Whipity Pow (Rocky Mountain)
2010	5–7 November	Uproar on the Lakeshore	Chicago, Illinois	Rocky Mountain Rollergirls	Oly Rollers	Gotham Girls Roller Derby	Sassy (Oly)
2011	11–13 November	Continental Divide and Conquer	Broomfield, Colorado	Gotham Girls Roller Derby	Oly Rollers	Texas Rollergirls	Kelley Young (Kansas City)
2012	2–4 November	Grits and Glory	Atlanta, Georgia	Gotham Girls Roller Derby	Oly Rollers	Denver Roller Dolls	Sandrine Rangeon (Denver); Shaina Serelson (Denver)
2013	8–10 November	WFTDA Championships	Milwaukee, Wisconsin	Gotham Girls Roller Derby	Texas Rollergirls	B.ay A.rea D.erby Girls	Bloody Mary (Texas)
2014	31 October – 2 November	WFTDA Championships	Nashville, Tennessee	Gotham Girls Roller Derby	Rose City Rollers	B.ay A.rea D.erby Girls	Loren Mutch (Rose)
2015	6–8 November	WFTDA Championships	St Paul, Minnesota	Rose City Rollers	Gotham Girls Roller Derby	Victorian Roller Derby League	Scald Eagle (Rose)
2016	4–6 November	WFTDA Championships	Portland, Oregon	Rose City Rollers	Gotham Girls Roller Derby	Victorian Roller Derby League	Brawn Swanson (Rose)
2017	3–5 November	WFTDA Championships	Philadelphia, Pennsylvania	Victorian Roller Derby League	Rose City Rollers	Gotham Girls Roller Derby	Lady Trample (Victoria)
2018	9–11 November	WFTDA Championships	New Orleans, Louisiana	Rose City Rollers	Victorian Roller Derby League	Gotham Girls Roller Derby	Gal of Fray (Rose)
2019	15–17 November	WFTDA Championships	Montreal, Québec	Rose City Rollers	Gotham Girls Roller Derby	Victorian Roller Derby League	Bonita Apple Bomb (Gotham)
2020	2020 postseason canceled due to the COVID-19 pandemic						
2024	1–3 November	WFTDA Championships	Portland, Oregon	Rose City Rollers	Arch Rival Roller Derby	Denver Roller Derby	Pavey Wavey (Victoria)
2026	15-18 October	WFTDA Championships	Malmö, Sweden	Victorian Roller Derby League	Rose City Rollers	Arch Rival Roller Derby	Lilou (Toulouse)

Team	Champ	2nd Place	3rd place
Gotham Roller Derby	5	3	3
Rose City Rollers	5	3	0
Victorian Roller Derby League	2	1	3
Oly Rollers	1	3	0
Texas Rollergirls	1*	2	2
Kansas City Roller Warriors	1	0	0
Rocky Mountain Rollergirls	1	0	0
Arch Rival Roller Derby	0	1	1
Tucson Roller Derby	0	1	0
Rat City Roller Derby	0	1	0
Windy City Rollers	0	1	0
Denver Roller Derby	0	0	3
Bay Area Derby	0	0	2
Philly Roller Derby	0	0	1
Arizona Roller Derby	0	0	1

=== 2006 Dust Devil ===
In Tucson, Arizona, over the weekend of February 24–26, 2006, Tucson Roller Derby hosted 20 WFTDA leagues from around the United States in a tournament.

Round-robin bouts were instituted to determine seeding for a single-elimination tournament. Four pools were created, titled Scorpion, Tarantula, Black Widow and Rattlesnake, with each pool consisting of 5 teams. On Friday, February 24, 2006, each team played four ten-minute bouts in each pool. Point differential was used to determine the ranking and placement of each team within its pool. With this information in hand, tournament officials selected the top three teams of each pool and seeded them according to the point differential of each team for the single-elimination tournament.

The single-elimination tournament started on Saturday, February 25, 2006 with 12 of the previous day's 20 teams. Scheduling of the bouts allowed for the top four seeded teams to receive a bye in the first round of play. Teams seeded 5 through 12 played in the first round. The winners of the first round of the single elimination tournament played the top four seeds in the second round. Bout winners advanced to the semi-finals and bout losers were eliminated.

On Sunday February 26, 2006, four teams (Texas Rollergirls Texecutioners, Tucson Roller Derby Saddle Tramps, Minnesota Rollergirls All-Stars and Arizona Roller Derby Tent City Terrors) played in the semi-final bouts. In the first bout, the Texecutioners defeated the Tent City Terrors in a full three-period bout, 114 to 81, sending the Texas to the championship bout and Arizona to the 3rd-place bout. A second full three-period semi-final bout was played between Tucson and the Minnesota Rollergirls. Tucson defeated Minnesota 136–75. This pitted the Tent City Terrors against Minnesota for the 3rd-place bout, and set the WFTDA National Championship Bout to be between Texas and Tucson. The 3rd-place bout was played out with the Tent City Terrors upsetting 3rd-seeded Minnesota 115–88. The Championship bout was finalized later in the evening, with the Texecutioners defeating the Saddle Tramps 129–96.

The tournament also saw the first collaboration between roller derby announcers. Following the event, announcer Bob Noxious founded "Voices of Reason", an announcers' association.

=== 2007 Texas Shootout ===
On September 30, 2007, the Kansas City Roller Warriors beat the Rat City Rollergirls 89–85 in the final match of the Texas Shootout to become the first WFTDA National Champions. The Texas Rollergirls placed third. Eight teams competed in the tournament, four from the eastern regional division and four from the western regional division. These teams included Carolina Rollergirls (fourth place), Gotham Girls Roller Derby, Tucson Roller Derby, Detroit Derby Girls, and Windy City Rollers.

Several marketing materials as well as a statement from WFTDA President "Crackerjack" on page 5 of the program for this event confirms that at the time it was considered the "first WFTDA Championship Tournament."

=== 2008 Northwest Knockdown ===
On November 16, 2008, the Gotham Girls Roller Derby (GGRD All-Stars) beat the Windy City Rollers 134–66 in the championship bout. The Philly Rollergirls (Liberty Belles) beat the Texas Rollergirls (Texecutioners) 114–95 in the consolation bout to take third place.

=== 2009 Declaration of Derby ===
Declaration of Derby, the 2009 WFTDA Championship tournament took place at the Pennsylvania Convention Center in Philadelphia, PA from November 13th through the 15th. The Denver Roller Dolls pioneered the "slow derby" style of play, utilizing slow and stopped packs and backwards skating, which proved effective against most opposition but was unpopular with crowds. They were finally defeated 178–91 in the semi-finals by the Oly Rollers who were regarded as a largely unknown force, though they had gone undefeated through the whole season.

Rocky Mountain Rollergirls had unexpectedly sailed through their qualifying tournament, and beat Philly Roller Girls in an overtime jam in their quarter final, later losing to defending champions Texas Rollergirls 139–82 in the semi-final. The semi-final saw Rocky Mountain skater DeRanged ejected from the tournament after apparently punching Angie-Christ from Texas.

Denver defeated Rocky 151–103 in the third place bout, greatly aided by forty-four points to nil scored in the later section of the first half.

Oly dominated Texas in the championship bout, taking the title 178–100 and being named the 2009 WFTDA Champions.

Date	Winner	Score	Runner-Up
November 13	Boston Derby Dames	104 - 98	Mad Rollin' Dolls
November 13	Rocky Mountain Rollergirls	239 - 46	Houston Roller Derby
November 13	Denver Roller Dolls	175 - 89	Kansas City Roller Warriors
November 13	Gotham Girls Roller Derby	187 - 38	Detroit Derby Girls
November 14	Texas Rollergirls	111 - 72	Boston Derby Dames
November 14	Rocky Mountain Rollergirls	128 - 121	Philly Roller Girls
November 14	Denver Roller Dolls	157 - 125	Windy City Rollers
November 14	Oly Rollers	136 - 105	Gotham Girls Roller Derby
November 14	Texas Rollergirls	139 - 82	Rocky Mountain Rollergirls
November 14	Oly Rollers	178 - 91	Denver Roller Dolls
November 15	Denver Roller Dolls	151 - 103	Rocky Mountain Rollergirls
November 15	Oly Rollers	178 - 100	Texas Rollergirls

=== 2010 Uproar on the Lakeshore ===
Uproar on the Lakeshore took place in Chicago, IL at the University of Illinois-Chicago Pavilion from November 5th through the 7th of 2010. The final was particularly hard-fought. The Oly Rollers built up a half-time lead, 84 points to the Rocky Mountain Rollergirls' 49, principally due to Atomatrix's power jams. Although she ultimately scored 101 points for Oly, Rocky Mountain were able to fight back in the second half. With one jam remaining, Oly retained an eight-point lead, but, jamming for the third time in a row, Rocky Mountain's Frida Beater scored nine unopposed points before calling off the jam, to secure a win by a single point.

Date	Winner	Score	Runner-Up
November 5	Texas Rollergirls	72 - 59	B.ay A.rea D.erby Girls
November 5	Charm City Roller Girls	249 - 118	Minnesota RollerGirls
November 5	Philly Roller Girls	213 - 53	Mad Rollin' Dolls
November 5	Oly Rollers	214 - 53	Nashville Rollergirls
November 6	Gotham Girls Roller Derby	151 - 52	Texas Rollergirls
November 6	Rocky Mountain Rollergirls	165 - 103	Charm City Roller Girls
November 6	Philly Roller Girls	147 - 126	Kansas City Roller Warriors
November 6	Oly Rollers	178 - 76	Windy City Rollers
November 6	Rocky Mountain Rollergirls	113 - 79	Gotham Girls Roller Derby
November 6	Oly Rollers	106 - 81	Philly Roller Girls
November 7	Gotham Girls Roller Derby	162 - 51	Philly Roller Girls
November 7	Rocky Mountain Rollergirls	147 - 146	Oly Rollers

=== 2011 Continental Divide and Conquer ===
The 2011 WFTDA championship tournament, Continental Divide and Conquer, was held at the 1STBANK Center in Broomfield, Colorado hosted by the Denver Derby Dolls. Gotham Girls Roller Derby became the first two-time champion, having previously won in 2008.

Date	Winner	Score	Runner-Up
November 11	Minnesota Rollergirls	160 - 121	Charm City Roller Girls
November 11	Rocky Mountain Rollergirls	198 - 58	Nashville Rollergirls
November 11	Kansas City Roller Warriors	143 - 135	Rose City Rollers
November 11	Philly Roller Girls	225 - 68	Naptown Roller Girls
November 12	Texas Rollergirls	141 - 108	Minnesota Rollergirls
November 12	Gotham Girls Roller Derby	187 - 134	Rocky Mountain Rollergirls
November 12	Kansas City Roller Warriors	112 - 95	Windy City Rollers
November 12	Oly Rollers	181 - 95	Philly Roller Girls
November 12	Gotham Girls Roller Derby	195 - 113	Texas Rollergirls
November 12	Oly Rollers	124 - 104	Kansas City Roller Warriors
November 13	Texas Rollergirls	136 - 112	Kansas City Roller Warriors
November 13	Gotham Girls Roller Derby	140 - 97	Oly Rollers

=== 2012 Grits and Glory ===
The 2012 Grits and Glory WFTDA Championships were held from November 2-4 in Atlanta, hosted by the Atlanta Rollergirls. Gotham Girls Roller Derby dominated the title again this year, taking the championship for the third time overall and for the second year in a row.

Date	Winner	Score	Runner-Up
November 2	Denver Roller Dolls	268 - 141	Charm City Roller Girls
November 2	Minnesota Rollergirls	244 - 148	Kansas City Roller Warriors
November 2	B.ay A.rea D.erby Girls	169 - 119	Philly Roller Girls
November 2	Naptown Roller Girls	169 - 153	Atlanta Rollergirls
November 3	Texas Rollergirls	216 - 161	B.ay A.rea D.erby Girls
November 3	Oly Rollers	218 - 125	Minnesota Rollergirls
November 3	Denver Roller Dolls	212 - 130	Windy City Rollers
November 3	Gotham Girls Roller Derby	316 - 111	Naptown Roller Girls
November 3	Oly Rollers	224 - 147	Texas Rollergirls
November 3	Gotham Girls Roller Derby	221 - 120	Denver Roller Dolls
November 4	Denver Roller Dolls	210 - 199	Texas Rollergirls
November 4	Gotham Girls Roller Derby	233 - 130	Oly Rollers

=== 2013 WFTDA Championships ===
The 2013 championship tournament was held from November 8-10 in Milwaukee, Wisconsin at the U.S. Cellular Arena, hosted by the Brewcity Bruisers. Gotham Girls Roller Derby won the title for the third consecutive year. In the Gotham Girls vs. Ohio Roller Girls bout, Gotham scored over 500 points.

This was also the first Champs to declare different divisions' champions, with Jet City Rollergirls winning the Division 2 title.

Date	Division	Winner	Score	Runner-Up
November 8	D1	Atlanta Rollergirls	184 - 169	London Rollergirls
November 8	D1	Angel City Derby Girls	228 - 198	Rocky Mountain Rollergirls
November 8	D1	Ohio Roller Girls	230 - 212	Rat City Rollergirls
November 8	D1	Windy City Rollers	221 - 174	Philly Roller Girls
November 9	D1	Texas Rollergirls	227 - 134	Atlanta Rollergirls
November 9	D1	Denver Roller Dolls	2000 - 125	Angel City Derby Girls
November 9	D1	Gotham Girls Roller Derby	509 - 64	Ohio Roller Girls
November 9	D1	B.ay A.rea D.erby Girls	230 - 135	Windy City Rollers
November 9	D1	Texas Rollergirls	302 - 129	Denver Roller Dolls
November 9	D1	Gotham Girls Roller Derby	174 - 125	B.ay A.rea D.erby Girls
November 10	D2	Blue Ridge Rollergirls	215 - 188	Sac City Rollers
November 10	D2	Jet City Rollergirls	195 - 194	Santa Cruz Derby Girls
November 10	D1	B.ay A.rea D.erby Girls	224 - 174	Denver Roller Dolls
November 10	D1	Gotham Girls Roller Derby	199 - 173	Texas Rollergirls

=== 2014 WFTDA Championships ===
Nashville Rollergirls hosted the 2014 WFTDA Championships in Nashville, Tennessee at the Nashville Municipal Auditorium. The tournament was held from October 31 to November 2.

Gotham Girls Roller Derby defended their title, claiming their fourth consecutive championship, following a regular season record of 6-0.

The Division 2 championship was won by Detroit Derby Girls.

Date	Division	Winner	Score	Runner-Up
October 31	D1	Denver Roller Dolls	148 - 139	Philly Roller Girls
October 31	D1	Windy City Rollers	214 - 192	Rocky Mountain Rollergirls
October 31	D1	Texas Rollergirls	192 - 140	Angel City Derby Girls
October 31	D1	Victorian Roller Derby League	169 - 122	Minnesota RollerGirls
November 1	D1	B.ay A.rea D.erby Girls	169 - 130	Denver Roller Dolls
November 1	D1	Rose City Rollers	251 - 133	Windy City Rollers
November 1	D1	Gotham Girls Roller Derby	163 - 117	Texas Rollergirls
November 1	D1	London Rollergirls	173 - 142	Victorian Roller Derby League
November 1	D1	Rose City Rollers	187 - 116	B.ay A.rea D.erby Girls
November 1	D1	Gotham Girls Roller Derby	280 - 94	London Rollergirls
November 2	D2	Bear City Roller Derby	164 - 163	Fabulous Sin City Rollergirls
November 2	D2	Detroit Derby Girls	244 - 125	Rideau Valley Roller Girls
November 2	D1	B.ay A.rea D.erby Girls	238 - 148	London Rollergirls
November 2	D1	Gotham Girls Roller Derby	147 - 144	Rose City Rollers

=== 2015 WFTDA Championships ===
The 2015 WFTDA Championships were held in Saint Paul, Minnesota from November 6-8 and hosted by the Minnesota Rollergirls at Roy Wilkins Auditorium.

Upsetting Gotham Girls Roller Derby, the Rose City Rollers won their WFTDA championship.

The Division 2 championship title was taken by Sacred City Derby Girls in a hard-fought bout versus the Nashville Rollergirls.

Date	Division	Winner	Score	Runner-Up
November 6	D1	Nashville Rollergirls	232 - 91	Demolition City Roller Derby
November 6	D2	Sacred City Derby Girls	242 - 160	Kansas City Roller Warriors
November 6	D1	Angel City Derby Girls	161 - 101	Rat City Rollergirls
November 6	D1	B.ay A.rea D.erby Girls	179 - 148	Denver Roller Derby
November 6	D1	Jacksonville RollerGirls	149 - 141	Arch Rival Roller Girls
November 6	D1	Texas Rollergirls	185 - 173	Minnesota RollerGirls
November 7	D1	London Rollergirls	158 - 126	Angel City Derby Girls
November 7	D1	Rose City Rollers	191 - 145	B.ay A.rea D.erby Girls
November 7	D1	Gotham Girls Roller Derby	299 - 114	Jacksonville RollerGirls
November 7	D1	Victorian Roller Derby League	181 - 85	Texas Rollergirls
November 7	D1	Rose City Rollers	166 - 154	London Rollergirls
November 7	D1	Gotham Girls Roller Derby	143 - 141	Victorian Roller Derby League
November 8	D2	Demolition City Roller Derby	149 - 139	Kansas City Roller Warriors
November 8	D2	Sacred City Derby Girls	211 - 163	Nashville Rollergirls
November 8	D1	Victorian Roller Derby League	122 - 99	London Rollergirls
November 8	D1	Rose City Rollers	206 - 195	Gotham Girls Roller Derby

=== 2016 WFTDA Championships ===
The championship tournament was held at Veterans Memorial Coliseum in Portland, Oregon from November 4-6, with defending champions Rose City Rollers hosting the event. Rose City successfully defended their title and took home the championship for the second year in a row, with Blue Ridge Rollergirls taking the Division 2 title.

Date	Division	Winner	Score	Runner-Up
November 4	D2	Brandywine Roller Derby	205 - 200	Charlottesville Derby Dames
November 4	D2	Blue Ridge Rollergirls	225 - 183	Calgary Roller Derby Association
November 4	D1	Arch Rival Roller Derby	177 - 165	Denver Roller Derby
November 4	D1	Angel City Derby Girls	217 - 116	Montreal Roller Derby
November 4	D1	Jacksonville RollerGirls	207 - 158	Minnesota RollerGirls
November 4	D1	Texas Rollergirls	238 - 50	Rat City Rollergirls
November 5	D1	London Rollergirls	197 - 94	Arch Rival Roller Derby
November 5	D1	Gotham Girls Roller Derby	197 - 168	Angel City Derby Girls
November 5	D1	Victorian Roller Derby League	231 - 98	Jacksonville RollerGirls
November 5	D1	Rose City Rollers	186 - 172	Texas Rollergirls
November 5	D1	Gotham Girls Roller Derby	189 - 163	London Rollergirls
November 5	D1	Rose City Rollers	155 - 152	Victorian Roller Derby League
November 6	D2	Calgary Roller Derby Association	252 - 197	Charlottesville Derby Dames
November 6	D2	Blue Ridge Rollergirls	257 - 188	Brandywine Roller Derby
November 6	D1	Victorian Roller Derby League	198 - 108	London Rollergirls
November 6	D1	Rose City Rollers	186 - 166	Gotham Girls Roller Derby

=== 2017 WFTDA Championships ===
The 2017 WFTDA Championships were held November 3-5 at the Liacouras Center in Philadelphia, with Philly Roller Derby hosting.

Victorian Roller Derby League took home their first championship title, having upset Rose City Rollers from their two-time championship.

Date	Winner	Score	Runner-Up
November 3	Montreal Roller Derby	133 - 129	Crime City Rollers
November 3	Angel City Derby	281 - 144	Minnesota RollerGirls
November 3	Arch Rival Roller Derby	225 - 82	London Rollergirls
November 3	Texas Rollergirls	254 - 128	Rat City Roller Derby
November 3	Victorian Roller Derby League	253 - 99	Montreal Roller Derby
November 3	Denver Roller Derby	196 - 165	Angel City Derby
November 4	Gotham Girls Roller Derby	148 - 145	Texas Rollergirls
November 4	Rose City Rollers	237 - 109	Arch Rival Roller Derby
November 4	London Rollergirls	231 - 152	Montreal Roller Derby
November 4	Angel City Derby	219 - 94	Rat City Roller Derby
November 4	Victorian Roller Derby League	287 - 65	Denver Roller Derby
November 4	Rose City Rollers	159 - 113	Gotham Girls Roller Derby
November 5	Texas Rollergirls	280 - 153	Minnesota RollerGirls
November 5	Arch Rival Roller Derby	220 - 160	Crime City Rollers
November 5	Gotham Girls Roller Derby	178 - 128	Denver Roller Derby
November 5	Victorian Roller Derby League	180 - 101	Rose City Rollers

=== 2018 WFTDA Championships ===
2018's WFTDA championships were held at the Lakefront Arena in New Orleans from November 9-11 hosted by Big Easy Rollergirls.

With Victorian Roller Derby League holding the 2017 title and two-time winners Rose City Rollers as the second seed, the tournament was intense, and ended with Rose City taking home their third championship, and with Victoria finishing in second place.

Date	Winner	Score	Runner-Up
November 9	Montreal Roller Derby	184 - 180	Crime City Rollers
November 9	Angel City Derby	248 - 85	Jacksonville Roller Derby
November 9	Gotham Girls Roller Derby	143 - 79	Texas Rollergirls
November 9	Denver Roller Derby	204 - 134	Arch Rival Roller Derby
November 9	Rose City Rollers	222 - 107	Montreal Roller Derby
November 9	Victorian Roller Derby League	170 - 95	Angel City Derby
November 10	Crime City Rollers	173 - 160	Jacksonville Roller Derby
November 10	Arch Rival Roller Derby	122 - 92	Texas Rollergirls
November 10	Angel City Derby	199 - 118	Montreal Roller Derby
November 10	Rose City Rollers	150 - 124	Gotham Girls Roller Derby
November 10	Victorian Roller Derby League	202 - 129	Denver Roller Derby
November 11	Gotham Girls Roller Derby	164 - 151	Denver Roller Derby
November 11	Rose City Rollers	144 - 121	Victorian Roller Derby League

=== 2019 WFTDA Championships ===
2019 marked the first WFTDA championships to be held outside of the United States with the tournament taking place at Complexe sportif Claude-Robillard in Montreal, Canada and hosted by Montreal Roller Derby. The tournament took place from November 15-17.

Rose City Rollers won the Hydra Trophy for the fourth time.

This tournament featured a exhibition game between two borderless teams, at the time a new concept for the roller derby community. Team Indigenous Roller Derby and Jewish Roller Derby played Saturday morning in a bout called "We Are Nation: A Game Without Borders."

Date	Winner	Score	Runner-Up
November 15	Philly Roller Derby	136 - 114	Texas Rollergirls
November 15	Montreal Roller Derby	217 - 124	2x4 Roller Derby
November 15	Arch Rival Roller Derby	127 - 122	Denver Roller Derby
November 15	Victorian Roller Derby League	169 - 88	Angel City Derby
November 15	Rose City Rollers	205 - 50	Philly Roller Derby
November 15	Gotham Girls Roller Derby	170 - 90	Montreal Roller Derby
November 15	Team Indigenous Roller Derby	138 - 119	Jewish Roller Derby
November 16	Texas Rollergirls	139 - 92	2x4 Roller Derby
November 16	Denver Roller Derby	205 - 116	Angel City Derby
November 16	Gotham Girls Roller Derby	109 - 103	Victorian Roller Derby League
November 16	Rose City Rollers	155 - 95	Arch Rival Roller Derby
November 17	Montreal Roller Derby	135 - 115	Philly Roller Derby
November 17	Victorian Roller Derby League	119 - 107	Arch Rival Roller Derby
November 17	Rose City Rollers	145 - 65	Gotham Girls Roller Derby

=== 2020 ===
The 2020 International WFTDA Championships were canceled in May due to the COVID-19 pandemic, joining the previously-announced cancellation of the season's Playoffs and Continental Cups.

=== 2024 WFTDA Championships ===
After a five-year hiatus while the roller derby community reestablished itself following the onset of the pandemic, the 2024 WFTDA Championships took place from November 1-3, 2024 at Veterans Memorial Coliseum in Portland, Oregon. Rose City took the championship in their home city for the second time and fifth title overall.

Date	Winner	Score	Runner-Up
November 1	Gotham All Stars	171 - 132	Jacksonville New Jax City
November 1	Angel City Hollywood Scarlets	171 - 127	Nothing Toulouse
November 1	Crime City Rollers	248 - 66	Adelaide Ads
November 1	VRDL All Stars	242 - 64	Nantes Les Duch.esse.s
November 1	Montreal New Skids on the Block	238 - 70	Atlanta Dirty South Derby
November 1	Rose City Wheels of Justice	241 - 30	Gotham All Stars
November 2	VRDL All Stars	179 - 122	Montreal New Skids on the Block
November 2	Arch Rival All Stars	151 - 130	Angel City Hollywood Scarlets
November 2	Denver Mile High Club	191 - 138	Crime City Rollers
November 2	Rose City Wheels of Justice	192 - 84	VRDL All Stars
November 2	Arch Rival All Stars	156 - 83	Denver Mile High Club
November 3	Rose City Wheels of Justice	141 - 104	Arch Rival All Stars

=== 2026 WFTDA Championships ===
The 2026 WFTDA Championships took place from October 15-18 in Malmö, Sweden hosted by Crime City Rollers. This was the first WFTDA championship to take place in Europe and the first four-day WFTDA championship tournament.
