= WFTDA Western Regional Tournament =

- 2007–2012

Tournament information
- Location: Various
- Month played: September
- Established: 2007
- Format: Knockout

Current champion
- Oly Rollers

The WFTDA Western Regional Tournament or WFTDA West Region Playoffs was one of four roller derby qualifying tournaments for the WFTDA Championships.

The Tournament was organised by the Women's Flat Track Derby Association (WFTDA). Full WFTDA members in the Western Region members were eligible for ranking, and the top ten leagues would qualify for the Western Regional Tournament, with the top three finalists qualifying for the Championships. Together, the four qualifying tournaments and Championships were termed the "Big 5". Starting with the 2013 WFTDA season, WFTDA's regions were discontinued in favor of an overall-rankings based system, and a new playoff format was created.

== Championships ==
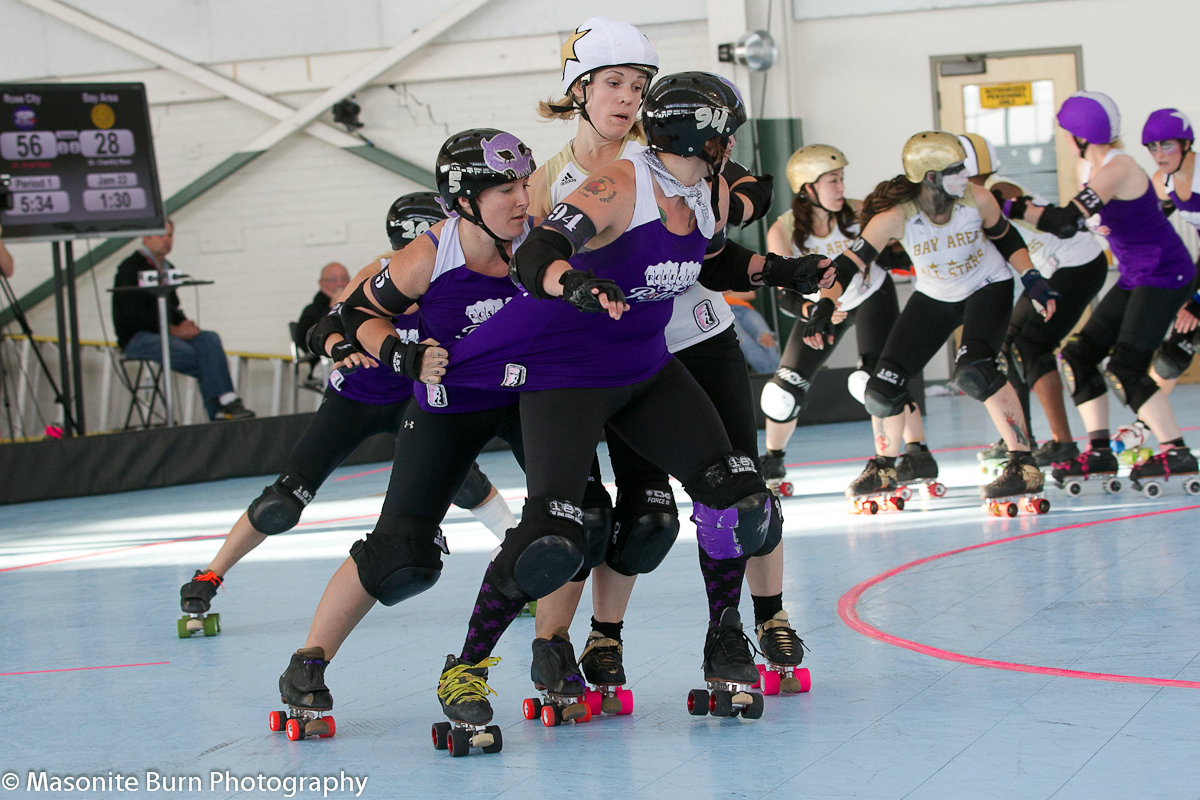
Bay Area take on Rose City at the 2012 Tournament

| Year | Date | Name | Venue | Champion | Second | Third |
|---|---|---|---|---|---|---|
| 2007 | 16-18 February | Dust Devil | Tucson, Arizona | Rat City Rollergirls | Tucson Roller Derby | Texas Rollergirls |
| 2008 | 1-3 October | Battle Royale | Houston, Texas | Texas Rollergirls | B.ay A.rea D.erby Girls | Rat City Rollergirls |
| 2009 | 11-13 September | Derby on the Rocks | Denver, Colorado | Oly Rollers | Rocky Mountain Rollergirls | Denver Roller Dolls |
| 2010 | 24-26 September | Rollin' on the River | Sacramento, California | Rocky Mountain Rollergirls | Oly Rollers | B.ay A.rea D.erby Girls |
| 2011 | 16-18 September | Bridgetown Brawl | Portland, Oregon | Oly Rollers | Rocky Mountain Rollergirls | Rose City Rollers |
| 2012 | 21-23 September | Bay of Reckoning | Oakland, California | Oly Rollers | Denver Roller Dolls | B.ay A.rea D.erby Girls |

== 2007 Dust Devil ==
On February 16, 2007, the Rat City Rollergirls beat Tucson Roller Derby 83–72 in the finals of the Western Regional Tournament, the Dust Devil, held in Tucson, Arizona. The previous year, Tucson Roller Derby had hosted the first Dust Devil tournament, considered the first national roller derby tournament, placing second.

== 2008 Battle Royale ==
On October 3, 2008, the Texas Rollergirls Texecutioners beat the B.ay A.rea D.erby Girls BAD Girls 135–59 in the championship bout. Rat City Rollergirls beat the Duke City Derby Muñecas Muertas 158–95 in the consolation bout to take third place.

== 2009 Derby On the Rocks Tournament ==
On October 4, 2009, the Oly Rollers' Cosa Nostra Donnas defeated the Rocky Mountain Rollergirls' 5280 Fight Club 119–64 in the West championship bout. The Denver Roller Dolls' Mile High Club beat the Rat City Rollergirls 172–94 to place third.
