= Women's Flat Track Derby Association Division 1 =

International roller derby division

The Women's Flat Track Derby Association Division 1 (WFTDA Division 1) is the highest level of play in women's flat track roller derby.

== Organisation ==
The division consists of the 36 highest-ranked members of the Women's Flat Track Derby Association, based on performance over the previous year, who compete across three Playoff tournaments with 12 teams at each Playoff.

Historically, the WFTDA instead operated four regions: East, North Central, South Central and West. At the start of 2013, these were redivided into three divisions, each operating worldwide. However, foreseeing continued growth in membership, the WFTDA stated that future developments were likely to include new regional structures alongside the divisional system. Through 2016, under the original divisional system, Division 1 comprised the top 40 eligible teams, with the next 20 eligible teams qualifying for Division 2 Playoffs.

Teams in Division 1 play in bouts through the year, aiming to qualify for one of the three Division 1 Playoffs. Starting with 2015, sanctioned-game play requirements were modified to be simply any 4 WFTDA-sanctioned games played between December 1 of the previous calendar year and June 30, without a requirement to play a certain number of games against similarly-ranked opponents. Teams which do not play a minimum number of sanctioned bouts are not permitted to compete at the Playoffs. The next 16-ranked teams as of June of the calendar year remain eligible for Division 2 Playoffs.

== Member leagues ==
The 2017 Division 1 member list was announced by the WFTDA on July 14. Two teams that were in the top 36 on June 30 - #23 Adelaide Roller Derby of Adelaide, Australia, and #26 Team United Women's Roller Derby of Des Moines, Iowa - did not meet gameplay requirements to qualify for WFTDA Playoffs. Two eligible leagues, #31 Rocky Mountain Rollergirls of Denver, Colorado and #33 Blue Ridge Rollergirls of Asheville, North Carolina both declined, and this allowed teams as low as #40 Wasatch Roller Derby to participate. As a result, the table below features 38 teams, including the two that declined participating in the 2017 Division 1 Playoffs.

League	City	Country	Year(s) of membership
Victorian Roller Derby League (VRDL)	A Coruña	Spain	2018
2×4 Roller Derby	Buenos Aires	Argentina	2017
Angel City Derby Girls	Los Angeles, CA	United States	2013, 2014, 2015, 2016, 2017
Ann Arbor Roller Derby	Ann Arbor, MI	United States	2016, 2017
Arch Rival Roller Derby	St. Louis, MO	United States	2013, 2014, 2015, 2016, 2017
Arizona Roller Derby	Phoenix, AZ	United States	2013, 2015, 2016, 2017
Atlanta Rollergirls	Atlanta, GA	United States	2013, 2014, 2015, 2016, 2017
Bay Area Derby	Oakland, CA	United States	2013, 2014, 2015, 2016, 2017
Blue Ridge Rollergirls	Asheville, NC	United States	2017 (Note: team declined invitation to Playoffs this year)
Calgary Roller Derby Association	Calgary, AB	Canada	2017
Charlottesville Derby Dames	Charlottesville, VA	United States	2015, 2017
Charm City Roller Girls	Baltimore, MD	United States	2013, 2014, 2015, 2017
Crime City Rollers	Malmö	Sweden	2015, 2016, 2017
Dallas Derby Devils	Dallas, TX	United States	2015, 2016, 2017
Denver Roller Derby	Denver, CO	United States	2013, 2014, 2015, 2016, 2017
Detroit Roller Derby	Detroit, MI	United States	2013, 2014, 2015, 2016, 2017
Gotham Girls Roller Derby	New York, NY	United States	2013, 2014, 2015, 2016, 2017
Helsinki Roller Derby	Helsinki	Finland	2015, 2016, 2017
Houston Roller Derby	Houston, TX	United States	2013, 2014, 2017
Jacksonville RollerGirls	Jacksonville, FL	United States	2013, 2014, 2015, 2016, 2017
Kallio Rolling Rainbow	Helsinki	Finland	2016, 2017
London Rollergirls	London	England	2013, 2014, 2015, 2016, 2017
Mad Rollin' Dolls	Madison, WI	United States	2013, 2014, 2015, 2016, 2017
Minnesota RollerGirls	Saint Paul, MN	United States	2013, 2014, 2015, 2016, 2017
Montreal Roller Derby	Montreal, QC	Canada	2013, 2014, 2015, 2016, 2017
Philly Roller Derby	Philadelphia, PA	United States	2013, 2014, 2015, 2016, 2017
Queen City Roller Girls	Buffalo, NY	United States	2015, 2016, 2017
Rainy City Roller Derby	Manchester	England	2016, 2017
Rat City Roller Derby	Seattle, WA	United States	2013, 2014, 2015, 2016, 2017
Rocky Mountain Rollergirls	Denver, CO	United States	2013, 2014, 2015, 2016, 2017
Rose City Rollers	Portland, OR	United States	2013, 2014, 2015, 2016, 2017
Santa Cruz Derby Girls	Santa Cruz, CA	United States	2014, 2016, 2017
Stockholm Roller Derby	Stockholm	Sweden	2015, 2016, 2017
Tampa Roller Derby	Tampa, FL	United States	2013, 2014, 2015, 2016, 2017
Terminal City Rollergirls	Vancouver, BC	Canada	2014, 2015, 2016, 2017
Texas Rollergirls	Austin, TX	United States	2013, 2014, 2015, 2016, 2017
Victorian Roller Derby League	Melbourne, VIC	Australia	2013, 2014, 2015, 2016, 2017
Wasatch Roller Derby	Salt Lake City, UT	United States	2013, 2014, 2017
Windy City Rollers	Chicago, IL	United States	2013, 2014, 2015, 2016, 2017

=== Past members ===
The initial Division 1 membership list for 2013 was based upon the team's rankings as of June 30, 2012. The 2014 Division 1 membership list was announced on 9 December 2013, based on the overall rankings that took effect as of 30 November 2013. The same methodology was employed in 2014, and membership of Division 1 that year mostly comprised teams from the United States, but also Australia, Canada and the United Kingdom. Eight teams which were original members dropped out of Division 1 membership at the conclusion of the 2013 WFTDA season. Since then, additional teams have dropped out of Division 1.

Starting in 2015, division assignments were announced based on June 30 rankings, and in-division gameplay requirements were removed. As the annual June 30 rankings now determines Playoff position, and as the divisional definition is only used for playoff assignments, the rankings as of June 30, 2016 determine Division 1 membership. Membership includes all teams that are eligible for Division 1 Playoffs, even if a team declines their invitation to Playoffs, as well as teams ranked beyond the usual Division 1 cutoff who are invited due to higher-ranked teams not competing. Teams that do not meet minimum gameplay requirements are ineligible to receive a Playoffs invitation and therefore not included as Division 1 members. In 2016 Division 1 also included members from Finland and Sweden.

League	City	Country	Year(s) of membership	Current status
Bleeding Heartland Rollergirls	Bloomington, IN	United States	2014	out of Playoffs
Boston Roller Derby	Boston, MA	United States	2013, 2014, 2015, 2016	Division 2
Brewcity Bruisers	Milwaukee, WI	United States	2013	out of Playoffs
Carolina Rollergirls	Raleigh, NC	United States	2013	out of Playoffs
Chicago Outfit Roller Derby	Chicago, IL	United States	2013	out of Playoffs
Cincinnati Rollergirls	Cincinnati, OH	United States	2013, 2014	out of Playoffs
DC Rollergirls	Washington, DC	United States	2013	out of Playoffs
Dutchland Rollers	Lancaster, PA	United States	2013	out of Playoffs
Glasgow Roller Derby	Glasgow	Scotland	2015	out of Playoffs
Jet City Rollergirls	Everett, WA	United States	2014	Division 2
Kansas City Roller Warriors	Kansas City, MO	United States	2013, 2014	out of Playoffs
Naptown Roller Derby	Indianapolis, IN	United States	2013, 2014, 2016	Division 2
Nashville Rollergirls	Nashville, TN	United States	2013, 2014	out of Playoffs
New Hampshire Roller Derby	Nashua, NH	United States	2014	out of Playoffs
No Coast Derby Girls	Lincoln, NE	United States	2013, 2014, 2015, 2016	Division 2
Ohio Roller Derby	Columbus, OH	United States	2013, 2014, 2015, 2016	Division 2
Oklahoma Victory Dolls	Oklahoma City, OK	United States	2014	Division 2
Oly Rollers	Olympia, WA	United States	2013, 2014	inactive in WFTDA play (Note: Oly was a Division 1 team in both 2013 and 2014, however they did not meet their sanctioned game requirements for Playoffs, and have not since.)
Omaha Rollergirls	Omaha, NE	United States	2013	out of Playoffs
Pikes Peak Derby Dames	Colorado Springs, CO	United States	2015	out of Playoffs
Rideau Valley Roller Girls	Ottawa, ON	Canada	2015	out of Playoffs (Note: Rideau Valley merged with Capital City Derby Dolls in January 2018, and they rebranded as Ottawa Valley Roller Derby.)
Sacred City Derby Girls	Sacramento, CA	United States	2013, 2014, 2016	out of Playoffs (Note: Sacred City merged with Sac City Rollers in late 2017, and they rebranded as Sacramento Roller Derby in January 2018.)
Steel City Roller Derby	Pittsburgh, PA	United States	2013, 2014, 2015, 2016	out of Playoffs
Sun State Roller Girls	Brisbane, QLD	Australia	2013, 2014, 2015, 2016	Division 2
Tallahassee Rollergirls	Tallahassee, FL	United States	2013	out of Playoffs
Team United Women's Roller Derby	Des Moines, IA	United States	2015, 2016	out of Playoffs
Toronto Roller Derby	Toronto, ON	Canada	2014, 2015	out of Playoffs
Tri-City Roller Derby	Kitchener-Waterloo, ON	Canada	2015	out of Playoffs

== Division 1 Playoffs ==
Prior to 2015, teams in Division 1 played in bouts through the year, aiming to qualify for one of the four Division 1 Playoffs. Each Playoff includes ten teams. However, Division 1 teams are not guaranteed a playoff spot, as teams in lower divisions can qualify by being ranked among the top forty WFTDA members. Additionally, teams which do not play a minimum number of sanctioned bouts are not permitted to compete at the Playoffs, with Division 1 teams required to play at least 4 WFTDA-sanctioned bouts following the previous year's championship and the current year's June 30, with at least 3 of those being against other D1 teams.

After 2015, in-division gameplay requirements for playoff consideration were dropped, leaving the June 30 rankings as the sole determinant of division eligibility.

=== 2013 Playoffs ===
All four of the 2013 Playoffs were played in the United States. The top three teams from each Playoff qualify for the WFTDA Championships, and the London Rollergirls became the first ever non-U.S. team to achieve this. The Oly Rollers, who on June 30, 2013 were ranked 3rd overall, chose not to compete in the required minimum sanctioned games, with the full knowledge they would miss the WFTDA tournaments as a result. Oly still remains a member of the WFTDA and could have qualified for 2014 WFTDA playoffs if they met their requirements.

Location	Dates	Champions	Second	Third
Fort Wayne, IN	6-8 September 2013	Denver Roller Dolls	Ohio Rollergirls	London Rollergirls
Richmond, VA	13-15 September 2013	Texas Rollergirls	Philly Roller Girls	Angel City Derby Girls
Asheville, NC	20-22 September 2013	Gotham Girls Roller Derby	Rocky Mountain Rollergirls	Windy City Rollers
Salem, OR	27-29 September 2013	B.ay A.rea D.erby Girls	Atlanta Rollergirls	Rat City Rollergirls

=== 2014 Playoffs ===
All four of the 2014 Playoff tournaments were again played in the United States, and again the top three teams from each tournament qualified for the 2014 WFTDA Championships.

Location	Dates	Champions	Second	Third
Sacramento, CA	5-7 September 2014	Gotham Girls Roller Derby	Denver Roller Dolls	Minnesota Rollergirls
Evansville, IN	19-21 September 2014	London Rollergirls	Windy City Rollers	Texas Rollergirls
Salt Lake City, UT	26-28 September 2014	B.ay A.rea D.erby Girls	Angel City Derby Girls	Rocky Mountain Rollergirls
Charleston, WV	3-5 October 2014	Rose City Rollers	Victorian Roller Derby League	Philly Roller Girls

=== 2015 Playoffs ===
The same format was used for the 2015 Playoffs.

Location	Dates	Champions	Second	Third
Tucson, AZ	4–6 September 2015	Victorian Roller Derby League	B.ay A.rea D.erby Girls	Arch Rival Roller Girls
Dallas, TX	11–13 September 2015	Rose City Rollers	Texas Rollergirls	Rat City Rollergirls
Jacksonville, FL	18–20 September 2015	London Rollergirls	Jacksonville RollerGirls	Denver Roller Derby
Omaha, NE	2–4 October 2015	Gotham Girls Roller Derby	Angel City Derby Girls	Minnesota RollerGirls

=== 2016 Playoffs ===
The 2016 Division 1 Playoffs followed the same format as previous years, once again distributing the qualifying teams using an S-curve seeding structure. For the first time, two of the Division 1 tournaments were held outside the United States, both in Canada: the first in Montreal, hosted by Montreal Roller Derby, and the second in Vancouver, hosted by Terminal City Rollergirls. Montreal Roller Derby became the first Canadian team to qualify for the Division 1 Championship by placing third at their own tournament in September.

Location	Dates	Champions	Second	Third
Montreal, QC	2–4 September 2016	London Rollergirls	Texas Rollergirls	Montreal Roller Derby
Columbia, SC	9–11 September 2016	Rose City Rollers	Denver Roller Derby	Jacksonville RollerGirls
Vancouver, BC	16–18 September 2016	Victorian Roller Derby League	Angel City Derby Girls	Rat City Rollergirls
Madison, WI	23–25 September 2016	Gotham Girls Roller Derby	Arch Rival Roller Derby	Minnesota RollerGirls

=== 2017 Playoffs ===
A new structure was announced for 2017, whereby Division 1 membership was reduced to the top 36 eligible teams, to be spread over three Playoff tournaments with 12 teams each; the top four teams from each playoff will advance to Championships. The 2017 Division 1 Playoffs were held in Seattle, Washington September 1–3, Malmö, Sweden September 8–10, and Dallas, Texas September 22–24, feeding into the 2017 Championships in Philadelphia. The participating teams were announced on July 14, 2017.

Location	Dates	Champions	Second	Third	Fourth
Seattle, WA	1–3 September 2017	Rose City Rollers	Angel City Derby Girls	Montreal Roller Derby	Rat City Rollergirls
Malmö, SWE	8–10 September 2017	Gotham Girls Roller Derby	Denver Roller Derby	London Rollergirls	Crime City Rollers
Dallas, TX	22–24 September 2017	Victorian Roller Derby League	Texas Rollergirls	Arch Rival Roller Derby	Minnesota RollerGirls
