= Tucson Roller Derby =

Roller derby league

- Metro area: Tucson, Arizona
- Country: United States
- Founded: 2003
- Teams: Javelina Havoc
- Track type: Flat
- Affiliations: WFTDA
- Org. type: 501(c)(3) NPO
- Website: TucsonRollerDerby.org

Tucson Roller Derby (TRD) is a women's flat track roller derby league located in Tucson, Arizona. Founded in late 2003, Tucson Roller Derby is a skater-run non-profit organization and hosts monthly roller derby competitions showcasing bouts involving the various teams in the league, often against other leagues in Arizona, and also teams from national derby leagues. A founding member of the Women's Flat Track Derby Association (WFTDA), Tucson was the host league for the first WFTDA Championships in 2006.

== History and league structure ==
Initially formed as the Tucson extension of the Phoenix-based Arizona Roller Derby, TRD was founded in December 2003 by Kim Kysar (a.k.a. Kim Sin) when the Tucson skaters, citing geographical and logistical concerns, broke away from the parent league. By 2006 Tucson Roller Derby was averaging 700-800 fans for home events at Bladeworld, since renamed the Tucson Indoor Sports Center.

Tucson hosted the first-ever WFTDA Championships over the weekend of February 24–26, 2006. Dubbed the "Dust Devil", the event hosted 20 WFTDA leagues from around the United States in a tournament to determine the nation's first-ever WFTDA national champion team. Subsequently, TRD was chosen to host the first WFTDA Western Regional Tournament in 2007, also called the Dust Devil. This tournament, featuring members of the WFTDA's West Region, determined the four leagues to head to the Texas Shootout WFTDA Championship in Austin, Texas, where they faced off against the top four teams from the East. TRD still hosts this historical annual tournament, now an invitational tournament without Playoff implications, every spring. TRD hosted a WFTDA Division 1 playoff tournament in September 2015 at the Tucson Convention Center, including WFTDA teams from the United States, Canada, and Australia.

Tucson Roller Derby received their Public Charity status on August 7, 2006, as the first team in the WFTDA to receive a tax deductible status on donations. TRD is a 501(c)(3) nonprofit public charity organization.

=== Teams ===
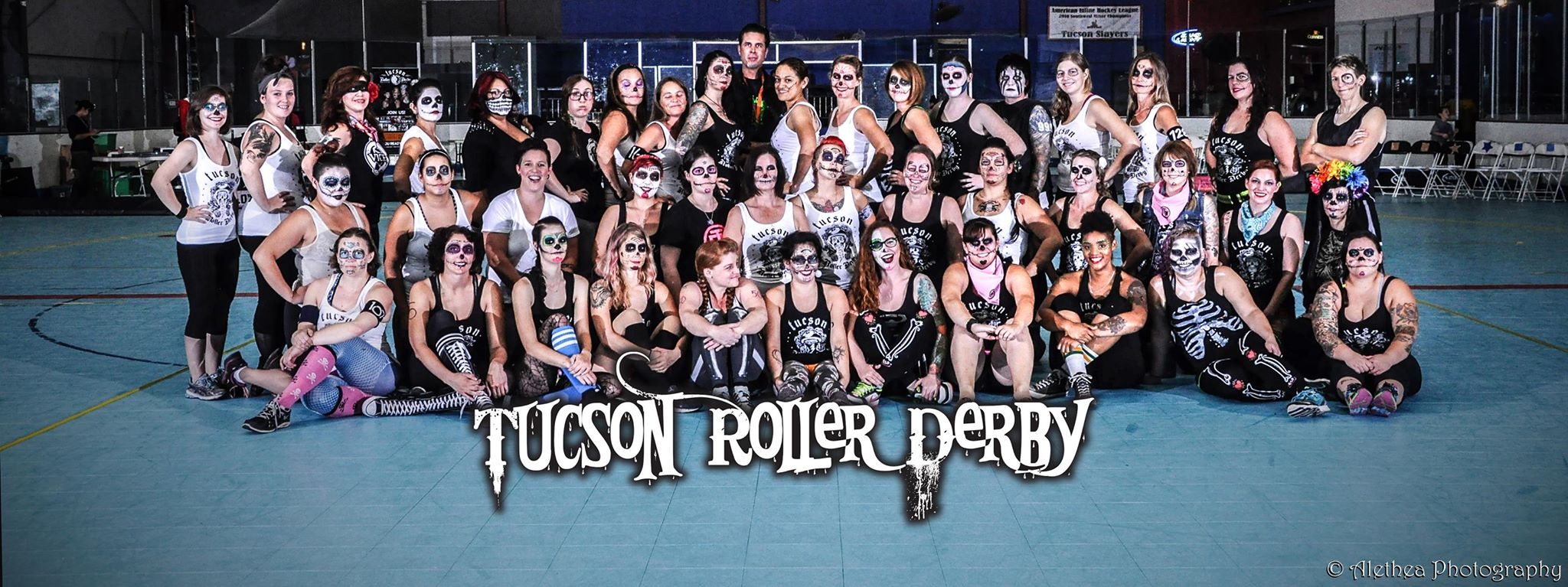
Tucson Roller Derby 2015 photographed by Alethea Photography

At the time of its creation, Tucson Roller Derby consisted of one team, The Furious Truckstop Waitresses (FTW). Tucson Roller Derby had more than doubled in size over the years, adding multiple home teams. The Iron Curtain was added in 2004, the Vice Squad in 2005, and the Copper Queens in 2007. The Furious Truckstop Waitresses were league champions in 2004, 2006 and 2007, and the VICE Squad was the league champion in 2005, 2008 and 2009, the final season Tucson held league-only championships, after the Iron Curtain home team was disbanded after 2009. The Tucson Saddletramps travel team formed in 2004. TRD formed a second travel team in 2012, the Bandoleras. In 2015 the Bandoleras were changed from a travel team into a city-level, new skater, home team. TRD continues to have a "sisterly" relationship with Arizona Roller Derby, often facing off against each other with both their local-season and WFTDA inter-league teams.

In 2017, five teams comprised Tucson Roller Derby. The Vice Squad and the Copper Queens were state-level home teams, the Furious Truckstop Waitresses (FTW) and the Bandoleras were city-level home teams, and the Tucson Saddletramps ere the all-star travel team comprising members of the home teams, and travel for inter-league and interstate challenges at the WFTDA level.

After the 2020 COVID-19 pandemic, Tucson Roller Derby faced a large drop in membership and participation. As a result, all teams were dissolved and a rebranding began. In 2023, a new team was officially created, the Javelina Havoc. Javelina Havoc made its first public WFTDA appearance at the Cosmos Tournament hosted by California Derby Galaxy in Oakland, California that same year. As of 2025, Javelina Havoc remains to the Tucson Roller Derby's only team.

== Arizona State Roller Derby Conference ==
Starting in the 2010-2011 season, Tucson Roller Derby created the first ever statewide conference. All of the home (non-travel) teams in the state that play by WFTDA rules are allowed to enter and participate. Each team plays each other during the regular season, culminating in a two-day State Conference Tournament. Teams can be expected to play up to 4 games during the tournament. The leagues involved in the 2011 and 2012 years were Tucson Roller Derby, Arizona Roller Derby, Dirty Verde Roller Derby, and Northern Arizona Roller Derby. The 2013 season leagues involved were Tucson Roller Derby, Arizona Roller Derby, Northern Arizona Roller Derby. The 2014 season added the High Altitude Roller Derby league into the conference. The Arizona State Roller Derby Conference of 2015 consisted of teams from Tucson Roller Derby, Arizona Roller Derby, Northern Arizona Roller Derby, and High Altitude Roller Derby.

Teams that have competed throughout the years are: The Copper Queens (TRD), The Furious Truckstop Waitresses (TRD), The VICE Squad (TRD), The Bad News Beaters (AZRD), The Surly Gurlies (AZRD), The Brawlarinas (AZRD), The Whiskey ROW-llers (NAZRD), Dirty Verde Roller Derby (DVRD), and Dark City Starlets (HARD).

=== Arizona State Champions ===
2011 The Bad News Beaters (Arizona Roller Derby)
2012 The Bad News Beaters (Arizona Roller Derby)
2013 The Surly Gurlies (Arizona Roller Derby)
2014 The Surly Gurlies (Arizona Roller Derby)
2015 The Copper Queens (Tucson Roller Derby)
2016 The Copper Queens (Tucson Roller Derby)

== WFTDA competition ==
Tucson hosted the first WFTDA Championships in 2006, an invitational tournament at that time, at which they placed second to the Texas Rollergirls. In 2007, Tucson hosted the first WFTDA Western Regional Tournament, again called the "Dust Devil", and finished in second place with an 83-72 loss to Rat City Rollergirls (Seattle). At that year's championships in Austin, Tucson lost their opening round game to Carolina Rollergirls, 80-73. Tucson finished in tenth place at the 2008 Westerns, ninth in 2009, eighth in 2010, tenth in 2011, and did not qualify for the final Western Regional in 2012.

In 2013 the WFTDA restructured playoffs, and under the new divisional model Tucson would have qualified as a Division 2 Playoff team but declined their invitation to participate. In 2014, Tucson was the sixth seed for the Division 2 Playoff in Duluth, but finished in tenth place with a 184-138 loss to Omaha Rollergirls. After missing Playoffs in 2015, Tucson returned to Division 2 Playoffs in 2016 at Wichita with their highest Playoff finish since 2008 at seventh place, secured by a 223-119 victory over Kansas City Roller Warriors. Tucson bettered this result at the Division 2 Playoffs and Championship in 2017 as the second seed in Pittsburgh, finishing in fifth place.

=== Rankings ===
Season	Final ranking	Playoffs	Championship
2006	2 WFTDA	—	2
2007	6 WFTDA	2 W	R1
2008	NR	10 W	DNQ
2009	9 W	9 W	DNQ
2010	9 W	8 W	DNQ
2011	10 W	10 W	DNQ
2012	17 W	DNQ	DNQ
2013	74 WFTDA	DNP	DNQ
2014	65 WFTDA	10 D2	DNQ
2015	63 WFTDA	DNQ	DNQ
2016	43 WFTDA	7 D2	DNQ
2017	42 WFTDA	N/A	5 D2
