= Bay Area Derby =

Roller derby league

- Metro area: San Francisco, CA
- Country: United States
- Founded: 2004
- Teams: All Stars (A Team); Team Gold (B team); Berkeley Resistance; Oakland Outlaws; San Francisco Shevil Dead
- Track type: Flat
- Venue: Palace of Fine Arts; Craneway Pavilion; Fort Mason; Oakland Convention Center; Dry Ice Hockey Arena, 2004-2008
- Affiliations: WFTDA
- Org. type: Non-profit
- Website: bayareaderby.com

Bay Area Derby, formerly B.ay A.rea D.erby Girls, is a women's flat-track roller derby league based in the San Francisco Bay Area. Bay Area Derby (BAD) was founded in 2004 and is a founding member of the Women's Flat Track Derby Association (WFTDA). BAD is a skater-owned and -operated 501(c)(3) non-profit league. The league is composed of four teams for intra-league play, and an all-star travel team that competes nationally. As of 2016, BAD was ranked in the top 20 overall in WFTDA.

== Teams ==
Richmond Wrecking Belles vs. San Francisco ShEvil Dead in 2008

Home Teams Compete locally.

- Berkeley Resistance (founded 2011)
- Oakland Outlaws (founded 2004)
- Richmond Wrecking Belles (founded 2005, now defunct)
- San Francisco ShEvil Dead (founded 2004)

Travel Team Competes internationally.

- All Stars (A team) and Team Gold (B-team)

BAD has a "Swim Team" aka "Free Agent Pool," composed of skaters coming back after a long-term absence, skaters who have not yet been drafted to a home team, and skaters who are in the process of transferring to the league from another league or Reckless Rollers.

== History ==
Former Bay Area league logo

BAD formed in August, 2004, and practice was during open skate at Golden Skate Roller Rink in San Ramon, California. BAD later moved to The Bladium in Alameda, California, in early 2005, and Dry Ice Hockey Arena in Oakland, California later in 2005. BAD signed the lease at their current practice space, a warehouse in West Oakland, California, on April 1, 2010.

BAD's first bout, "Thirst for Blood," was held at Dry Ice Hockey Arena on Saturday, October 22, 2005. It featured the Oakland Outlaws vs the San Francisco ShEvil Dead. Final Score: ShEvil Dead 59, Outlaws 50.

In January 2016, the league announced it had changed its name from B.ay A.rea D.erby Girls to Bay Area Derby in an effort to better reflect the diversity of its members.

== WFTDA competition ==
The BAD All-Stars were founded in January, 2006 by the BAD coaching committee to represent the league at the 2006 Dust Devil National Flat Track Derby Tournament in Tucson, Arizona on February 24–26, 2006. Hosted by Tucson Roller Derby, this tournament was the BAD All-Stars' first inter-league tournament as well as the first WFTDA-sanctioned inter-league roller derby tournament. Original Roster:

- Faster PussyCat $100
- Ghoulina 26
- Iva Vendetta 1031
- Killer Vee 1337
- Kitt Turbo 667
- Liza Machete 1
- mindianapolis500 0
- Miss Moxxxie XOXO
- Racey Lane 96
- Sassy Slayher .30-06
- Skatzophrenic 51/50
- Stitches Stew 187
- Surly Vixen 00
- Terra Nüone 1111

BAD came in as a relative unknown to the tournament, but started strong and beat the Windy City Rollers and Dallas Derby Devils, and tied Arizona Roller Derby's Tent City Terrors (eventual 3rd-place finishers) in the tournament's first day round-robin seeding event. BAD moved on to day 2 but fell to the Carolina Rollergirls.

Since the formation of the All Stars team, Bay Area has qualified for WFTDA Playoffs and/or WFTDA Championships every season.

=== Rankings ===
Season	Final ranking	Playoffs	Championship
2006	9	—	9
2007	13	QF W	DNQ
2008	N/A	2 W	R1
2009	6 W	5 W	DNQ
2010	3 W	3 W	R1
2011	6 W	6 W	DNQ
2012	3 W	3 W	QF
2013	2 WFTDA	1 D1	3 D1
2014	3 WFTDA	1 D1	3 D1
2015	9 WFTDA	2 D1	QF D1
2016	20 WFTDA	4 D1	DNQ
2017	13 WFTDA	CR D1	DNQ
2018	19 WFTDA	CR	DNQ

- CR = consolation round

== Community Involvement ==
BAD provides an environment for people of all athletic abilities to compete with like-minded women and push themselves to a higher athletic ability. BAD started a recreational league in 2010, Reckless Rollers, which is composed of derby skaters in training, BAD alumni, and league members.

From 2006-09, and 2013 onwards, BAD provides equipment and skating lessons to an economically-disadvantaged grade school in Richmond, CA as the "Skater Tots" program, for 8 weeks out of the school year, essentially, being the "gym class" for a trimester. In 2011, BAD was involved with beer booths at both the San Francisco Pride and Oakland Pride parades, the latter with Mayor Jean Quan. In addition, BAD made appearances at the Piedmont Fourth of July Parade and Beats 4 Boobs

BAD has also partnered with the San Francisco Breast Cancer Emergency Fund, SF Cheer, The Girl Scouts of NorCal, Rocket Dog Rescue, The Sisters of Perpetual Indulgence, and Alameda County Food Bank.

== Media ==
2011
Skater 26, a short documentary on roller derby featured athletes from all four home teams, with Chantilly Mace and Miss Moxxxie as the featured participants.

2009
August 30, 2009: What Would Brian Boitano Make?, Food Network,
November 16, 2009: BAD appeared in the video for "Felt Chewed Up" by Slug and Murs on the album Felt 3: A Tribute to Rosie Perez. Directed by Alexander Tarrant and Justin Metros

2008
October: "The Hot 20 Under 40" issue of 7x7 Magazine
