= Rocky Mountain Roller Derby =

Roller derby league

- Metro area: Denver, CO
- Country: United States
- Founded: 2004
- Teams: 5280 Fight Club (A team); Contenders (travel); Project Mayhem (travel); Red Ridin' Hoods; Sugar Kill Gang; Dooms Daisies; United States Pummeling Service
- Track type: Flat
- Venue: The Rollerdome, Denver, CO
- Affiliations: WFTDA
- Website: www.rmrd.org

Rocky Mountain Roller Derby (RMRD) is a flat-track roller derby league based in Denver, Colorado. Founded in 2004, Rocky Mountain is a founding member of the Women's Flat Track Derby Association (WFTDA), and has qualified for WFTDA Playoffs every year, including winning the WFTDA Championships in 2010.

== History and organization ==
Rocky Mountain Roller Derby formed as the first contemporary roller derby league in Denver in 2004, and by July 2005 held their first local game, between the Red Ridin' Hoods and the Sugar Kill Gang. Later that year, the nascent organization split and a number of former members launched the rival Denver Roller Dolls. In January 2010, RMRG moved into the Fillmore Auditorium, selling out their season opener in February.

By 2014, Rocky Mountain Roller Derby had roughly 110 members, and a league comprising 4 home teams and 3 travel teams. Home teams are the Red Ridin' Hoods, the Sugar Kill Gang, United States Pummeling Service, and Dooms Daisies. All-stars from those teams form the interleague A travel team, the 5280 Fight Club, which competes against other roller derby leagues for rankings. A second (B) travel team, the Contenders, consists of Fight Club alternates and other league skaters. The latest Rocky Mountain Roller Derby travel team is Project Mayhem.

Rocky Mountain Roller Derby is a registered non-profit organization.

== WFTDA competition ==
The Rocky Mountain Roller Derby finished second in the 2009 WFTDA Western Regional Tournament, which they co-hosted with the Denver Roller Dolls, qualifying them to compete in the 2009 Championships. At the 2009 WFTDA Championships, the 5280 Fight Club defeated Houston Roller Derby in the first round by a score of 239-46. In the quarterfinals, RMRG beat the Philly Rollergirls Liberty Belles in overtime, 128-121, eliminating Philly from the tournament. In the semifinals, the 5280 Fight Club lost to the Texas Rollergirls 139-82, with Texas advancing to the championship bout and Rocky Mountain going to the third-place bout. Finally, the Rocky Mountain Roller Derby lost to the Denver Roller Dolls in their second matchup ever, 151-103, to finish in fourth place for the tournament.

The Rocky Mountain Roller Derby handed the Oly Rollers their first ever defeat to finish first in the 2010 Western Regional Tournament. Just over a month later, Rocky Mountain faced Oly again in a rematch for the 2010 WFTDA Championships. In one of the most intense games in WFTDA history, Rocky Mountain beat Oly again by a score of 147-146 to claim their first WFTDA Championship. Prior to meeting Oly in the finals, Rocky Mountain's 5280 Fight Club had to get past previously-undefeated Gotham (113-79) in the semi-finals.

In 2017, Rocky again qualified for WFTDA Playoffs ranked at 31 overall on June 30, however they declined their invitation to Playoffs.

=== Rankings ===
Season	Final ranking	Playoffs	Championship
2006	14 WFTDA	—	20
2007	19 WFTDA	R1 W	DNQ
2008	2 W	8 W	DNQ
2009	3 W	2 W	4
2010	1 W	1 W	1
2011	2 W	2 W	QF
2012	6 W	6 W	DNQ
2013	9 WFTDA	2 D1	R1 D1
2014	12 WFTDA	3 D1	R1 D1
2015	16 WFTDA	4 D1	DNQ
2016	46 WFTDA	7 D1	DNQ
2017	31 WFTDA	DNP D1	DNQ

== In popular culture ==
In 2013, league members Beth "Fiona Grapple" Bandimere and Mona "Triple Shot Misto" Egender competed on Season 22 of The Amazing Race, and finished in third place; promotional materials provided ample coverage of Rocky Mountain Roller Derby.

Preceded by Oly Rollers	WFTDA Championship winners 2010	Succeeded by Gotham Girls Roller Derby
Preceded by Oly Rollers	WFTDA Western Regional Tournament winners 2010	Succeeded by Oly Rollers
