= Rat City Roller Derby =

Roller derby league

- Metro area: Seattle
- Country: United States
- Founded: 2004
- Teams: Rat City All-Stars (A team); The Rain of Terror (B team); Derby Liberation Front; Grave Danger; Sockit Wenches; Throttle Rockets
- Track type: Flat
- Venue: Spartan Recreation Center (Shoreline); Climate Pledge Arena
- Affiliations: WFTDA
- Org. type: WA non-profit corp
- Website: https://ratcityrollerderby.com/

Rat City Roller Derby is a women's flat-track roller derby league in Seattle, Washington. Founded in 2004 as Rat City Rollergirls, LLC, the league has incorporated alternative cultural influences, and has inspired and mentored other leagues. Rat City is a founding member of the Women's Flat Track Derby Association (WFTDA), and has achieved success on the WFTDA stage, qualifying for WFTDA Playoffs every season, including a second-place finish in the 2007 WFTDA Championships.

== League history and structure ==
The league was founded as Rat City Rollergirls in 2004 by "Dixie Dragstrip", Lilly "Hurricane Lilly" Warner and Rahel "Rae's Hell" Cook. Nearly 2000 fans attended the first league home team championship in October 2005 at a former navy hangar in Magnuson Park, as the Derby Liberation Front defeated the Throttle Rockets 52-32.

The Rat City Rollergirls hosted the 2006 Roller Derby "Bumberbout" Flat Track Invitational on Saturday, September 2, 2006, in the KeyArena at Seattle Center. The Texas Rollergirls won the championship, retaining undefeated status. The Rat City Rollergirls finished second. Within the Rat City Rollergirl league, the Sockit Wenches won the season championship at Sand Point on October 21, 2006. They beat the formerly undefeated Derby Liberation Front, scoring the decisive points in the final seconds of the match, and of the season.

In February 2008 Rat City first hosted the Rust Riot Pacific Northwest Tournament, predominantly featuring B-teams from Washington, Oregon and Idaho. Rat City's Rain of Terror defeated the Rose City Rollers' Axles of Annihilation to win the tournament.

In 2009, the Rat City Rollergirls announced a change of venue from the hangars at Magnuson Park to the KeyArena at Seattle Center and ShoWare Center in Kent. Ticket sales for the first bout of the season vastly exceeded expectations of KeyArena management, filling more than 4,000 of the 5,500 seat capacity in what is referred to as the 'lower bowl'. That season, Rat City averaged 4100 fans per event.

On March 6, 2010, Rat City Rollergirls had a turnout of 5,185 in KeyArena. According to announcements that evening this was record attendance for both Rat City Rollergirls and the largest attendance to women's roller derby in history.

On June 5, 2010, the Sockit Wenches defeated Grave Danger to win the season 6 championship. The lower bowl at KeyArena was sold out, with over 6000 fans in attendance and 6885 tickets sold.

In late 2017, Rat City rebranded as Rat City Roller Derby.

=== Business structure and organization ===
As a business enterprise, the league is registered as a non-profit corporation, Rat City Roller Derby, which is owned by the skaters. Although stakeholders in the enterprise, the skaters are not currently paid for their participation.

The RCRG make extensive use of a social media forum (phBB) to structure their organizational and social interactions.

== Teams ==
=== Adult teams ===
The home teams for play within the Rat City league are:

- Derby Liberation Front - 2005, 2009, 2014, 2015, 2016, 2017, 2018, 2023, 2024, and 2025 Season Champions.
- Grave Danger - 2007, 2011, 2012, 2013, and 2019 Season Champions.
- Ship Wreckers - 2026 Season Champions
- Sockit Wenches - 2006, 2008 and 2010 Season Champions. The Sockit Wenches were retired in 2022.
- Throttle Rockets - Have not won a championship.
- Rat Lab - Introduced in 2010, the training ground for new members of Rat City Roller Derby, have not yet been placed on a home team. Transitioned to a bootcamp structure in 2026.

The travel teams are:

- The Rain of Terror - Rat City's B travel team, which competed in the 2008 Rust Riot exhibition tournament with northwest roller derby leagues.
- Rat City Roller Derby All-Stars - Rat City's all star travel team, which competes against other leagues in the Women's Flat Track Derby Association (WFTDA).

=== Junior league ===
In July, 2007 a junior league was established, the Seattle Derby Brats. The Seattle Derby Brats are an independent organization that rented practice space from Rat City. They were the second junior league to start and the first to have a public bout. The first inter-league junior bout was the Tuscan Derby Brats vs The Seattle Derby Brats at the 2007 WFTDA Nationals. They were the fourth team to be part of the JRDA, the Junior Roller Derby Association. At the 2007 National Tournament, the Seattle Derby Brats skated against Tucson's junior team between the tournament games. The Seattle Derby Brats were founded and coached by Krista Lafontaine Williams ("Betty Ford Galaxy") formerly of Rat City and currently skating with the Rainier Roller Girls. Betty Ford Galaxy retired from coaching junior derby at the end of the 2014 season. Many other local skaters have helped coach and hold board positions.

The Seattle Derby Brats has teams for multiple levels of play. The youngest group of skaters (ages 8 to 11), known as the Tootsy Rollers, play a positional-blocking version of roller derby with little contact. The Tootsy Rollers are split into four teams: Lemon Drops, Acid Pops, Orange Crush and Turquoise Terrors. Division I (ages 11 to 17) is made up of four teams:Poison Skid'les, Evil Angels, Battle Axles, and Stunflowers. Division I plays positional roller derby with more in-depth strategy. Division II (ages 11 to 17) features full-contact play. The teams in Division II are in three tiers, listed in order of skill: the Toxic AvengHers/Mighty Rollers, the Ultra Violets, and the all star travel team, the Galaxy Girls.

=== PFM Roller Derby ===
PFM Roller Derby was formed as a practice group for skaters wishing to try out for Rat City, and for many years rented track space from Rat City, however the organization, a registered non-profit, has always been independent from Rat City. Composed of skaters in training, as well as recreational derby players who do not wish to commit at the level of league play, PFM alumnae go on to league play with the Rat City Rollergirls, the Rainier Roller Girls, the Dockyard Derby Dames, the Jet City Rollergirls, and the Tilted Thunder Rail Birds. Since 2018, PFM has held practices and scrimmages at Magnuson Community Center.

== In popular culture ==
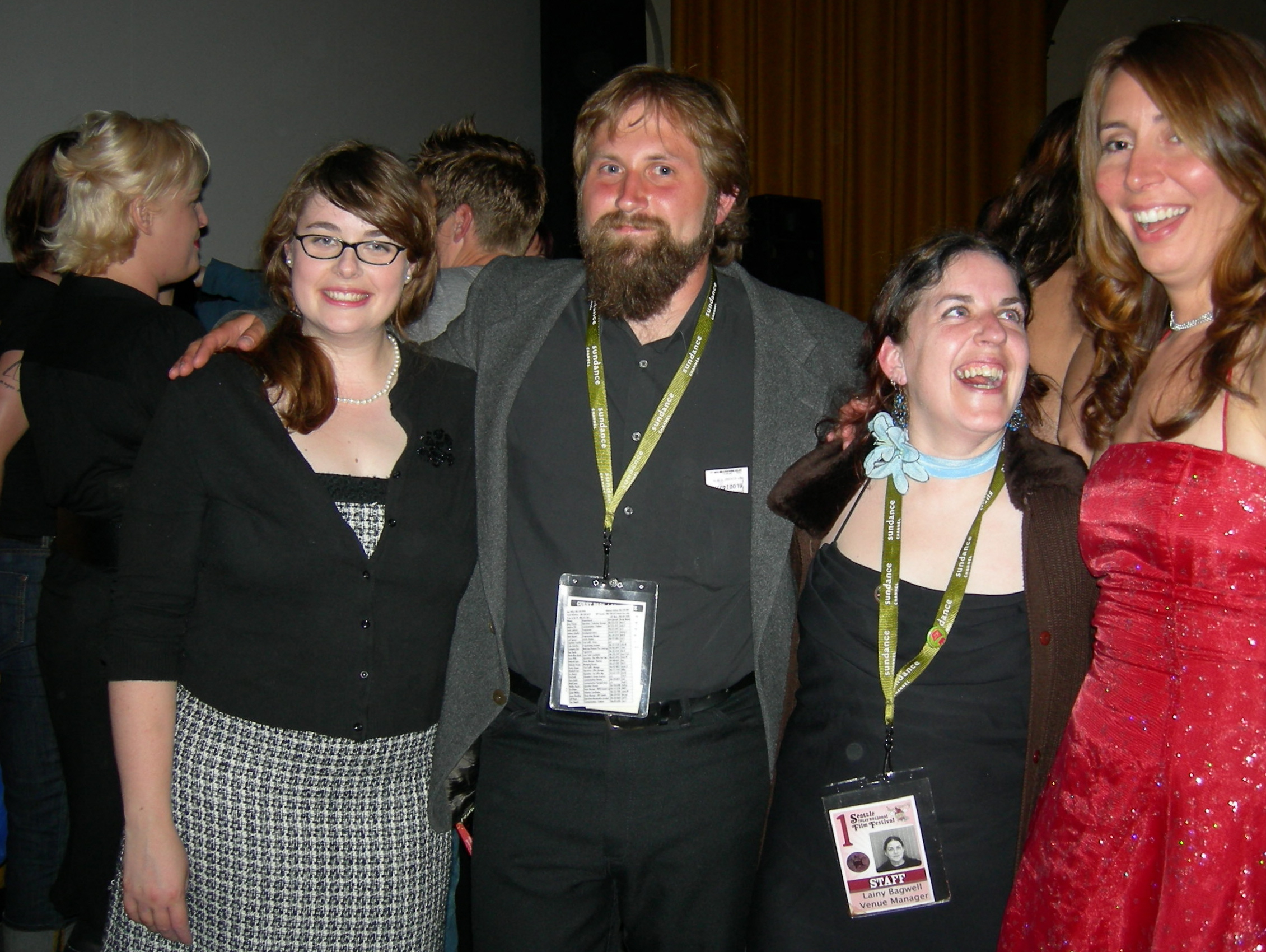
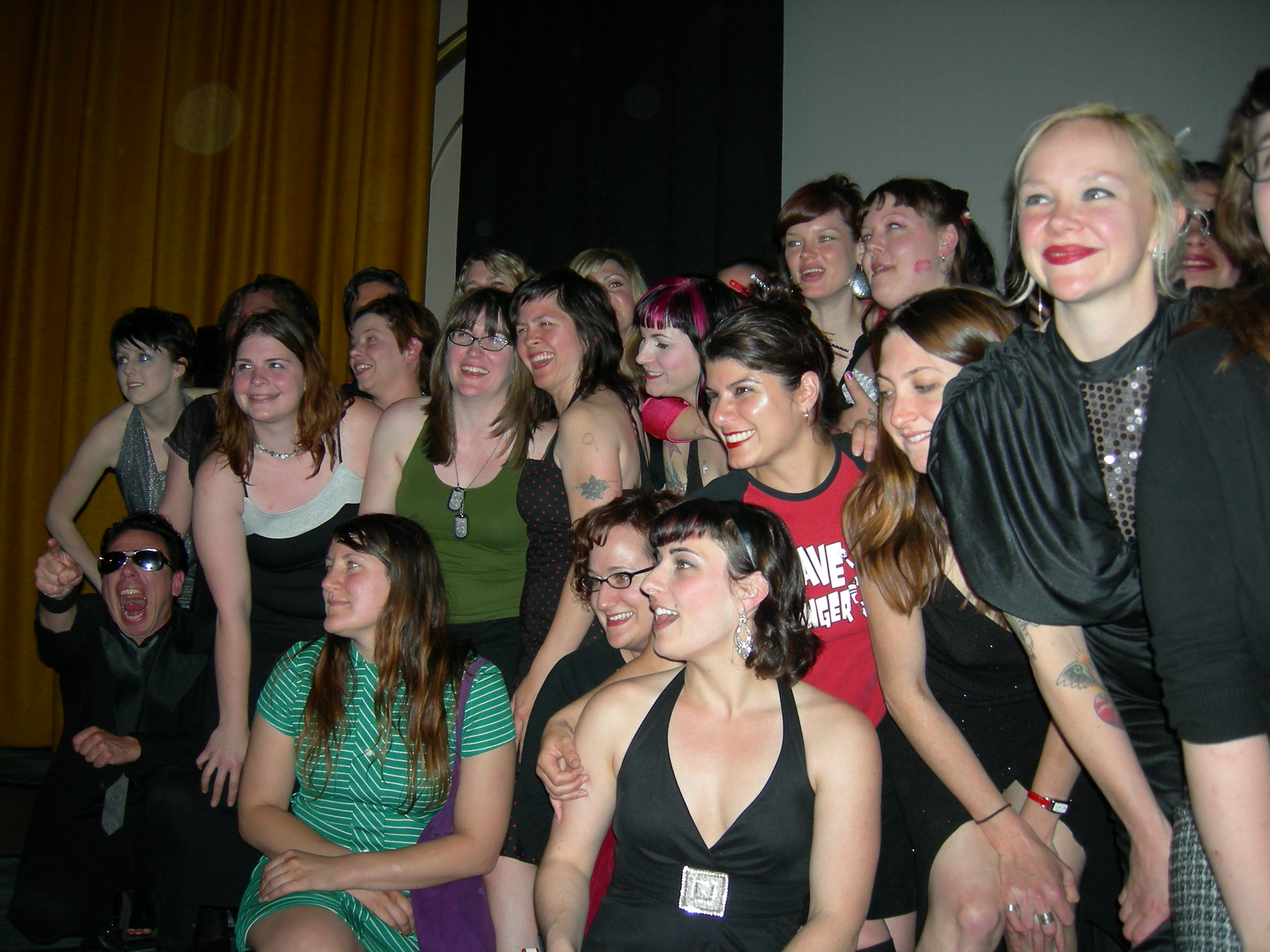
Members of Rat City attending the premiere of Blood on the Flat Track at the 2007 Seattle International Film Festival

The 2007 documentary, Blood On The Flat Track: The Rise of the Rat City Rollergirls, was directed by Lainy Bagwell and Lacey Leavitt. It played at 14 film festivals around the world, including screenings in Brisbane and Sydney, Australia, as well as Aarhus, Denmark. It was released on DVD in Canada in October 2009 and in the United States in February 2010.

Several of the members of the Rat City Rollergirls were profiled in an article on MSNBC.

In 2008, the Rat City Rollergirls were a featured league in a video game developed by Frozen Codebase and the Women's Flat Track Derby Association.

=== Trademark Dispute with Starbucks ===
In May 2008, Starbucks initiated an inquiry as to trademark infringement between the Starbucks logo and the Rat City Rollergirls "skater portrait in a circle" logo. After casual observers noted the absence of similarity, the matter was dropped in September 2008 without further legal action.

The Rat City Rollergirls logo artwork was designed by local Seattle artist, Ego.

== WFTDA competition ==
The Rat City All-Stars competed in the 2007 WFTDA National Championships in Austin, Texas. They placed second, to the 2007 national champions the Kansas City Roller Warriors. In the qualifying round, they beat the 2006 and 2005 national champions, the Texas Rollergirls, who placed third. Eight teams went to Austin to compete in the 2007 Texas Shootout National Championships, four from the eastern regional division and four from the western regional division, these notable teams included: the Carolina Rollergirls (fourth place), the Gotham Girls Roller Derby, the Tucson Roller Derby, the Detroit Derby Girls, and the Windy City Rollers.

Sweeping the WFTDA Western Regional Tournament, the Tucson Dust Devil, in an upset of the formerly top ranked Texas Texecutioners, the Rat City All-Stars rose to first in the national roller derby rankings, up from third, and rose to the first seed for the championships.

In November 2008, Rat City Rollergirls and the Rose City Rollers co-hosted the Northwest Knockdown national championships at the Portland Expo Center. Entering the competition ranked third in the nation, the Rat City Rollergirls were defeated in the first round of competition by the Windy City Rollers.

=== Rankings ===
Season	Final ranking	Playoffs	Championship
2006	3 WFTDA	—	5
2007	2 WFTDA	1 W	2
2008	1 W	3 W	R1
2009	4 W	4 W	DNQ
2010	5 W	5 W	DNQ
2011	4 W	4 W	DNQ
2012	5 W	5 W	DNQ
2013	13 WFTDA	3 D1	R1 D1
2014	16 WFTDA	4 D1	DNQ
2015	13 WFTDA	3 D1	R1 D1
2016	15 WFTDA	3 D1	R1 D1
2017	16 WFTDA	4 D1	CR D1
2018	16 WFTDA	CR	DNQ
2019	18 WFTDA	CR	DNQ
2023	14 WFTDA NA West Region	DNQ	DNQ
2024	9 WFTDA NA West Region	CR	DNQ
2025	8 WFTDA NA West Region	N/A	N/A

- CR = consolation round

Preceded by New tournament	WFTDA Western Regional Tournament winners 2007	Succeeded by Texas Rollergirls
