= Dutchland Derby Rollers =

Roller derby league

- Metro area: Lancaster, Pennsylvania
- Country: United States
- Founded: 2005
- Teams: Dutchland All-Stars (A team); Dutchland Blitz (B team)
- Track type(s): Flat
- Venue: Overlook Activities Center
- Affiliations: WFTDA
- Website: dutchlandrollers.com

Dutchland Derby Rollers or Dutchland Rollers, is a women's flat-track roller derby league based in Lancaster, Pennsylvania. Founded in 2005, the Dutchland Rollers have been a member of the Women's Flat Track Derby Association (WFTDA) since 2008.

== History and organization ==
Dutchland Rollers was founded in 2006 by Jen "Josie Cuervo" Cole. By 2014, home games were attracting between 500 and 800 fans.

The Dutchland Rollers league is composed of two interleague teams, the Dutchland All-Stars (A-Team) and the Dutchland Blitz (B-team). A third team, the C-level Crush, was disbanded ahead of the 2016 season. Home events are held at the Overlook Activities Center in Manheim Township.

All-star skater Vanessa "V-Diva" Sites was a member of Dutchland when named to the inaugural Team USA roster for the 2011 Roller Derby World Cup.

In 2019, Dutchland was the host league for the WFTDA North American East Continental Cup held in Lancaster.

== WFTDA competition ==
Dutchland earned their first WFTDA-sanctioned victory on June 13, 2009, 206-75 against the Long Island Roller Rebels. At the 2010 WFTDA Eastern Regional Tournament, Dutchland fell to Providence Roller Derby, Montreal Roller Derby and DC Rollergirls to finish in tenth place. At the 2011 Eastern Regional, Dutchland opened with a 198-117 victory over Maine Roller Derby, positioning them to face top-seeded Gotham Girls Roller Derby in the quarterfinal. However, in a move widely considered to be controversial, Dutchland opted to forfeit their game against Gotham, determining it would be better for the team's final performance in other games to not play a game they expected to lose by a wide margin. The forfeit was ultimately scored a 100-0 victory for Gotham. Dutchland next played in the consolation round against Montreal, losing 225-124 in a game in which the crowd often expressed its feelings about the forfeit. After a 213-90 loss to Boston Derby Dames Dutchland finished the weekend in eighth place. At the 2012 Eastern Regional, Dutchland lost to Carolina Rollergirls and Montreal, before finishing in tenth place after a 476-107 loss to Steel City Derby Demons.

== Rankings ==
Season	Final ranking	Playoffs	Championship
2009	12 E	DNQ	DNQ
2010	10 E	10 E	DNQ
2011	9 E	8 E	DNQ
2012	10 E	10 E	DNQ
2013	73 WFTDA	DNQ	DNQ
2014	115 WFTDA	DNQ	DNQ
2015	145 WFTDA	DNQ	DNQ
2016	241 WFTDA	DNQ	DNQ
2017	199 WFTDA	DNQ	DNQ
2018	271 WFTDA	DNQ	DNQ
