= Carolina Roller Derby =

Roller derby league in North Carolina, US

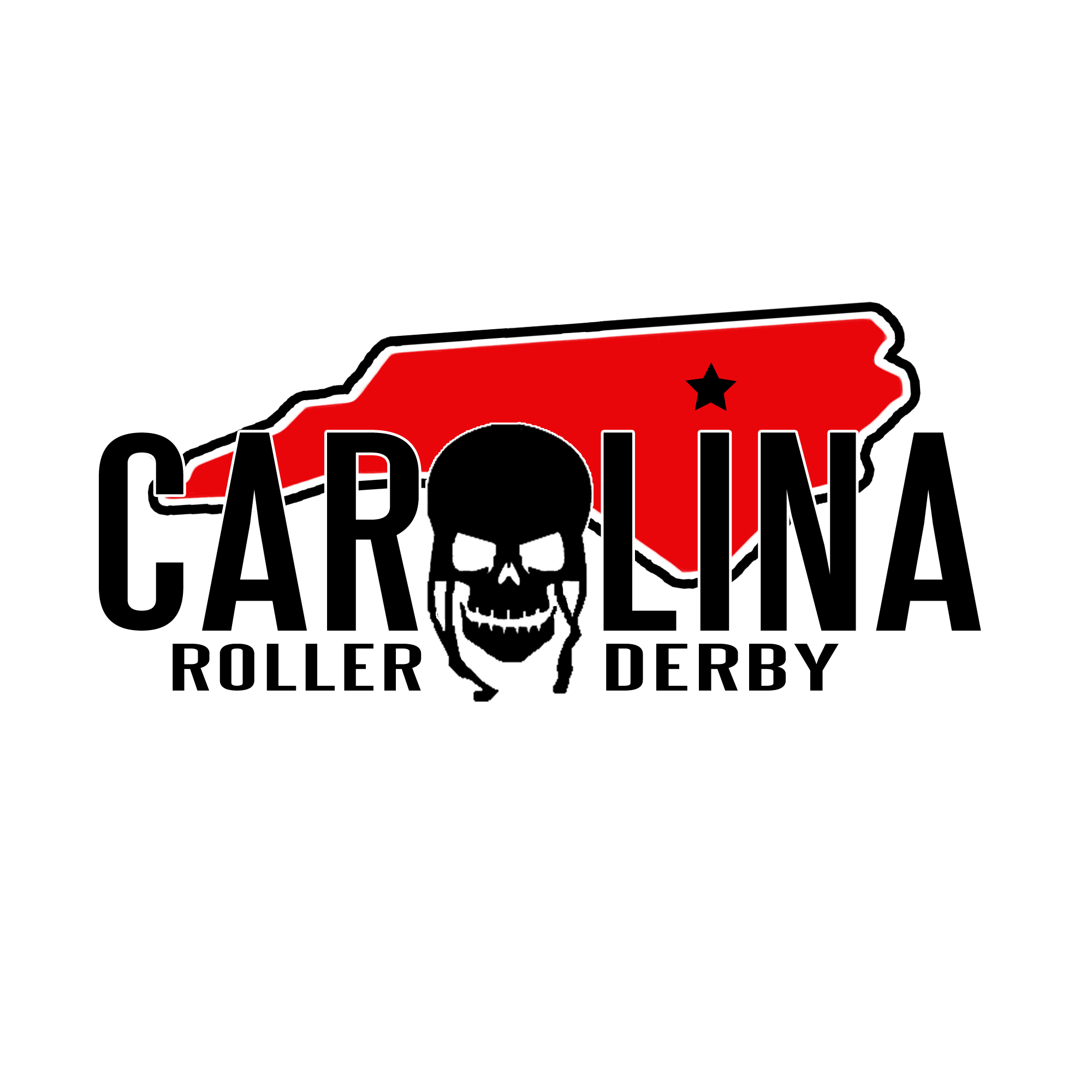
- Metro area: Raleigh, North Carolina
- Country: United States
- Founded: January 2004
- Teams: Carolina All-Stars (A-team); Carolina Bootleggers (B-team)
- Track type: Flat
- Venues: Apex XL Sports World
- Affiliations: WFTDA
- Org. type: 501(c)(3) NPO

Carolina Roller Derby is a women's flat-track roller derby league in Raleigh, North Carolina. Operating as a 501(c)(3) non-profit organization and founded in January 2004, Carolina is a founding member of the Women's Flat Track Derby Association (WFTDA).

== History ==
Original CRG logo

Pre-2019 league logo

While traveling through Austin, Texas, in late 2003, graphic designer Laura Weakland, inspired by a banked-track roller derby bout put on by the Lonestar Rollergirls, decided to start a local league in Raleigh. Although inspired by a banked-track event, practicality dictated that Weakland pursue flat-track derby. Weakland, now known by her derby name "Celia Fate", began soliciting potential skaters with recruiting sessions in early 2004. Initial practices featured some women who had skated as adults, but many had not been on wheels since middle school and practices were loosely organized, at first consisting of mostly drills and laps.

Carolina Rollergirls held its first exhibition bout on September 19, 2004, at Raleigh's Skate Ranch, featuring two ad-hoc teams, the Crimson Crushers against the Black Widows, and a second exhibition followed on November 21, 2004. The first two permanent home teams, the Debutante Brawlers and Trauma Queens, took part in CRG's first official bout on April 10, 2005, as the Trauma Queens defeated the Debutante Brawlers 138–131. The Debutante Brawlers won the season championship on June 19, 2005, ending the league's inaugural season.

In 2006, CRG introduced the Tai Chi-tahs as a new home team, who claimed the "Golden Skate Championship" that year, defeating the Debutante Brawlers 149–142. By this point, a two-phase season had developed, with home team matchups taking place the first half of the year and interleague games (featuring visiting leagues from across the country) in the second half. After regularly bouting to sell-out crowds at the Ranch, the league moved to historic Dorton Arena at the State Fairgrounds, although the Skate Ranch would remain its practice facility.

The 2007 season opened with a round robin tournament between all three home teams on January 21, and featured four double-headers, with the Debs going up against the Queens and the Chi-tahs taking on the Atlanta Rollergirls travel team in March. In mid-April, the Chi-tahs defeated the Queens (56–41) and the Debs beat the Cincinnati Rollergirls All-Stars (73–25). A week later the Chi-tahs defeated the Debs (78–65) and the Trauma Queens took down Birmingham, Alabama's Tragic City Rollers (63–53). On June 9, the last of the season's double headers featured an interleague win for the Trauma Queens against Southern Virginia's Dominion Derby Girls (72–44), and the Tai Chi-tahs beat the Debutante Brawlers by one point to win the Golden Skate for the second straight year.

The 2008 season opened on March 29 with a substantial, defense-heavy Trauma Queens victory over the Tai Chi-tahs, 104–34. The Chi-Tahs lost again on April 20 to the Debutante Brawlers, 85–55. The rookie-heavy Debs, led by league veterans Shirley Temper and Roxy Rockett, took an 81–69 victory over the Queens. On June 7, the Debs and Queens skated through triple-digit temperatures at Dorton Arena, as the Debs took a substantial early lead in the first half, but the Queens fought their way back in the second half. Ultimately, the Debs won their first championship since 2005, 57–50.

The league hosted the 2009 WFTDA Eastern Regional Tournament at Dorton Arena.

== WFTDA competition ==
On November 18, 2005, CRG played its first interleague (and away game) against Minnesota Rollergirls. Minnesota defeated Carolina by a wide margin, but in January 2006, Carolina hosted a rematch and held the score to a 10-point differential. CRG's undefeated 2006 interleague season saw the All-Stars defeat Las Vegas's Neanderdolls, both at home (127–65) and away (133–84), as well as Providence Roller Derby's Rhode Island Riveters (131–102, before a crowd of 1700) and Phoenix's Tent City Terrors (100–90), both at home. In 2006, Carolina competed at the first WFTDA Championships where they finished in eighth place.

CRG began 2007 with an away-game win against Baltimore's Charm City Roller Girls (140–72). In March 2007, CRG participated in the inaugural East Coast Derby Extravaganza (ECDX), a derby tournament hosted by the Philly Rollergirls. The CRG team won both of their WFTDA bouts there, over New York's Gotham Girls Roller Derby 115–104 and also defeating the Detroit Derby Girls 192–49. On May 12, the CRG All-Stars went to Phoenix for a rematch against the Tent City Terrors, losing by three points. The latter half of 2007 took the 7th-ranked CRG All-Stars on the road, first to Providence in June for a second win against the Rhode Island Riveters 104–68, and then, in August, to the WFTDA Eastern Regional Tournament in Columbus, Ohio, where the team placed third and secured its slot at the WFTDA Championships in Austin, Texas. Two weeks before Championships, the All-Stars returned home for a face-off against the Texas Rollergirls, narrowly losing 64–59. At Championships September 29–30, the All-Stars advanced to the final four (the only East Region league to do so) with a win against the Tucson Roller Derby Saddletramps 80–73. The following day, CRG fought a lost 108–116 to the Kansas City Roller Warriors, to finish in fourth place.

After a brief break, the interleague season continued at home in November with an easy win against San Francisco's Bay Area Derby Girls, 74–45. On December 2, Kansas City came to Raleigh for a rematch, and the CRG All-Stars pulled out a one-point win. In 2008, the CRG All-Stars went to Philadelphia for the second annual East Coast Derby Extravaganza (ECDX), where they kicked off the weekend event with a win against the Denver Roller Dolls, 129–49, and a win against Chicago's Windy City Rollers, 76–60.

In 2008, Carolina finished in fourth place at the Eastern Regional Tournament, thus missing Championships for the first time. At the 2009 Eastern Regional Tournament, hosted by CRG, an opening round loss to Boston was followed by victories over Dominion Derby Girls and Providence, resulting in a fifth-place finish. In 2010, victories over DC Rollergirls and Montreal Roller Derby were offset by losses to Philly and Steel City, resulting in a sixth-place finish at Regionals. At the 2011 East Regional, Carolina was the seventh seed and finished in ninth place by defeating Maine Roller Derby 241–172. In 2012, Carolina was the eighth seed and finished in eighth place with a 156–128 loss to Boston.

In 2013, the WFTDA restructured Playoffs into a divisional system rather than geographic, and Carolina competed at the Division 2 Playoff in Kalamazoo, Michigan as the fourth seed, and finished in seventh place by defeating Burning River, 250–131. After missing Playoffs in 2014 and 2015, Carolina returned to Division 2 Playoffs in 2016 at Wichita as the tenth seed, and lost their three games to finish the weekend in tenth place.

=== Rankings ===
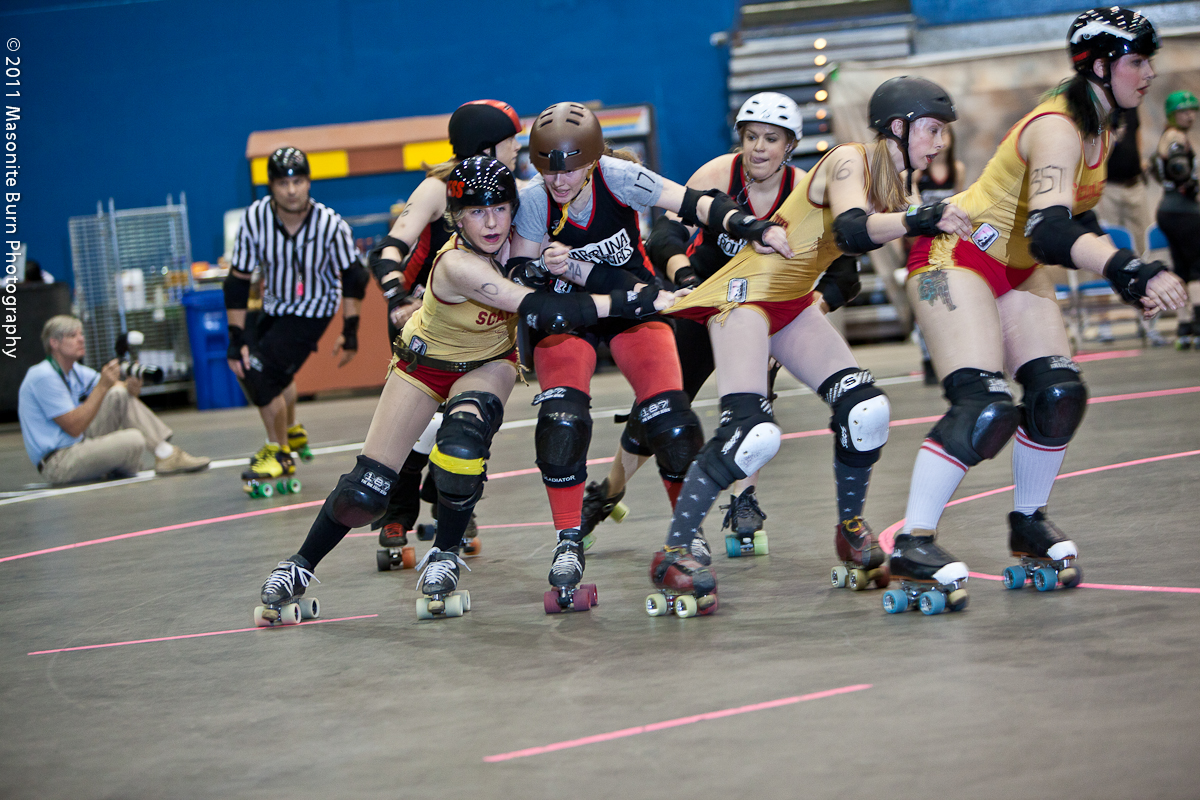
Carolina (in black) take on the Angel City Derby Girls at the 2011 Dust Devil tournament.

Season	Final ranking	Playoffs	Championship
2006	7 WFTDA	—	8
2007	4 WFTDA	3 E	4
2008	NR	4 E	DNQ
2009	5 E	5 E	DNQ
2010	6 E	6 E	DNQ
2011	8 E	9 E	DNQ
2012	8 E	8 E	DNQ
2013	78 WFTDA	7 D2	DNQ
2014	96 WFTDA	DNQ	DNQ
2015	68 WFTDA	DNQ	DNQ
2016	66 WFTDA	10 D2	DNQ
2017	130 WFTDA	DNQ	DNQ
2018	106 WFTDA	DNQ	DNQ

- NR = no end-of-year ranking supplied

== League governance ==
The league is governed by a board of directors. Skater participation is encouraged and, in fact, necessary, as CRG is run entirely by volunteerism. The league is run by the skaters, for the skaters. Board positions include chair, training director, marketing director, director of sponsorship, director of finance, league representative, and head of bout production. League meetings are held quarterly. Although non-skaters (e.g., referees and other support staff) can serve on committees, only skaters vote on league issues.
