= Providence Roller Derby =

Roller derby league

- Metro area: Providence, Rhode Island
- Country: United States
- Founded: 2004
- Teams: Rhode Island Riveters (A team); Providence B (B team)
- Track type: Flat
- Venue: Thayer Arena
- Affiliations: WFTDA
- Org. type: non-profit (member-managed)
- Website: providencerollerderby.com

Providence Roller Derby (PRD) is a women's flat track roller derby league based in Providence, Rhode Island. Founded in 2004 as the first all-female flat-track roller derby league in New England, Providence is a founding member of the Women's Flat Track Derby Association (WFTDA).

== History ==
Sarah Kingan, using the derby name "Sarah Doom", a Brown University alumna, established Providence Roller Derby in 2004. She originally trained with Tucson Roller Derby while on an internship in Tucson, Arizona. After moving back to New England, she started the league in Providence. Skaters were recruited and trained for over a year before creating teams and public bouting. Kingan soon left Providence to pursue a doctorate at Harvard University and shortly thereafter helped found the Boston Derby Dames.

The league's first two teams were the Providence Mob Squad and the Sakonnet River Roller Rats, comprising skaters aged 19 to 29, and the league's first exhibition bout was May 1, 2005 at the outdoor Bank of America Skating Center. The weather report predicted sun by the afternoon, but when the teams showed up the rink was completely flooded, and head referee Billy the Kid began squeegeeing water off the track until rink staff arrived and used a zamboni to dry the surface. Eventually the Mob Squad claimed the first victory. David Cicilline, the then-mayor of Providence, attended the first game. Season one culminated in New England's first interleague bout between Boston and Providence in October 2005, won by Providence.

In 2006, Providence Roller Derby introduced a third team: the Old Money Honeys. The Old Money Honeys lost their first game of the season but won the season Championship 136-114 against the Sakonnet River Roller Rats, under the leadership of Dolly Rocket and including powerful skaters such as Lotta Pain, Anna Wrecks'Ya, Jean Harlot and Craisy Dukes in her debut season. This season also debuted notable vets Sass E. McNasty (Old Money Honeys) and Baby Fighterfly (Sakonnet River Roller Rats).

In the 2007 season, The Mob Squad reigned undefeated and won the championship. Lotta Pain was the 2007 Mob Squad team captain. The team included notable veteran skaters such as Burnin' Helen, Baby Fighterfly, Elle Razor and jammer/blocker phenom, daSilva Bullet. This also marked the debut season for Rhode Kill on The Mob Squad.

The 2009 season marked the first Championship win for the Sakonnet River Roller Rats with Craisy Dukes as team captain. With the recruitment of stand-outs such as Trophy Knife and Kid Ace, the Rats formed a team with intense skill and teamwork. They skated away with their first win at the big game and would follow up with back-to-back Championship trophies in 2010 under the leadership of Kid Ace.

PRD's 2011 season began with The Mob Squad coming off of a 2-year losing streak, having not won a single game since the 2008 season. Baby Fighterfly became the new captain, and the Mob were able to take their team to an undefeated season for a 2nd time with notables Hit and Run Paulene, Ruca A. Salt, Rhode Kill, Bleeding Rainbow, Sweet Tease, Rumbledore and The Phury. New skaters Citizen Toxie and Tiger Bomb were standouts in their first season as well, giving the Mob a well-rounded team to take back the trophy and become PRD's most winningest Championship team.

PRD formerly held practices in Narragansett in the winter months and outside at the Bank of America Skating Center in the warmer season. As of May 2015, with the closure of the Narragansett Ocean Club skating rink, the league is searching for a permanent home. PRD has the support of the Mayor and the city. The league makes a concerted effort to be involved in and support community events and local businesses by making appearances marching in parades, volunteer work in the community, working with local charities and holding fundraisers.

=== Home Season Championships ===
Season	Champion	Runner up	Final score
2005	Mob Squad	Sakonnet River Roller Rats	
2006	Old Money Honeys	Sakonnet River Roller Rats	
2007	Mob Squad	Old Money Honeys	
2008	Old Money Honeys	The Mob Squad	
2009	Sakonnet River Roller Rats	Old Money Honeys	
2010	Sakonnet River Roller Rats	Old Money Honeys	
2011	Mob Squad	Old Money Honeys	

== Travel teams ==
Since their formation, the Rhode Island Riveters A team has played in what were once known as the "Big 5" tournaments (WFTDA Playoffs and/or Championships) numerous times. In February 2006, Providence's Rhode Island Riveters, including Dolly Rocket, daSilva Bullet, Shirley Trample, Ratt Scallion, Sweet Destruction and Jailbird Jenny debuted at Dust Devil in February, the first WFTDA Championships. In 2006 Providence defeated the Gotham Girls Roller Derby All-Stars of New York City at the Rhode Island Convention Center that summer. Later in 2006, the Riveters lost to the Carolina Rollergirls at Dorton Arena in Raleigh, North Carolina. Providence competed at the first WFTDA Eastern Regional Tournament, known as "Heartand Havoc", as the sixth seed in 2007, and was eliminated in the second round following a 98-55 loss to Carolina. At the 2008 Eastern Regionals, Providence lost to Detroit Derby Girls, Grand Raggidy Roller Girls and Minnesota Rollergirls and finished in 12th place. At the 2009 Eastern Regional tournament, Providence lost their opening game to Gotham, then defeated CT RollerGirls, and then lost to Carolina to finish in sixth place. In 2010, Providence opened the Eastern Playoff by defeating the Dutchland Rollers, but then lost to Gotham, Steel City and Montreal Roller Derby to finish in eighth place.

=== Rankings ===
Season	Final ranking	Playoffs	Championship
2006	10 WFTDA	—	11
2007	18 WFTDA	R2 E	DNQ
2008	NR	12 E	DNQ
2009	6 E	6 E	DNQ
2010	8 E	8 E	DNQ
2011	13 E	DNQ	DNQ
2012	18 E	DNQ	DNQ
2013	92 WFTDA	DNQ	DNQ
2014	78 WFTDA	DNQ	DNQ
2015	91 WFTDA	DNQ	DNQ
2016	85 WFTDA	DNQ	DNQ

- NR = team did not receive an end-of-year WFTDA ranking

The Killah Bee's, Providence Roller Derby's B-team, was formed in early 2009. The Bee's have included many skaters who have graduated to the Riveter's roster as well as some alternates playing for both teams, including Shelby Bruisin', Rhoda Perdition, Cindy Lou Screw and Penny Candy Poison among many other talented skaters. The Bee's continue to field a competitive team of which the Riveters continues to bring skaters up to the nationally ranked roster.
