= Albany All Stars Roller Derby =

Flat track roller derby league

- Metro area: Albany, New York
- Country: United States
- Founded: 2006
- Teams: All Stars, Brawl Stars
- Track type: Flat
- Venue: Washington Avenue Armory
- Affiliations: Woman's Flat Track Derby Association (WFTDA)
- Website: albanyallstars.com

Albany All Stars Roller Derby (AASRD) is a flat track roller derby league based in Albany, New York. AASRD was founded in 2006 and was the capital region's first flat track roller derby league. The league is a member of the Women's Flat Track Derby Association and consists of two teams: the All Stars and the Brawl Stars. Home bouts are held at the Washington Avenue Armory.

== League history ==
AASRD was founded in 2006 by six skaters and originally consisted of two teams. Since the league was founded, home teams have included the Department of Public Hurts (DPH), the Empire Skate Troopers (EST) the Skate-o-Masochists, and the Capital City Legislayers (CCL). The league also has two inter-league teams: the WFTDA-chartered A team, the All Stars, and the non-chartered B team, the Brawl Stars.

After their inaugural season they were voted "Best New Sports Team" in the Metroland Reader's Poll.

=== Charitable work or activity ===
Skaters for the Albany All Stars are involved in charitable activities throughout the year; they have even rappelled off buildings to fund raise for the Special Olympics and streaked down Lark Street as a sponsor of the Santa Speedo Sprint to benefit The Albany Damien Center. A portion of their home bout raffles have always been donated to a large variety of local charities.

=== Awards and recognition ===
The Albany All Stars Roller Derby League is mentioned in several local "best of" lists including: Metroland Readers' Poll – "Best Time to be Had in the Capital Region for Under $10" (2011) Metroland Readers' Poll – "Best Place to See and be Seen" (2011) Metroland Readers' Poll – "Best Evidence That the Region Is Looking Up" (2009) Metroland Readers' Poll – "Best Time to be Had in the Capital Region for Under $10" (2009) Metroland Readers' Poll – "Best New Sports Team" (2008)

=== Season schedules ===
2007

8/25/2007 - AASRD Intraleague: Skateomasochists (L) vs. DPH (W) - Home (Northern Lights, Clifton Park, NY)

10/6/2007 - AASRD (46) vs. Maine Roller Derby (202) - Away

2008

2/23/2008 - AASRD Intraleague: Skateomasochists (87) vs. DPH (89) - Home (Washington Avenue Armory, Albany, NY)

3/29/2008 - AASRD EST (96) vs. Suburbia Roller Derby Suburban Brawl (121)

4/26/2008 - AASRD EST vs. Assault City Roller Derby

9/6/2008 - AASRD All Stars vs. Coal City Rollers (Wilkes-Barre, PA) - Away

10/26/2008 - AASRD EST (75) vs. HVHRD (145)

11/15/2008 - AASRD EST vs. Beast of the Northeast - Home

2009

1/24/2009 - AASRD EST vs. Jersey Shore Roller Girls - Home

2/21/2009 - AASRD EST vs. Montreal Roller Derby New Skids on the Block - Home

3/21/2009 - AASRD EST (144) vs. New Hampshire Roller Derby Skate Free or Die (78) - Home

4/18/2009 - AASRD DPH vs. Manchvegas Roller Girls - Home

5/16/2009 - AASRD EST vs. Coal City Rollers - Home

6/13/2009 - AASRD DPH vs. Skyland Roller Derby - Home

6/20/2009 - AASRD A/B+ (74) vs. CNYRD Utica Clubbers (75) - Away

9/19/2009 - AASRD Intraleague (Pre-Season): Lark Street Hipsters vs. Center Squares - Home

10/17/2009 - AASRD Intraleague (Pre-Season): Devils Rejects vs. Midnight Stalkers - Home

2010

1/9/2010 - AASRD EST (106) vs. Beast of the Northeast II (82)

1/30/2010 - AASRD DPH (40) vs. Green Mountain Derby Dames (128) - Home

2/20/2010 - AASRD DPH (60) vs. GTAR (96) - Home

3/13/2010 - AASRD DPH (152) vs. Utica Roller Girls (154) - Home

4/3/2010 - AASRD EST (51) vs. Boston B-Party (230) - Home

4/24/2010 - AASRD EST vs. Long Island Roller Rebels - Home

5/15/2010 - AASRD DPH vs. Elm City Derby Damez - Home

6/5/2010 - AASRD EST (W) vs. Jerzey Derby Brigade (F) - Home

6/19/2010 - AASRD EST (93) vs. Queen City Lake Effect Furries (142)

2011

1/8/2011 - AASRD Intraleague: EST (123) vs. CCL (63) - Home

1/29/2011 - AASRD Intraleague: EST (86) vs. DPH (84) - Home

2/19/2011 - AASRD Intraleague: DPH (90) vs. CCL (89) - Home

3/19/2011 - AASRD Intraleague: EST (71) vs. DPH (70) - Home

4/2/2011 - Double Header: AASRD (82) vs. CNYRD (145) // CDTA vs. Quadfathers - Home

4/30/2011 - AASRD B Squad vs. New Jersey Hellrazors - Home

5/21/2011 - Double Header: AASRD vs. Hudson Valley Horros // AASRD B-Squad vs. Zom-B-Squad - Home

6/11/2011 - AASRD (121) vs. Pioneer Valley Roller Derby Western Mass Destruction (119) - Home

6/25/2011 - AASRD B Squad vs. North County Lumber Jills (Plattsburgh, NY) - Home

9/1/2011 - Roc City B Sides (227) vs. AASRD B Squad (32) - Away

9/24/2011 - AASRD B Squad (60) vs. City B Sides (137) - Home

10/29/2011 - AASRD B Squad vs. Watertown Black River Rollers - Home

11/19/2011 - AASRD (L) vs. Beasts of the Northeast III (W) - Home

12/3/2011 - Babes in Toyland: AASRD vs. Broome County Rollers Parlor City Tricks - Home

2012

1/7/2012 - Winter Wonderslam: AASRD (162) vs. Oz Roller Girls (204) - Home

2/4/2012 - Heartbreakers Ball: AASRD Intraleague: Darling Dames vs. Heartless Harlots - Home

3/3/2012 - Erin go Brawl: AASRD Intraleague: Lucky Lassies vs. Sassy Shamrocks - Home

3/31/2012 - Spring Fling: AASRD Intraleague: Honey Bees vs. Tenacious Tulips - Home

4/14/2012 - Derby-Taunt Ball Doubleheader: AASRD (W) vs. Roller Derby Manchester (L) // CDTA (W) vs. Burlington Bomb Quads (L) - Home

5/5/2012 - AASRD vs. Oz Roller Girls - Away

6/3/2012 - AASRD (125) vs. PVRD Western Mass Destruction (126) - Away
