= Steel City Roller Derby =

Roller derby league

- Metro area: Pittsburgh, Pennsylvania
- Country: United States
- Founded: 2006
- Teams: Steel Hurtin' (A team); Steel Beamers (B team); Blitzburgh Bombers (C/developmental team) Former Teams Allegheny Avengers; Bitch Doctors; Hot Metal Hellions; Mon Monsters; Penn Bruisers; Slumber Party Slashers; Wrecking Dolls
- Track type: Flat
- Venue: Pittsburgh Indoor Sports Arena (Cheswick, PA)
- Affiliations: WFTDA
- Website: www.steelcityrollerderby.org

Steel City Roller Derby or SCRD, is a women's flat-track roller derby league based in Pittsburgh, Pennsylvania. Founded in 2006, the league celebrated its tenth anniversary in 2016. Steel City is a member of the Women's Flat Track Derby Association (WFTDA).

== History and league structure ==
Steel City was founded as the "Steel City Derby Demons" in 2006, after Natalie "Busty Brawler" Gilchrist, Pam "Suzy Sydal" Simmons, and Becky "Elsa Slam" Bauer were inspired to recruit skaters for a potential roller derby team after hearing from a friend about the L.A. Derby Dolls. By early 2007, Steel City was ready to hold its first public games at BladeRunners in Harmarville, and was announced as a new member of the Women's Flat Track Derby Association (WFTDA) in May 2007.

Upon its founding, Steel City had four teams, the Bitch Doctors, the Hot Metal Hellions, the Slumber Party Slashers and the Wrecking Dolls. As of 2016, SCRD features two travel teams, including the WFTDA all-star A-team, Steel Hurtin', and the B-team (formerly known as the "B-Unit"), Steel Beamers.

Then-league member Jennifer "Snot Rocket Science" Gaskins was a member of Team USA at the 2011 and 2014 editions of the Roller Derby World Cup.

In 2011, Pittsburgh city councilor Natalia Rudiak sponsored a proclamation at Pittsburgh City Council that led to a declaration of September 13, 2011 as "Steel City Derby Demons Day" in recognition of the league's "community involvement, commitment to athleticism, and positive international representation of Pittsburgh".

For much of its history, Steel City played its home games, and practiced at Romp N Roll, a roller rink in Glenshaw, which was announced to be closing in late 2016. As of 2017, Steel City is holding its home events at the Pittsburgh Indoor Sports Arena in Cheswick.

In October 2022, Steel City held a Guy Fieri-themed tournament called the Flavortahn Throwdahn as part of WFTDA's "Back on the Track" series celebrating the post-COVID-19 return to roller derby. The featured teams were Steel City's Steel Hurtin', Detroit Roller Derby, Arch Rival Roller Derby, and Penn Jersey Roller Derby.

Steel City held a jersey retirement ceremony in August 2023 to honor and memorialize skater Barbara "S'Fya" Montgomery after her death earlier that year. The number 187 has been retired within the league. S'Fya was not only a Steel Hurtin' skater but a coach and active member of the roller derby community, having also played with Team Pennsylvania and Little Steel Derby Girls (the former name of Youngstown Area Roller Derby.)

== WFTDA competition ==
After gaining WFTDA membership in 2007, Steel City first qualified for WFTDA Playoffs in 2009, as the seventh seed at that year's Eastern Regional Tournament. After opening the weekend with a sound defeat against Philly, Steel City bounced back with victories over the Dominion Derby Girls and DC Rollergirls to finish the weekend in seventh place. In 2010, Steel City improved their Eastern Regional performance by taking the fifth-place game 151–121 over the Carolina Rollergirls, and improved yet again in 2011, losing the third-place game 189–94 to Charm City to finish in fourth place. At the final East Region Playoff in 2012, fifth-seeded Steel City lost their first games to Charm City and DC, but rebounded to set a then-new Playoffs record by defeating the Dutchland Rollers 476–107 to take ninth place.

In 2013, the WFTDA moved to a top-40 Division system for Playoffs, and Steel City qualified at the Division 1 level for the tournament in Asheville, North Carolina, where they entered as the fifth seed and finished in fifth place with a 202–185 victory over Houston Roller Derby. At the 2014 Division 1 Playoff in Evansville, Indiana, seven-seed Steel City finished in eighth place with a 184–170 loss to Toronto Roller Derby. Steel City took seventh place at the 2015 Division 1 Playoff in Jacksonville with a 281–134 win over Charlottesville Derby Dames, and as the tenth seed in 2016 in Columbia, South Carolina, Steel City defeated Ann Arbor Derby Dimes 258–105 to finish in ninth place.

=== Rankings ===
Season	Final ranking	Playoffs	Championship
2007	NR	DNQ	DNQ
2008	8 E	DNQ	DNQ
2009	7 E	7 E	DNQ
2010	5 E	5 E	DNQ
2011	4 E	4 E	DNQ
2012	9 E	9 E	DNQ
2013	18 WFTDA	5 D1	DNQ
2014	29 WFTDA	8 D1	DNQ
2015	28 WFTDA	7 D1	DNQ
2016	41 WFTDA	9 D1	DNQ
2017	104 WFTDA	DNQ	DNQ
2018	103 WFTDA	DNQ	DNQ
2019	70 WFTDA	DNQ	DNQ
2023-2024	22 NA Northeast	DNQ	DNQ
