= East Region (WFTDA) =

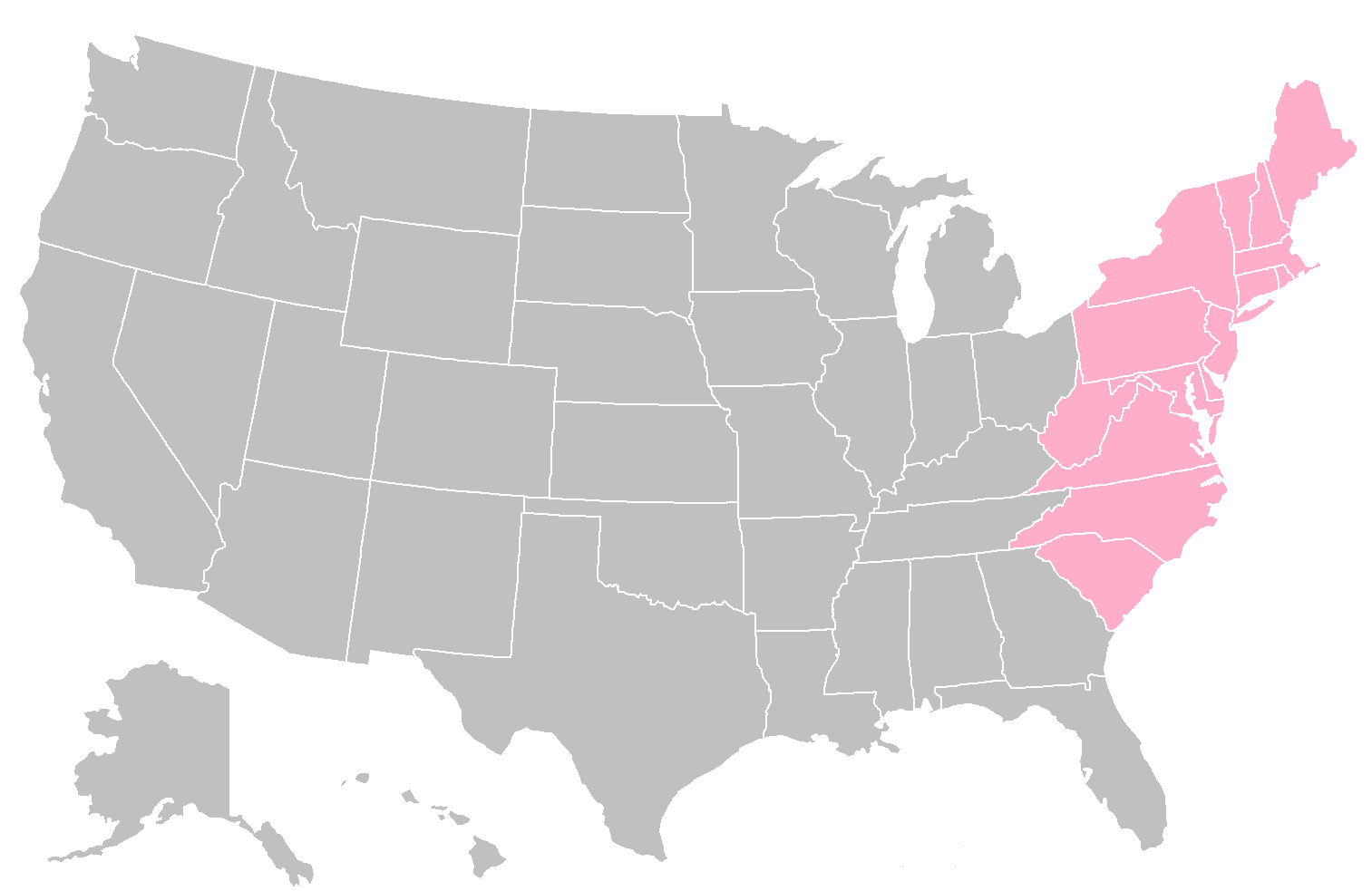
WFTDA East Region

The WFTDA's East Region was formed in 2006.

In 2009, teams from the western part of the region were moved into the North Central and South Central Regions. In 2008, the WFTDA changed from having just two regional tournaments (East and West) to five—consisting of teams from four regions: East, North Central, South Central and West.

Members of the WFTDA's Europe Region competed in the East Region, as did members in the eastern part of the Canada Region. WFTDA has now moved away from the Big 5 WFTDA Championships qualification tournament structure, which was last competed in 2012.

Starting with the 2013 WFTDA season, the regions were discontinued in favour of an overall-rankings based system, and a new playoff format was created.

== Member leagues ==
League	Metro area	Country	Admitted	Notes
Auld Reekie Roller Derby	Edinburgh	Scotland	1 September 2011	
Bear City Roller Derby	Berlin	Germany	1 March 2012	
Black Rose Rollers	Hanover, PA	United States	3 December 2012	
Boston Derby Dames	Boston, MA	United States	2006	
Cape Fear Roller Girls	Wilmington, NC	United States	1 June 2011	
Carolina Rollergirls	Raleigh, NC	United States	2006	
Central City Rollergirls	Birmingham	England	1 March 2012	
Central New York Roller Derby	Utica, NY	United States	1 September 2010	
Charlotte Roller Girls	Charlotte, NC	United States	1 June 2011	
Charlottesville Derby Dames	Charlottesville, VA	United States	3 December 2012	
Charm City Roller Girls	Baltimore, MD	United States	8 July 2006	
Columbia Quad Squad	Columbia, SC	United States	1 March 2012	
Crime City Rollers	Malmö	Sweden	1 June 2012	
CT RollerGirls	Naugatuck, CT	United States	15 January 2007	
DC Rollergirls	Washington, DC	United States	26 March 2008	
Diamond State Roller Girls	Wilmington, DE	United States	3 December 2012	
Dominion Derby Girls	Virginia Beach, VA	United States	15 January 2007	
Dutchland Rollers	Lancaster, PA	United States	3 December 2008	
Garden State Rollergirls	Newark, NJ	United States	17 June 2010	
Go-Go Gent Roller Derby	Ghent	Belgium	3 December 2012	
Glasgow Roller Derby	Glasgow	Scotland	1 June 2012	
Gotham Roller Derby	New York, NY	United States	2006	
Green Mountain Derby Dames	Burlington, VT	United States	1 September 2010	
Harrisburg Area Roller Derby	Harrisburg, PA	United States	3 May 2008	
Hellions of Troy Roller Derby	Troy, NY	United States	3 December 2012	
Helsinki Roller Derby	Helsinki	Finland	7 September 2012	
Hudson Valley Horrors Roller Derby	Kingston, NY	United States	1 December 2010	
Ithaca League of Women Rollers	Ithaca, NY	United States	1 September 2011	
Jersey Shore Roller Girls	Toms River, NJ	United States	1 September 2011	
Lehigh Valley Rollergirls	Allentown, PA	United States	1 September 2010	
Lincolnshire Bombers Roller Derby	Lincoln	England	1 June 2012	
London Roller Derby	London	England	17 June 2010	
Long Island Roller Rebels	New York, NY	United States	19 December 2006	
Lowcountry Highrollers	Charleston, SC	United States	1 December 2011	
Maine Roller Derby	Portland, ME	United States	21 September 2007	
Mason Dixon Roller Vixens	Frederick, MD	United States	1 March 2012	
Montreal Roller Derby	Montreal, QC	Canada	January 2009	
New Hampshire Roller Derby	Nashua, NH	United States	17 June 2010	
NRV Rollergirls	Christiansburg, VA	United States	1 December 2011	
Philly Rollergirls	Philadelphia, PA	United States	2006	
Providence Roller Derby	Providence, RI	United States	2006	
Queen City Roller Girls	Buffalo, NY	United States	1 September 2010	
Rideau Valley Roller Girls	Ottawa, ON	Canada	1 June 2012	
River City Rollergirls	Richmond, VA	United States		
Roc City Roller Derby	Rochester, NY	United States	1 September 2011	
Rocktown Rollers	Harrisonburg, VA	United States	1 June 2011	
Royal Windsor Roller Derby	Windsor	England	1 June 2012	
Steel City Derby Demons	Pittsburgh, PA	United States	9 November 2006	
Stockholm Roller Derby	Stockholm	Sweden	3 December 2012	
Suburbia Roller Derby	Yonkers, NY	United States	February 2009	

== Former members ==
League	Metro area	Country	Admitted	Left	Notes
Arch Rival Rollergirls	St Louis, MO	United States	18 September 2007	1 January 2009	Transferred to North Central Region
Atlanta Rollergirls	Atlanta, GA	United States	2006	1 January 2009	Transferred to South Central Region
Big Easy Rollergirls	New Orleans, LA	United States	2006	1 January 2009	Transferred to South Central Region
Brewcity Bruisers	Milwaukee, WI	United States	24 February 2007	1 January 2009	Transferred to North Central Region
Burning River Roller Girls	Cleveland, OH	United States	7 December 2007	1 January 2009	Transferred to North Central Region
Cincinnati Rollergirls	Cincinnati, OH	United States	28 July 2007	1 January 2009	Transferred to North Central Region
Detroit Derby Girls	Detroit, MI	United States	2006	1 January 2009	Transferred to North Central Region
Dixie Derby Girls	Huntsville, AL	United States	2006	1 January 2009	Transferred to South Central Region
Fort Wayne Derby Girls	Fort Wayne, IN	United States	10 January 2007	1 January 2009	Transferred to North Central Region
Gem City Rollergirls	Dayton, OH	United States	28 July 2007	1 January 2009	Transferred to North Central Region
Grand Raggidy Roller Girls	Grand Rapids, MI	United States	2006	1 January 2009	Transferred to North Central Region
Mad Rollin' Dolls	Madison, WI	United States	2006	1 January 2009	Transferred to North Central Region
Minnesota RollerGirls	St. Paul, MN	United States	2006	1 January 2009	Transferred to North Central Region
Naptown Roller Girls	Indianapolis, IN	United States	12 November 2007	1 January 2009	Transferred to North Central Region
Nashville Rollergirls	Nashville, TN	United States	20 April 2008	1 January 2009	Transferred to South Central Region
Ohio Roller Girls	Columbus, OH	United States	2006	1 January 2009	Transferred to North Central Region
Omaha Rollergirls	Omaha, NE	United States	9 September 2008	1 January 2009	Transferred to North Central Region
Windy City Rollers	Chicago, IL	United States	2006	1 January 2009	Transferred to North Central Region

== Rankings ==
Current Official WFTDA Regional Rankings as of January 29, 2013

Region	East
1	Gotham Roller Derby
2	Philly Rollergirls
3	Charm City Roller Girls
4	London Roller Derby
5	Montreal Roller Derby
6	Boston Derby Dames
7	DC Rollergirls
8	Carolina Rollergirls
9	Steel City Derby Demons
10	Dutchland Derby Rollers
11	Maine Roller Derby
12	New Hampshire Roller Derby
13	Queen City Roller Girls
14	Columbia Quad Squad
15	Dominion Derby Girls
16	Suburbia Roller Derby
17	Long Island Roller Rebels
18	Providence Roller Derby
19	CT RollerGirls
20	Roc City Roller Derby
21	River City Rollergirls
22	Cape Fear Roller Girls
23	Bear City Roller Derby
24	Rideau Valley Roller Girls
25	Central New York Roller Derby
26	Ithaca League of Women Rollers
27	Garden State Rollergirls
28	Green Mountain Derby Dames
29	Lowcountry Highrollers
30	Charlotte Roller Girls
31	Lehigh Valley Rollergirls
32	NRV Rollergirls
33	Jersey Shore Roller Girls
34	Harrisburg Area Roller Derby
35	Auld Reekie Roller Derby
36	Hudson Valley Horrors
37	Rocktown Rollers

Member teams unranked at this time:

- Black Rose Rollers
- Central City Roller Derby
- Charlottesville Derby Dames
- Crime City Rollers
- Diamond State Roller Girls
- Go-GO Gent Roller Derby
- Glasgow Roller Derby
- Hellions of Troy Roller Derby
- Helsinki Roller Derby
- Lincolnshire Bombers Roller Derby
- Mason-Dixon Roller Vixens
- Royal Windsor Roller Derby
- Stockholm Roller Derby

== Region Champions ==
- 2007 - Gotham Girls Roller Derby
- 2008 - Gotham Girls Roller Derby
- 2009 - Philly Roller Girls
- 2010 - Gotham Girls Roller Derby
- 2011 - Gotham Girls Roller Derby
- 2012 - Gotham Girls Roller Derby

== Hydra Trophy winners produced ==
- 2008 - Gotham Girls Roller Derby
- 2011 - Gotham Girls Roller Derby
- 2012 - Gotham Girls Roller Derby

== East Region titles won by league ==
League	Number of Championships Won	Last Year Won
Gotham Roller Derby	5	2011
Philly Rollergirls	1	2009

== See also ==
- West Region
- North Central Region
- South Central Region
