= Green Mountain Roller Derby =

Roller derby league

- Metro area: Burlington, VT
- Country: United States
- Founded: 2007
- Teams: Grade A Fancy (A team); Black Ice Brawlers (B team)
- Track type(s): Flat
- Venue: Champlain Valley Exposition
- Affiliations: WFTDA
- Website: www.gmrollerderby.com

Green Mountain Roller Derby (GMRD) is a women's flat track roller derby league based in Burlington, Vermont. Founded in 2007, Green Mountain is a member of the Women's Flat Track Derby Association (WFTDA).

== History ==
Green Mountain had their first home bout in February 2009, were accepted into the Women's Flat Track Derby Association Apprentice Program in September 2009, and gained full membership of the WFTDA the following September.

By 2010, the league had around 30 skaters. It remained Vermont's only women's flat track roller derby league, and attracted sell-out crowds of around 1,500 people to its bouts.

Green Mountain's old logo

In September 2012, Green Mountain co-hosted (with Montreal Roller Derby) the WFTDA Eastern Regional Tournament in Essex Junction, Vermont, with the Gotham Girls Roller Derby All-Stars of New York City being the winning team.

Originally formed as Green Mountain Derby Dames, in May 2015 the league changed its name to Green Mountain Roller Derby, dropping the gender-specific “Dames” from its moniker. It has two teams, which compete against teams from other leagues.

== WFTDA rankings ==
Season	Final ranking	Playoffs	Championship
2011	22 E	DNQ	DNQ
2012	28 E	DNQ	DNQ
2013	64 WFTDA	DNQ	DNQ
2014	75 WFTDA	DNQ	DNQ
2015	71 WFTDA	DNQ	DNQ
2016	113 WFTDA	DNQ	DNQ
