= Charm City Roller Derby =

Roller derby league

- Metro area: Baltimore, Maryland
- Country: United States
- Founded: 2005
- Dissolved: 2023
- Teams: All-Stars (A team); Female Trouble (B team); Trouble Makers (C team); Dundalk Deviants; Hampden Hons; Pigtown Butchers
- Track type: Flat
- Venue: Home season: Skateland North Point, Dundalk Travel season: The Garden's Ice House, Laurel
- Affiliations: WFTDA
- Org. type: LLC
- Website: charmcityrollerderby.org

Charm City Roller Derby (CCRD), was a flat track roller derby league in Baltimore, Maryland. Founded in 2005, Charm City is a member of the Women's Flat Track Derby Association (WFTDA).

== History and league structure ==
The league was established in 2005 as Charm City Roller Girls, when Caroline Donaghy returned to Baltimore from Houston, where she had skated with the Space City Roller Girls, and began promoting the intention to start a league in Baltimore. The first public Charm City game was held in 2006 at Skateland in Putty Hill. Upon the league's formation, it comprised four teams: the Junkyard Dolls, the Mobtown Mods, the Night Terrors and the Speed Regime. As early as 2008, games were being held at the Fifth Regiment Armory in Baltimore, and by 2009, the league was holding games at Du Burns Arena in Canton before sellout crowds of 2,000 fans.

As of 2017, Charm City has three travel teams: the All-Stars represent the league in WFTDA competition, and Female Trouble and the Trouble Makers are B and C teams, respectively. A three-team home league features the Dundalk Deviants, Hampden Hons and Pigtown Butchers. The All-Stars are known for wearing helmets that feature elements of the state flag of Maryland, which they first donned in 2008. Charm City Roller Derby operates as a limited liability company.

League member Joy Collision was a member of Team USA, representing the United States at the 2011 Roller Derby World Cup.

The league dissolved in 2023.

== WFTDA competition ==
Charm City was announced as a new member of the WFTDA in May 2007. The Charm City All-Stars first competed at WFTDA Playoffs in 2008 as the sixth seed at the Eastern Regional, where they won their opening game against Cincinnati Rollergirls, lost their quarterfinal to the Windy City Rollers but recovered to defeat Detroit to finish in fifth place. In 2009 at the Eastern Regional, Charm City won their opener against DC Rollergirls but then lost their semifinal to Philly Roller Girls to put them in the third-place game, which they lost 156-143 to Boston to finish in fourth place.

In 2010, an opening round win over Steel City was followed by a loss to Gotham Girls Roller Derby to put them in the third-place game again, this time beating Boston 162-128 to finish third and qualify for WFTDA Championships for the first time. At Championships, Charm City won their opening game against Minnesota Rollergirls 249-118, but then lost their quarterfinal to Rocky Mountain Rollergirls 165-103 to end their weekend. At the 2011 East Regional (co-hosted by Charm City and DC Rollergirls at Du Burns Arena), the All-Stars defeated Steel City 189-94 to again finish in third place and advance to Championships. At Championships, Charm City lost 160-121 to Minnesota in the opening round. At the 2012 East Regional, Charm City finished in third place for the third straight year, via a 183-159 victory over London Rollergirls, and again qualified for Championships. At Championships, a 268-141 loss to Denver in the opening round eliminated the All-Stars.

In 2013, the WFTDA restructured the Playoff system, and Charm City qualified as the ninth seed for Division 1 Playoffs in Salem, Oregon, where upset losses to Detroit and Sacred City Derby Girls put the All-Stars in the ninth-place game against the Chicago Outfit, which they won, 189-177. At the 2014 Division 1 Playoff in Salt Lake City, fourth-seeded Charm City finished in fourth place with a 183-156 loss to Rocky Mountain. In 2015 at Tucson, Charm City was the fifth seed but dropped down to an eighth-place finish with a 191-165 loss to Team United Roller Derby. In 2016, Charm City dropped into Division 2 for the first time, albeit as the top seed at the Playoff in Lansing, but were eliminated from Division 2 Championships contention with an upset loss to Calgary, 216-191. Charm City earned third place with a narrow 197-194 win over Wasatch Roller Derby. Charm City returned to Division 1 Playoffs in 2017 at Malmö as the twelfth seed, but lost both their games to Helsinki Roller Derby (308-144) and Rainy City Roller Derby (258-78) to finish outside of the medals.

In 2018, Charm qualified for the WFTDA North American East Continental Cup held in Kalamazoo, Michigan as the eighth seed, but after losing their opening game to North Star Roller Derby 259-176 finished out of the medals.

=== Rankings ===
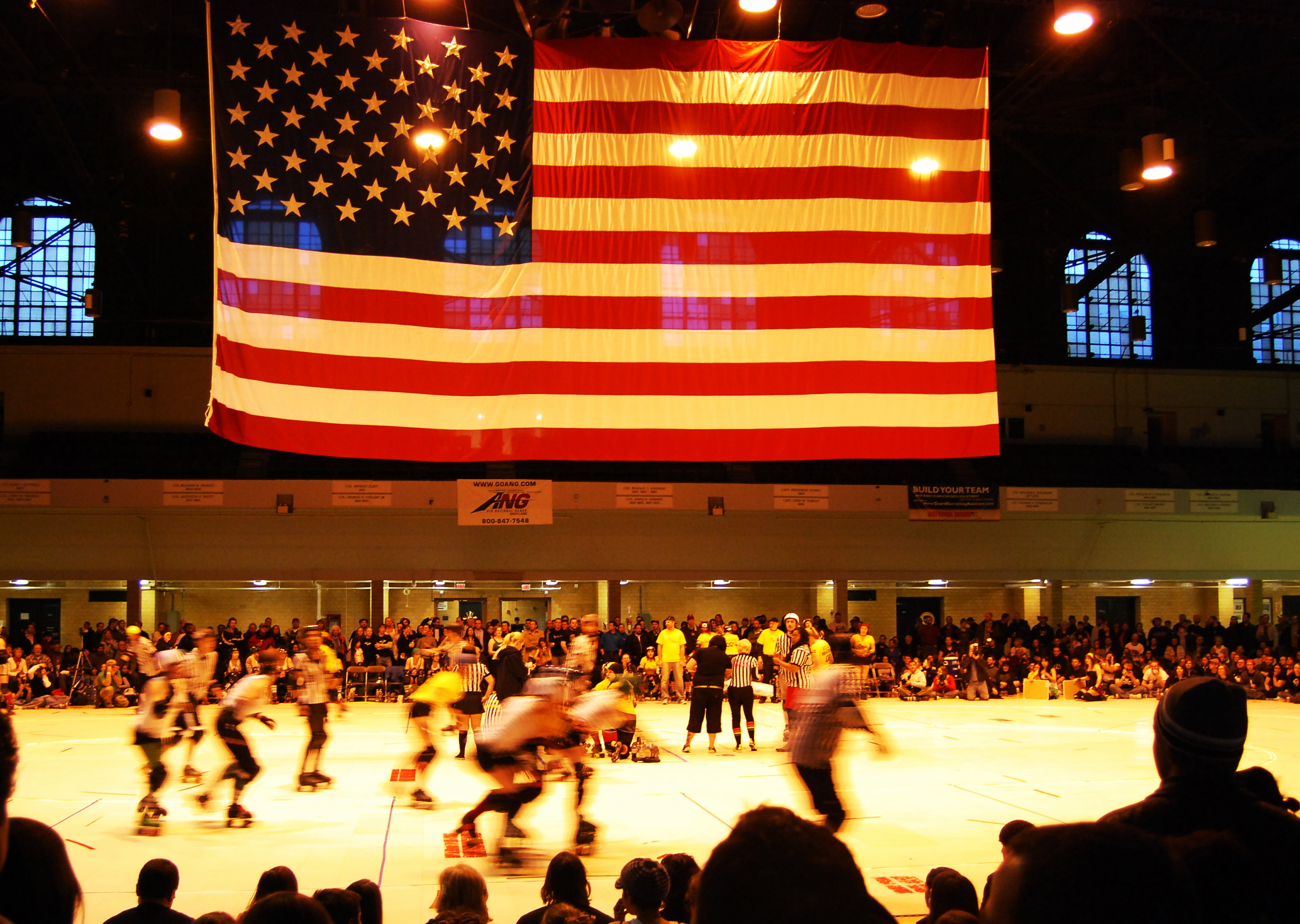
The All-Stars in action in 2007 at the Fifth Regiment Armory in Baltimore

Season	Final ranking	Playoffs	Championship
2007	22 WFTDA	DNQ	DNQ
2008	4 E	5 E	DNQ
2009	4 E	4 E	DNQ
2010	3 E	3 E	QF
2011	3 E	3 E	R1
2012	3 E	3 E	R1
2013	25 WFTDA	9 D1	DNQ
2014	14 WFTDA	4 D1	DNQ
2015	26 WFTDA	8 D1	DNQ
2016	34 WFTDA	3 D2	DNQ
2017	44 WFTDA	CR D1	DNQ
2018	61 WFTDA	CR CC NA East	NA

- CR = consolation round
