= Hellions of Troy =

Roller derby league

Hellions of Troy Roller Derby
- Metro area: Capital District, New York
- Country: United States
- Founded: 2008
- Teams: Hellions (A team); Trojan Force (B team)
- Track type: Flat
- Venue: Bethlehem YMCA Delmar, New York
- Affiliations: WFTDA
- Website: www.gohellions.com

Hellions of Troy Roller Derby (HoTRD) is a flat track roller derby league based in the Capital District in New York State. Founded in 2008, the league is a member of the Women's Flat Track Derby Association (WFTDA).

== History ==
Former league logo

The Hellions was formed in 2008 by skaters who had split from Albany All Stars Roller Derby and spent the winter practicing and bouting at the Fun Spot in Glens Falls. Negotiations for the Hellions 2009 summer season at the Glens Falls Civic Center began in October 2008 and continued through the Hellions' December bout against the Green Mountain Derby Dames and into 2009. In March 2009, the league announced its inaugural six-bout season in Troy. The Hellions currently host bouts at the Bethlehem YMCA in Delmar, New York, and play under the WFTDA ruleset. The league is skater owned and operated, with members running all aspects of league management, including bout production, coaching, public relations, and merchandising.

== Structure ==
The Hellions of Troy Roller Derby League consists of both an A team and a B team, the Hellions and the Trojan Force respectively. The Trojan Force made their debut in the 2012 season, under the name The Herculadies. The B team name change to the Trojan Force was announced in March of 2024. The name was changed to better represent the members of the team.

In October 2011, the Hellions became an apprentice member of the Women's Flat Track Derby Association, and became a full member in December 2012.

== WFTDA rankings ==
Season	Final ranking	Playoffs	Championship
2013	128 WFTDA	DNQ	DNQ
2014	124 WFTDA	DNQ	DNQ
2015	260 WFTDA	DNQ	DNQ
2016	229 WFTDA	DNQ	DNQ
2017	195 WFTDA	DNQ	DNQ
2018	159 WFTDA	DNQ	DNQ
2019	161 WFTDA	DNQ	DNQ
2020	163 WFTDA	DNQ	DNQ
2021-2022	Cancelled due to Covid-19	N/A	N/A
2023	69 NAE	DNQ	DNQ
2024	91 NAE	DNQ	DNQ
2025	64 NAE	DNQ	DNQ
2026	52 NAE	DNQ	DNQ

In 2023, WFTDA made changes to their rankings system, moving away from a global ranking system and into a regional one. The Hellions were placed in the North American Northeast (NAE) region. As of November 2026, the Hellions were ranked 52th overall in the NAE.
