= New Hampshire Roller Derby =

Roller derby league

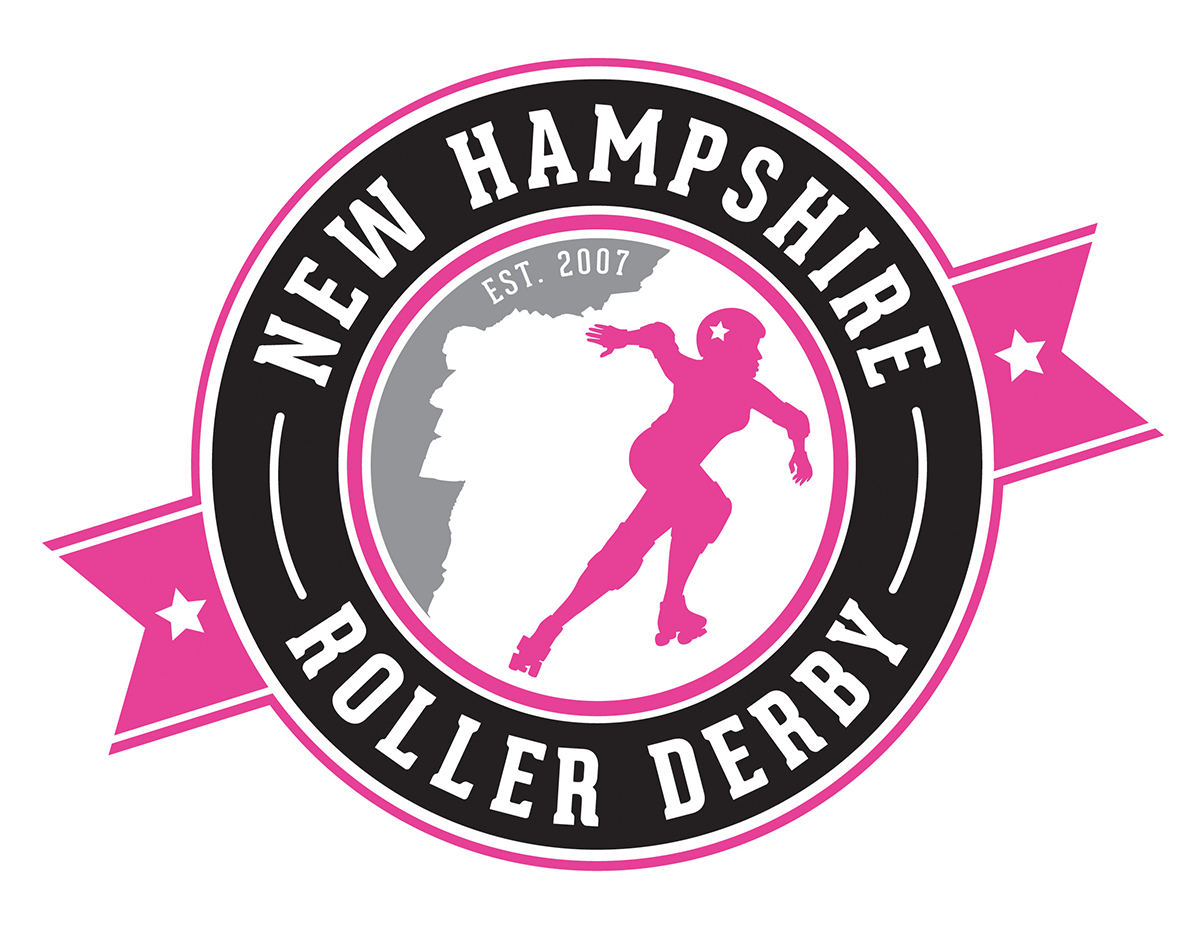
- Metro area: Hillsborough County, New Hampshire
- Country: United States
- Founded: 2007
- Teams: NH Roller Derby All-Stars; NH Roller Derby Cherry Bombs
- Track type: Flat
- Venue: JFK Memorial Coliseum; Manchester, NH
- Affiliations: WFTDA
- Org. type: not-for-profit LLC
- Website: www.nhrollerderby.com

New Hampshire Roller Derby is the first women's amateur roller derby league in New Hampshire. NHRD is a member of the Women's Flat Track Derby Association.

== League history ==
The league was founded in July 2007 as Skate Free or Die Rollergirls, in southern New Hampshire, but now operates under the name New Hampshire Roller Derby.

In the summer of 2008, their Skate Free or Die! all-star team had their first scrimmage against Providence Roller Derby's Killah Bees in July, hosted their first tournament in August, and saw their first bout, against Maine Roller Derby's Calamity Janes, in September. The league played its first full-length season in 2009. (See Competitive History)

On September 1, 2009, NHRD was accepted into the WFTDA Apprenticeship Program with the first round of inductees. The league graduated from the Apprentice Program and was inducted as a Class B member of WFTDA on June 17, 2010.

== Organization ==
The league is composed of several teams including an all-star travel team that competes with other leagues in the surrounding area. The league operates as a 501(c)(3) not-for-profit organization. All proceeds after paying operating costs such as venue rental fees are donated to charity. Groups that the New Hampshire Roller Derby has donated to include the American Red Cross, Animal Rescue League, NH Food Bank, Boston Area Rape Crisis Center, Save Giovanni's Friends, and Greyhound Pets of America.

== Teams ==
New Hampshire Roller Derby had grown to more than 50 members by 2009, and has featured a variety of teams within the league beginning with the 2010 season.

=== Travel teams ===
The Skate Free or Die All-Stars (SFOD) were NHRD's only team for the first two-and-a-half years of the league's existence. SFOD functioned as the league's A-Level, WFTDA-chartered travel team, eligible for national ranking and participation in WFTDA tournaments. They have played bouts throughout the northeastern United States and southeastern Canada as far away as Delaware and Montreal. In 2015 SFOD changed their name to the New Hampshire Roller Derby All-Stars, still functioning as an A-Level, WFTDA-chartered travel team. The team's colors are pink and black.

Formed in early 2010, the Queen City Cherry Bombs (QCCB) are NHRD's B-Level travel team which competes in regulation games as The New Hampshire Roller Derby Cherry Bombs.

==== Home Teams ====
The Nightmares on Elm Street, and the Granite Skate Troopers are currently two of NHRD's intra-league home teams. They play against each other at home at the JFK Coliseum in Manchester, NH and occasionally in exhibition bouts.

The Seabrook Meltdowns were formed in early 2010 but are since a retired team. They played intra-league home and exhibition bouts against the league's other home teams, the Granite Skate Troopers and the Nightmares on Elm Street. The team's colors were lime green and black.

== Competitive history ==
=== 2009 ===
Overall Record: 5–3

| NHRD Team | Opponent |
|---|---|
| Skate Free or Die (78) | @ Albany (144) |
| @ Skate Free or Die (86) | Providence Killah Bees (75) |
| Skate Free or Die (51) | @ Montreal Sexpos (13) |
| @ Skate Free or Die (93) | Central New York Utica Clubbers (30) |
| Skate Free or Die (50) | @ Providence Killah Bees (150) |
| @ Skate Free or Die (93) | Garden State Brick City Bruisers (53) |
| Skate Free or Die (64) | @ Wilmington City (173) |
| Skate Free or Die (149) | @ Garden State Brick City Bruisers (47) |

=== 2010 ===
Overall Record:
Skate Free or Die!: 4–3
Queen City Cherry Bombs: 3–2

| NHRD Team | Opponent |
|---|---|
| Skate Free or Die (79) | @ Green Mountain Derby Dames' Grade A Fancy (72) |
| @ Skate Free or Die (33) | Garden State Rollergirls' Ironbound Maidens (117) |
| @ Queen City Cherry Bombs (17) | Central Mass Roller Derby's Petticoat Punishers (40) |
| Skate Free or Die (80) | @ Central New York Roller Derby's Utica Clubbers (56) |
| @ Skate Free or Die (46) | Pioneer Valley Roller Derby's Western Mass Destruction (134) |
| @ Queen City Cherry Bombs (56) | Roc City Roller Derby's 5H85s (59) |
| Queen City Cherry Bombs (63) | @ Connecticut Roller Girls' Yankee Brutals (53) |
| Queen City Cherry Bombs (133) | @ Green Mountain Derby Dames' Black Ice Brawlers (61) |
| Skate Free or Die (158) | @ Green Mountain Derby Dames' Grade A Fancy (70) |
| @ Queen City Cherry Bombs (95) | Elm City Derby Damez (17) |
| @ Skate Free or Die (158) | Lehigh Valley Roller Derby's Hissy Fits (120) |
| Skate Free or Die (105) | Dutchland Derby Rollers' Dutchland Blitz (140) |

=== Rankings ===
| Season | Final ranking | Playoffs | Championship |
|---|---|---|---|
| 2011 | 26 | DNQ | DNQ |
| 2012 | 12 | DNQ | DNQ |

== See also ==
- List of roller derby leagues
- Women's Flat Track Derby Association
