= Suburbia Roller Derby =

Roller derby league

- Metro area: Yonkers, NY
- Country: United States
- Founded: June 2007
- Teams: Suburban Brawl (A team); Backyard Bullies (B team)
- Track type: Flat
- Venue: EJ Murray Memorial Skating Center, Yonkers, New York; Yonkers Police Athletic League, Yonkers, New York (2007–2022)
- Affiliations: WFTDA
- Website: subrd.com

Suburbia Roller Derby (SRD) is a roller derby league based in Yonkers, New York. Founded in 2007, Suburbia Roller Derby is a member of the Women's Flat Track Derby Association.

== History ==
Suburbia was founded in by Slim Fast and Suffah Kate, two former members of the CT RollerGirls. The league has three home teams, plus two travel teams which compete against teams from other leagues.

The league began bouting in late 2007 and, by mid-2008, it had more than thirty skaters. In February 2009, it became a member of the Women's Flat Track Derby Association, and in 2010, it hosted "Derby in the Burbs", that year's WFTDA Eastern Regional Tournament. In 2013, Suburbia qualified for WFTDA Playoffs for the first time, as the tenth seed at the Division 2 tournament in Kalamazoo, Michigan. Suburbia went winless for the weekend, including a 233-221 loss to Queen City Roller Girls, to finish in tenth place. Suburbia returned to Division 2 Playoffs in 2014 as the ninth seed at the tournament in Duluth, Minnesota. Suburbia made it to the fifth place game but lost to Treasure Valley Rollergirls 236-111 and finished in sixth place.

== Rankings ==
Season	Final ranking	Playoffs	Championship
2009	15 E	DNQ	DNQ
2010	14 E	DNQ	DNQ
2011	12 E	DNQ	DNQ
2012	16 E	DNQ	DNQ
2013	58 WFTDA	10 D2	DNQ
2014	55 WFTDA	6 D2	DNQ
2015	94 WFTDA	DNQ	DNQ
2016	217 WFTDA	DNQ	DNQ
2017	330 WFTDA	DNQ	DNQ
2018	302 WFTDA	DNQ	DNQ
2019	271 WFTDA	DNQ	DNQ
2020	268 WFTDA	DNQ	DNQ
