= Connecticut Roller Derby =

Roller derby league

- Metro area: Naugatuck, Connecticut
- Country: United States
- Founded: 2006
- Teams: CT All Stars (A team); The Yankee Brutals (B team); Home teams: The Bone Crushers; The Iron Angels; The Widowmakers
- Track type: Flat
- Venue: Roller Magic (Waterbury, Connecticut)
- Affiliations: WFTDA
- Org. type: Non Profit Organization
- Website: http://www.ctrollerderby.com/

Connecticut Roller Derby is a women's flat-track roller derby league based in Naugatuck (Greater Waterbury), Connecticut. Founded in 2006, the league reached its 10th anniversary in 2016. Connecticut Roller Derby is a member of the Women's Flat Track Derby Association (WFTDA).

== History and league structure ==
Connecticut Roller Derby was launched as "CT RollerGirls" in March 2006, and by early 2009 was attracting up to 500 fans to games held at venues such as the Connecticut Sports Center.

Connecticut Roller Derby has travel teams and home teams. The home teams play each other, and are the Bone Crushers, the Iron Angels, and the Widowmakers, whereas the two travel teams, The CT All-Stars and The Yankee Brutals, play teams from other leagues, with the All-Stars representing the league at the WFTDA level.

== WFTDA competition ==
CT RollerGirls became a member of the Women's Flat Track Derby Association in early 2007, announced by the WFTDA in May of that year. In 2009, the CT All-Stars qualified for the WFTDA Playoffs for the first time. Entering the WFTDA Eastern Regional Tournament as the eighth seed, the All-Stars opened their tournament with losses to DC Rollergirls and Providence Roller Derby, before defeating Dominion Derby Girls 156–57 to finish the weekend in ninth place.

=== Rankings ===
Original CT RollerGirls logo

| Season | Final ranking | Playoffs | Championship |
|---|---|---|---|
| 2007 | NR | DNQ | DNQ |
| 2008 | 7 E | DNQ | DNQ |
| 2009 | 11 E | 9 E | DNQ |
| 2010 | 12 E | DNQ | DNQ |
| 2011 | 14 E | DNQ | DNQ |
| 2012 | 19 E | DNQ | DNQ |
| 2013 | 70 WFTDA | DNQ | DNQ |
| 2014 | 101 WFTDA | DNQ | DNQ |
| 2015 | 147 WFTDA | DNQ | DNQ |
| 2016 | 190 WFTDA | DNQ | DNQ |
| 2017 | 124 WFTDA | DNQ | DNQ |
| 2018 | 102 WFTDA | DNQ | DNQ |
| 2024 | 15 WFTDA | DNQ | DNQ |
2025
| 2026 | 43 WFTDA | | |

- NR = no end-of-year ranking supplied

== Scholarship program ==
As part of Connecticut Roller Derby's community outreach mandate, the league sponsors a scholarship each year, the Cindy Luberto Scholarship for Women Athletes, which is a $500.00 grant towards post-secondary education.
