= Black Rose Rollers =

Roller derby league

- Metro area: Hanover, PA
- Country: United States
- Founded: 2010
- Teams: All Stars (A team), Riveters (B team), Black Rose Rebellion (Juniors)
- Track type: Flat
- Venue: Magic Elm Skateland
- Affiliations: WFTDA
- Website: blackroserollers.com

Black Rose Rollers (BRR) is a women's flat track roller derby league based in Hanover, Pennsylvania. Founded in 2010, Black Rose is a member of the Women's Flat Track Derby Association (WFTDA).

== History and organization ==
The league was founded in May 2010 by a group of women, including Kim Underwood (known as "Gogo Tenenbomb"). They lacked skating experience, but were inspired by the movie Whip It. It played its first public bout in June 2011, against Harrisburg Area Roller Derby's Fallout Femmes, and was accepted into the Women's Flat Track Derby Association Apprentice Program in January 2012. They graduated to full membership of the WFTDA in December 2012.

As of 2022, the league consists of two teams, the All-Stars and the Riveters, who compete against teams from other leagues. The league has attracted attention for its charitable fundraising.

The league also has a junior roller derby team, Black Rose Rebellion, who play by the JRDA ruleset.

== Rankings ==
Season	Final ranking	Playoffs	Championship
2013	133 WFTDA	DNQ	DNQ
2014	129 WFTDA	DNQ	DNQ
2015	189 WFTDA	DNQ	DNQ
2016	159 WFTDA	DNQ	DNQ
2017	149 WFTDA	DNQ	DNQ
2018	123 WFTDA	DNQ	DNQ
2019	126 WFTDA	DNQ	DNQ
