= Hudson Valley Horrors Roller Derby =

Roller derby league

- Metro area: Hyde Park, New York
- Country: United States
- Founded: 2006
- Teams: Horrors (A team) zomBsquad (B team); Frightmares (junior team)
- Track type: Flat
- Venue: Hyde Park Roller Magic
- Affiliations: WFTDA
- Website: www.horrorsrollerderby.com

Hudson Valley Horrors Roller Derby (HVHRD) is a women's flat track roller derby league based in Hyde Park, New York. Founded in 2006, the league consists of two teams which compete against teams from other leagues. Hudson Valley is a member of the Women's Flat Track Derby Association (WFTDA).

== History ==
Hudson Valley Horrors Roller Derby was founded in 2006 by Jeshurun Nickerson, also known as Rxy Ramalotte. After Nickerson watched the A&E show Rollergirls. With the help of co-founder Karen Locker (Scarlet Bloodletter) flyers were created and distributed throughout their local community. The first league practice drew in eleven skaters, and regular practices ensued from that point on.

After a year of training, HVHRD hosted its first exhibition bout in February 2007 on a makeshift rink under a bridge. Its first bout against another team was a few months later in June 2007 against Pioneer Valley Roller Derby.

By 2009, the league had enough skaters to establish two travel teams, the Horrors being the league's A team and the zomBsquad as a B team. The growth lead to a men's team being formed and a junior team, the Frightmares.

The league was accepted into the Women's Flat Track Derby Association Apprentice Program in November 2009, and became a full WFTDA member in December 2010.

The league describes itself as "the world's first non-urban, flat-track women's roller derby league".

=== WFTDA competition ===
Season	Final ranking	Playoffs	Championship
2011	28 E	DNQ	DNQ
2012	36 E	DNQ	DNQ
2013	160 WFTDA	DNQ	DNQ
2014	177 WFTDA	DNQ	DNQ
2015	233 WFTDA	DNQ	DNQ
2016	NR	DNQ	DNQ
2017	NR	DNQ	DNQ
2018	NR	DNQ	DNQ
2019	NR	DNQ	DNQ
2023	97 NA Northeast	DNQ	DNQ
2024	NR	DNQ	DNQ

- no WFTDA rankings from 2020-2022 due to COVID-19 pandemic
