= Lehigh Valley Roller Derby =

Roller derby league

- Metro area: Bethlehem, Pennsylvania
- Country: United States
- Founded: 2006
- Teams: All-Stars (A Team); Blast Furnace Betties - Home Team; Metal Vixens - Home Team
- Track type(s): Flat Track, Wooden, Concrete
- Venue: Bethlehem Municipal Ice Rink
- Affiliations: WFTDA
- Org. type: 501(c)(3) non-profit
- Website: www.lehighvalleyrollergirls.com

Lehigh Valley Roller Derby (LVRD) is a women's flat track roller derby league based in Bethlehem, Pennsylvania in the Lehigh Valley region of eastern Pennsylvania. The league is a member of the Women's Flat Track Derby Association (WFTDA).

== History ==
Founded as Lehigh Valley Rollergirls in January 2006, the league was the first skater-operated flat track roller derby league in the area. Lehigh Valley was founded by Elaina Borchelt. Lehigh Valley joined the WFTDA Apprentice Program in 2009, and became a full member of the WFTDA in 2010. In 2014 the league was averaging 300 fans at home games at the Independence Family Fun Center in Schnecksville.

The league now hosts home games at Bethlehem Municipal Ice Rink in Bethlehem, Pennsylvania.

== Teams ==
In 2009, the league expanded to a three-team structure, with the Blast Furnace Betties and Metal Vixens home teams feeding the All-Stars, who represent Lehigh Valley against teams from other leagues.

== WFTDA rankings ==
Season	Final ranking	Playoffs	Championship
2011	24 E	DNQ	DNQ
2012	31 E	DNQ	DNQ
2013	122 WFTDA	DNQ	DNQ
2014	133 WFTDA	DNQ	DNQ
2015	131 WFTDA	DNQ	DNQ
2016	112 WFTDA	DNQ	DNQ
2017	150 WFTDA	DNQ	DNQ
2018	135 WFTDA	DNQ	DNQ

== See also ==
- List of roller derby leagues
- Women's Flat Track Derby Association
