= Youngstown Area Roller Derby =

Roller derby league

- Metro area: Youngstown, OH
- Country: United States
- Founded: 2008
- Teams: Youngstown Area Roller Derby; Rustbelt Rollers (inactive); Lawless Rollers (inactive)
- Track type: Flat
- Affiliations: WFTDA
- Website: https://youngstownarearollerderby.com/

Youngstown Area Roller Derby (YARD) (formerly known as the Little Steel Derby Girls) is a women's flat-track roller derby league based in Youngstown, Ohio. Founded in 2008, the league consisted of two teams which competed against teams from other leagues. As of 2025, YARD operates with one team roster. YARD is a member of the Women's Flat Track Derby Association (WFTDA) in the NA Northeast Division.

== History ==
The league was founded in December 2008 by Tifany Griffith, known as "Ground Zero". Little Steel won its first bout against a Steel City Derby Demons team, but progress was initially slow and it was only in October 2010 that it was ready to play its first home bout. By early 2011, the league had 24 skaters, and was aiming to join the Women's Flat Track Derby Association (WFTDA).

Little Steel was accepted into the WFTDA Apprentice Program in October 2011, and became a full member of the WFTDA in June 2012.

Little Steel rebranded in 2023 to become Youngstown Area Roller Derby to have a more inclusive name to bring in more skaters and to extend into co-ed competition in the future.

== WFTDA rankings ==
Season	Final ranking	Playoffs	Championship
2013	148 WFTDA	DNQ	DNQ
2014	187 WFTDA	DNQ	DNQ
2015	235 WFTDA	DNQ	DNQ
2016	315 WFTDA	DNQ	DNQ
2017	227 WFTDA	DNQ	DNQ
2018	189 WFTDA	DNQ	DNQ
2019	235 WFTDA	DNQ	DNQ
2024	122 NA Northeast	DNQ	DNQ

== In the media ==
Youngstown Area Roller Derby was featured in the Business Journal in 2025, interviewed and captured on video at practice.

Youngstown State University's student-run newspaper, The Jambar, featured YARD in 2022 when the team was still known as the Little Steel Derby Girls. The article talks with skaters Thunder Bottom (Brittany Carter) and Road Rage (Angie Helmick Hampson) about the game and their personal experiences with the sport.

In 2017, the Tribune Chronicle interviewed skaters about the league's structure, their personal experiences with the sport, and the team's community outreach of collecting donations for local charities.
