= River City Roller Derby =

Roller derby league

- Metro area: Richmond, Virginia
- Country: United States
- Founded: 2006
- Teams: River City Riot; River City River Rats; Poe's Punishers; Hollywood Undertakers
- Track type: Flat
- Venue: Greater Richmond Convention Center
- Affiliations: WFTDA
- Org. type: 501(c)(3)
- Website: rivercityrollerderby.com

River City Roller Derby (RCRD) is a women's flat track roller derby league based in Richmond, Virginia. The league was established in 2006 under the name River City Rollergirls and was composed of five teams: River City Riot, River City River Rats, River City Reapers, Hollywood Undertakers, and Poe's Punishers. As a result of skaters retiring or transferring to other teams, the league consolidated into one all-star travel team in 2014. In 2017, membership increased and two fully rostered teams were established: the Riots and Rats. The Riots and Rats skate in black and neon green. River City is a member of the Women's Flat Track Derby Association (WFTDA).

== All-star teams ==
- River City Riot
- First WFTDA certified team to feature two African-American captains: Paris Kills and Scarriett Tubman.
- Features a rookie training program.

Season	Q4 ranking	Playoffs	Championship
2010	16	DNQ	DNQ
2011	19	DNQ	DNQ

== Training team ==
- Hollywood Undertakers (red and black)
- Poe's Punishers (purple and black)
