= Dominion Derby Girls =

Roller derby league

- Metro area: Virginia Beach, Virginia
- Country: United States
- Founded: 2006
- Teams: All Stars (A team); Seven City Sirens (B team)
- Track type: Flat-track
- Venue: SK8 Dojo
- Affiliations: WFTDA
- Website: dominionderbygirls.com

Dominion Derby Girls (DDG) is a flat-track roller derby league based in Virginia Beach, Virginia. The Dominion Derby Girls is a member of the Women's Flat Track Derby Association (WFTDA).

== History and Organization ==
Dominion was established in 2006 and announced as a member of the WFTDA in May 2007.

Home bouts for DDG are held at the SK8 Dojo in Virginia Beach, their home skating rink. DDG participates in various charity and fundraising events around the Hampton Roads area, participating in the annual Polar Plunge, various Breast Cancer Awareness fundraisers. Additionally, DDG is proud to have partnered with many charitable organizations across Hampton Roads including Toys For Tots, Habitat for Humanity, Combat Wounded Coalition, Hope For Life Coalition, and St. Baldricks Foundation.

== WFTDA Competition ==
In 2008, Dominion qualified for the WFTDA Eastern Regional Tournament for the first time as the lowest seed, however they withdrew from the tournament in advance due to skater availability and costs. The following year, Dominion again qualified for the Eastern Regional Tournament, this time as the tenth seed, but lost all three of their games and ultimately finished in tenth place after a 156-57 loss to CT RollerGirls.

Today, DDG competes in the WFTDA North America Northeast region and is ranked 123 of 143 teams.

=== Rankings ===
Season	Final ranking	Playoffs	Championship
2008	6 E	DNP E	DNQ
2009	14 E	10 E	DNQ
2010	13 E	DNQ	DNQ
2011	16 E	DNQ	DNQ
2012	15 E	DNQ	DNQ
2013	118 WFTDA	DNQ	DNQ
2014	165 WFTDA	DNQ	DNQ
2015	186 WFTDA	DNQ	DNQ
2016	125 WFTDA	DNQ	DNQ

== Teams ==
=== Active Teams ===
The Dominion Derby Girls league is composed of two teams which play interleague bouts: the All Stars and the Seven City Sirens (B-team). The All Stars compete with other WFTDA member teams in sanctioned bouts for rankings. The Sirens compete against other leagues' B-teams or WFTDA apprentice leagues.

=== Former Teams ===
In previous years DDG has had home teams who competed against each other and were composed of skaters from both the All Stars and Seven City Sirens. Those teams included the St. Brawli Girls, Dirty Diesel Darlins, and Femmes Fatales. As of the 2012 season, the home teams had been dissolved.
