= Shriners Auditorium =

Indoor arena in Wilmington, Massachusetts

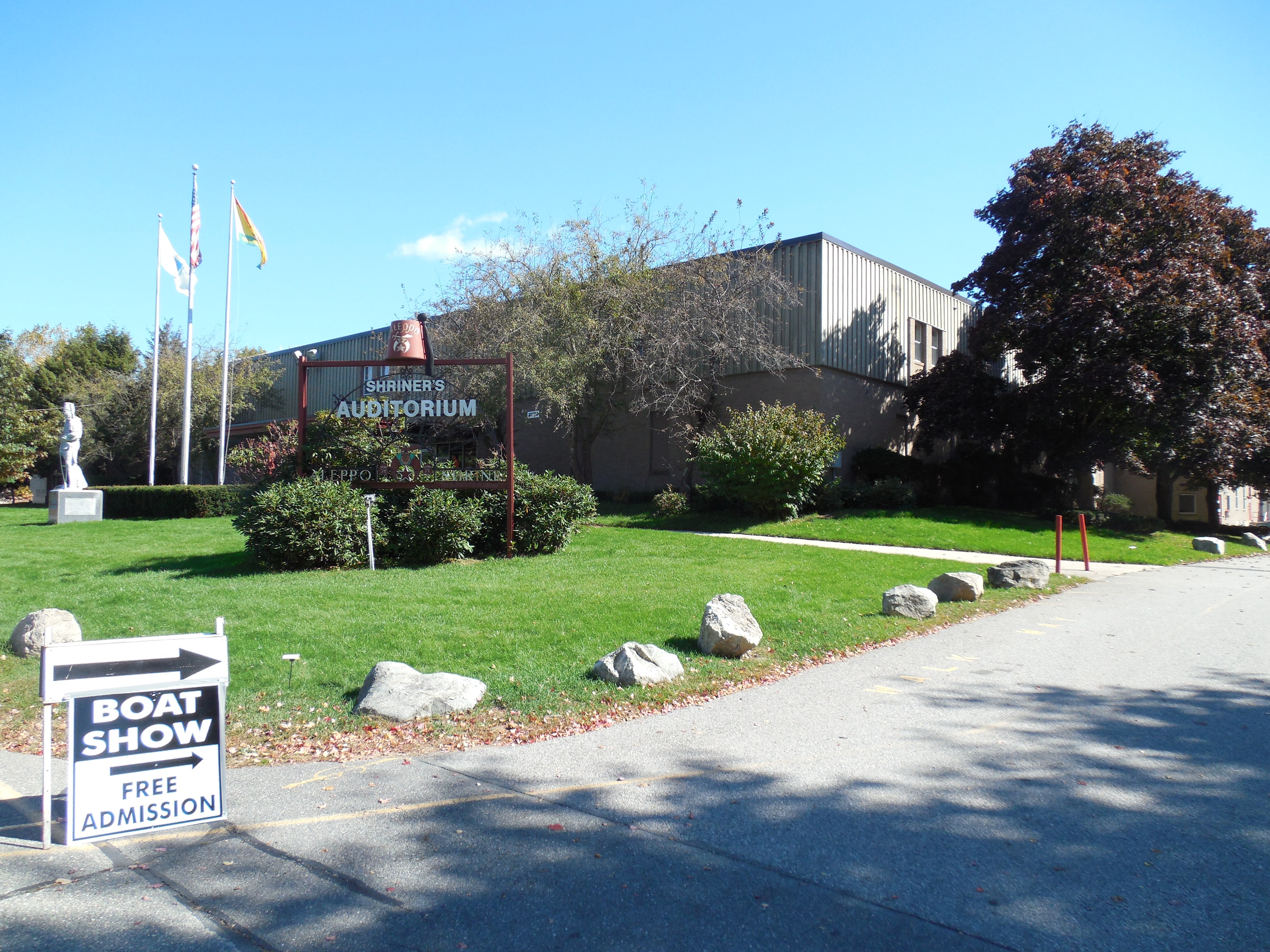
- Shriners Auditorium
- Interactive map of Shriners Auditorium
- Location: 99 Fordham Road; Wilmington, Massachusetts
- Coordinates: 42°34′4″N 71°8′8″W
- Owner: Aleppo Shriners
- Capacity: 4,150

Construction
- Opened: 1977

Tenant
- Boston Roller Derby

Website
- www.alepposhriners.com

Shriners Auditorium is a 2,650-seat indoor arena located in Wilmington, Massachusetts. It was built in 1977 as the headquarters for the Aleppo Shriners, who had been based in Boston, Massachusetts since 1882. The Aleppo Shriners still own the auditorium today. It is also the home of the Boston Roller Derby roller derby league.

The facility features 37,000 square feet (3,400 m^{2}) of exhibit space in the arena and 11,600 square feet (1,080 m^{2}) of meeting space in three meeting rooms. Its main lobby features 3,300 square feet (310 m^{2}) of space. It can seat up to 4,150 for boxing, wrestling, mixed martial arts and concerts, among other events. As of February 2009, all mma events promoted by World Championship Fighting have been hosted there. Trade shows, sporting events, conventions, banquets and the Shrine Circus are also held at the facility.

The building is wheelchair accessible and has a 24-foot (7 m) ceiling height. Because of its location in an office park off I-93, there is plenty of parking, including 1,500 in its own parking lot.
