= Central New York Roller Derby =

Roller derby league

- Metro area: Utica, New York
- Country: United States
- Founded: 2007
- Teams: CNY All-Stars (Travel); Wonder Brawlers (B team)
- Track type: Flat
- Venue: John F. Kennedy Civic Arena in Rome, NY
- Affiliations: WFTDA (East region)
- Website: http://www.cnyrollerderby.com/

Central New York Roller Derby (CNYRD) is a women's flat-track roller derby league in Utica, New York. Organized in late 2007, Central New York is a member of the Women's Flat Track Derby Association (WFTDA).

== History ==
In September 2009 the league was accepted into the Apprentice Program of the Women's Flat Track Derby Association (WFTDA), and in September 2010 they were accepted as a full member league. As of January 2011 the league had over 70 skaters who skated on three home teams, the Utica Clubbers, the Rome Wreckers, and the Blue Collar Betties. The best of those three home teams competed on the CNY All-Stars travel team, which competes for rankings in the WFTDA. The league has a B level team as well, the Wonder Brawlers, introduced in 2012.

In February 2012, the league's practice facility in Utica, SportsPlx, burned down, destroying much of the league's stored equipment and gear. Community fundraising, including a fashion show hosted at the Hamilton Center for the Arts helped get the organization back on its feet.

Starting in 2015, Central New York has hosted the now-annual Siege of CNY tournament, bringing in teams from as far away as Canada and England.

== WFTDA rankings ==
Season	Final ranking	Playoffs	Championship
2011	20 E	DNQ	DNQ
2012	25 E	DNQ	DNQ
2013	147 WFTDA	DNQ	DNQ
2014	155 WFTDA	DNQ	DNQ
2015	125 WFTDA	DNQ	DNQ
2016	158 WFTDA	DNQ	DNQ
2017	194 WFTDA	DNQ	DNQ
2018	192 WFTDA	DNQ	DNQ
