= Long Island Roller Rebels =

Roller derby league

- Metro area: New York
- Country: United States
- Teams: All Stars (A team); Rock-A-Betty Bruisers (B team)
- Track type: Flat
- Venue: Skate Safe America, Old Bethpage
- Affiliations: WFTDA
- Website: www.longislandrollerrebels.org

The Long Island Roller Rebels (LIRR) are a women's flat track roller derby league based on Long Island, New York. Founded in 2005, the league currently consists of two teams which compete against teams from other leagues. Long Island Roller Rebels is a member of the Women's Flat Track Derby Association (WFTDA).

== History and organization ==
Long Island Roller Rebels was founded as the "Rockabetty Bruisers" in mid-2005 by Lauren "Captain Morgan" Madonia and seven others. Aided in its early days by members of Gotham Girls Roller Derby, Long Island's first official game was held in February 2006. LIRR was announced as a new member of the Women's Flat Track Derby Association (WFTDA) in May 2007. They were early members of the WFTDA, competing in the East Region.

The league's travel teams have participated in interleague bouts against teams across the east coast of the United States, reaching as far as Maine. By 2009, their intraleague bouts were attracting around 350 to 400 fans to their regular venue, in Old Bethpage, New York, many of whom had previously watched banked track games. Their 2010 season featured a tournament involving twelve teams from New York State,

In 2011, the Roller Rebels competed in the East Coast Derby Extravaganza, and also played a bout at the Men's Roller Derby Association Championships, which were held in their Old Bethpage rink.

In March 2024 the Roller Rebels filed suit against Nassau County executive Bruce Blakeman over an executive order he had made banning women's sports teams that include transgender women from using county facilities. They are represented by the New York Civil Liberties Union.

== WFTDA rankings ==
Season	Final ranking	Playoffs	Championship
2009	16 E	DNQ	DNQ
2010	17 E	DNQ	DNQ
2011	21 E	DNQ	DNQ
2012	17 E	DNQ	DNQ
2013	76 WFTDA	DNQ	DNQ
2014	160 WFTDA	DNQ	DNQ
2015	152 WFTDA	DNQ	DNQ
2016	111 WFTDA	DNQ	DNQ
2017	74 WFTDA	DNQ	DNQ
