= Harrisburg Area Roller Derby =

Roller derby league

- Metro area: Harrisburg, PA
- Country: United States
- Founded: 2005
- Teams: Nuclear Knockouts (A team)
- Track type: Flat
- Venue: Olympic Skating Center
- Affiliations: WFTDA
- Website: harrisburgarearollerderby.com

Harrisburg Area Roller Derby (HARD) is a women's flat track roller derby league based in Harrisburg, Pennsylvania. Founded in 2005, as of 2017 it has a single team, which competes against teams from other leagues. Harrisburg Area Roller Derby is a member of the Women's Flat Track Derby Association (WFTDA).

== History ==
The league was founded by a group of women in January 2005. By early 2007, it had played three bouts, and was attracting crowds of several hundred people.

The league joined the Women's Flat Track Derby Association (WFTDA) in May 2008. It qualified for the 2009 WFTDA Eastern Regional Tournament, but was unable to field a team. By 2010, it had grown to more than forty skaters.

As of 2026, the head coach is Merry Khaos and the head referee is Pete in the Pool.

== WFTDA rankings ==
Season	Final ranking	Playoffs	Championship
2009	10 E	DNP E	DNQ
2010	15 E	DNQ	DNQ
2011	18 E	DNQ	DNQ
2012	34 E	DNQ	DNQ
2013	167 WFTDA	DNQ	DNQ
2014	NR	DNQ	DNQ
2015	254 WFTDA	DNQ	DNQ
2016	262 WFTDA	DNQ	DNQ
2017	339 WFTDA	DNQ	DNQ
2018	331 WFTDA	DNQ	DNQ
