= Philly Roller Derby =

Roller derby league

- Metro area: Philadelphia, PA
- Country: United States
- Founded: 2005
- Teams: Liberty Belles (A); Block Party (B); City Wide Specials (C); Germantown Loose Cannons; Passyunk Punks; West Philly Warriors; Philly Roller Derby Juniors
- Track type: Flat
- Venue: The Roller Jawn
- Affiliations: WFTDA
- Website: http://www.phillyrollerderby.com/

Philly Roller Derby (PRD) is a women's flat-track roller derby league based in Philadelphia, Pennsylvania. Founded in 2005, Philly Roller Derby is a founding member of the Women's Flat Track Derby Association (WFTDA).

== League history ==
First organized as the Philly Roller Girls in 2005, the league debuted in 2006 as a four-team home league, comprising the Broad Street Butchers, the Heavy Metal Hookers, the Hostile City Honeys and the Philthy Britches. The home teams competed for a league championship called the Warrior Cup. Later in 2006, Philly launched a travel team called the Liberty Belles, made of members of the home teams, that by November had hosted Gotham Girls Roller Derby (New York City) and traveled to face the Sin City Rollergirls (Las Vegas). Home events were held at Millennium Skate World in nearby Camden, New Jersey.

League logo pre-2015

In March 2007 Philly first hosted East Coast Derby Extravaganza (ECDX), an invitational weekend tournament at the Sportsplex in Feasterville (which had also become the league regular home) that hit its 10th anniversary event in 2016. By 2008, the Hostile Honeys had folded and the home league operated with three teams. In 2009, Philly moved into a temporary new home venue, the 23rd Street Armory, where they were consistently drawing sold-out crowds of over 700 fans per event.

Philly hosted the 2009 WFTDA Championships, dubbed "Declaration of Derby", at the Pennsylvania Convention Center. Philly again hosted Championships in 2017, at the Liacouras Center.

In early 2015, Philly announced an official name change to Philly Roller Derby, to both embrace gender inclusivity and to put the emphasis more on the sport than on the gender of those participating.

Philly hosted the 2017 WFTDA Championships at the Liacouras Center.

== Teams ==
As of 2016, Philly Roller Derby has four teams, which compete against teams from other roller derby leagues. The Liberty Belles are Philly's all-star travel team, and represent the league at the highest level of interleague competition in the WFTDA. The Independence Dolls represent PRD against WFTDA "B" level travel teams, up-and-coming WFTDA "A" level travel teams and non-WFTDA all-star teams. Members of the Independence Dolls serve as alternates for The Liberty Belles. Together, these 30 skaters make up PRD's International All-Star travel team contingent.

The Block Party represents Philly Roller Derby primarily against regional competitors. Considered a pick-up team, the Block Party is composed of skaters not already skating for the Liberty Belles or Independence Dolls who are interested in additional competitive playing time. The Cheeseskates is a team limited to first year Philly Roller Derby skaters (fresh meat or transfers).

PRD run a junior roller derby league, Philly Roller Derby Juniors, open to skaters from 6-18 years old who play by the JRDA ruleset.

=== Philly home team championship ===
Season	Champion	Second place	Third place
2006	Philthy Brithches	Broad Street Butchers	Heavy Metal Hookers
2007	Philthy Brithches	Broad Street Butchers	Heavy Metal Hookers
2008	Philthy Brithches	Broad Street Butchers	Heavy Metal Hookers
2009	Philthy Brithches	Heavy Metal Hookers	Broad Street Butchers
2010	Broad Street Butchers	Philthy Brithches	Heavy Metal Hookers
2011	Philthy Brithches	Broad Street Butchers	Heavy Metal Hookers
2012	Heavy Metal Hookers	Broad Street Butchers	Philthy Brithches
2013	NO Home Team		
2014	NO Home Team		
2015	NO Home Team		
2016	NO Home Team		
2017	Germantown Loose Cannons	Passssyunk Punks	West Philly Warriors
2018	Germantown Loose Cannons	Passssyunk Punks	West Philly Warriors
2019	Passssyunk Punks	Germantown Loose Cannons	West Philly Warriors
2020	COVID-19	COVID-19	COVID-19

== WFTDA competition ==
Philly's Liberty Belles first appeared at WFTDA Playoffs at the first WFTDA Eastern Regional Tournament, "Heartland Havoc" in Columbus, Ohio, where they were eliminated by Gotham in the second round. The following year in Madison, a narrow loss to Gotham in the semifinal put Philly in the third-place game at Eastern Regionals, which they won against Carolina Rollergirls 112-48 to qualify for WFTDA Championships for the first time. At Championships in Portland, Oregon, Philly opened with a narrow victory over Bay Area Derby Girls which matched them up - again - against Gotham in the semifinal, who won handily. Philly ultimately took third place with a 114-95 victory against Texas Rollergirls.

At the 2009 East Region Tournament "Wicked Wheels of the East" in Raleigh, the Liberty Belles finally defeated Gotham 90-89 to take first place. In 2009, PRG hosted the WFTDA Championships in Philadelphia, where the Philly Roller Girls had a bye past the first round due to their first-place regional seeding. In the quarterfinals, the Liberty Belles were defeated in overtime by the West #2 seed Rocky Mountain Rollergirls 128-121, eliminating them from the tournament.

In 2010, Philly again faced Gotham in the East Region Final, this time with Gotham winning 133-103, placing Philly in second. At the "Uproar on the Lakeshore" 2010 Championships in Chicago, the Liberty Belles defeated Mad Rollin' Dolls and the Kansas City Roller Warriors in the opening rounds, and then lost their semifinal to Oly Rollers, pitting them against Gotham in the third place game, which they lost 162-51 to finish in fourth place.

The Liberty Belles met Gotham for the fifth straight Eastern Regional Tournament in 2011, losing the final 252-97 to again finish in second place. At Championships, following an opening round victory over Naptown Roller Girls, Philly lost to Oly in the quarterfinals, 181-95. For the fourth straight year, Philly faced - and lost to - Gotham in the East Region final, to again finish the tournament in second place. At Champs, Philly lost in the opening round to Bay Area, 169-119.

Beginning in 2013, the WFTDA moved to a divisional system instead of geographic for playoff tournaments, and he Liberty Belles qualified for the 2013 Women's Flat Track Derby Association Division 1 playoff tournament in Richmond, Virginia, at which they finished in second place with a 253-210 loss to Texas. At that year's Championships in Milwaukee, Philly lost in the opening round to Windy City Rollers, 221-174. After finishing third at the 2014 Division 1 tournament in Charleston, the Liberty Belles lost to Denver Roller Dolls in the opening round of Championships, 148-139. In 2015, Philly missed WFTDA Championships for the first time since 2007, by finishing in fourth place at the Division 1 Playoff in Dallas with a 178-154 loss to Rat City Rollergirls of Seattle. Philly had a repeat result in 2016 with a second consecutive day 3 loss to Rat City at the Vancouver Division 1 tournament, 134-114, to again finish in fourth place and miss Championships. At the 2017 Division 1 tournament in Dallas, Philly won their opening game against Arizona Roller Derby 163-108. After losing their quarterfinal to Victorian Roller Derby League, Philly finished their weekend by winning their consolation round game against Santa Cruz Derby Girls 156-106.

In 2018, Philly qualified for WFTDA Playoffs as the eighth seed in A Coruña, Spain, and opened their weekend by defeating Stockholm Roller Derby by a score of 204-154. For the second year in a row, Philly ended their weekend in the consolation round against Santa Cruz, this time losing by a score of 186-139.

In 2019, Philly qualified for WFTDA Playoffs as the third seed in Seattle, and opened their weekend by defeating London Roller Derby by a score of 199-121. For the second game Philly took on second seed Montreal Roller Derby, losing 181-147. Philly defeated Crime City Rollers by a score of 156-104 to win the bronze medal, qualifying for WFTDA Championships for the first time since 2014. At the 2019 WFTDA International Championships in Montreal, Canada, Philly Liberty Belles opened their weekend by defeating eighth-seeded Texas Rollergirls by a score of 136-114. For the second game Philly took on top seed Rose City Rollers, losing 205-50. For the third game Philly took on sixth seed Montreal Roller Derby, losing 135-115.

The 2020 WFTDA season was cancelled due to COVID-19.

Following the cancellation of the 2020 WFTDA season due to the COVID-19 pandemic, competitive play remained limited throughout 2021 as leagues gradually returned to training and competition under revised health and safety guidelines. The Women's Flat Track Derby Association introduced updated return-to-play recommendations and delayed traditional rankings and playoff structures while member leagues rebuilt rosters and resumed sanctioned games.

In 2022, WFTDA launched the "Back on Track" event series to mark the return of international roller derby competition. Philly Roller Derby resumed competitive play during this period, participating in interleague bouts as leagues across North America gradually returned to sanctioned competition following pandemic-related disruptions.

By 2023, WFTDA implemented a revised competitive structure dividing leagues into regional groupings. Philly Roller Derby competed within the North America Northeast region as sanctioned competition resumed and rankings were reinstated. The league participated in sanctioned bouts as part of the rebuilding phase following the pandemic hiatus.

Philly Roller Derby continued competition through the 2024 season as WFTDA reinstated regional championships and global competition pathways. The return of postseason tournaments marked the first structured championship pathway since the cancellation of the 2020 season

=== Rankings ===
Season	Final ranking	Playoffs	Championship
2006	18 WFTDA	—	N/A
2007	10 WFTDA	R2 E	DNQ
2008	2 E	3 E	3
2009	2 E	1 E	QF
2010	2 E	2 E	4
2011	2 E	2 E	QF
2012	2 E	2 E	R1
2013	14 WFTDA	2 D1	R1 D1
2014	10 WFTDA	3 D1	R1 D1
2015	11 WFTDA	4 D1	DNQ
2016	17 WFTDA	4 D1	DNQ
2017	25 WFTDA	CR D1	DNQ
2018	23 WFTDA	CR	DNQ
2019	9 WFTDA	3	R2
2020	NO DERBY COVID-19		

- CR = consolation round

== Community involvement ==
Philly donated a portion of ticket proceeds from the East Coast Derby Extravaganza tournament to benefit the HERA Women's Cancer Foundation in both 2007 and 2008.

== Retired numbers ==
- Castro - 06
- The Cyclone - 63

Preceded by Gotham Girls Roller Derby	WFTDA Eastern Regional Tournament winners 2009	Succeeded by Gotham Girls Roller Derby
