= DC Roller Derby =

Roller derby league

- Metro area: Washington, D.C.
- Country: United States
- Founded: 2006
- Teams: DC All-Stars (A-Team); National Maulers (B-Team); Capitol Offenders (C-Team); Cherry Blossom Bombshells; DC DemonCats; Majority Whips; Scare Force One; Secretaries of Hate (2006–08)
- Track type(s): Flat
- Venue: D.C. Armory, Dulles SportsPlex
- Affiliations: WFTDA
- Org. type: 501(c)3
- Website: dcrollerderby.org

DC Roller Derby is a women's flat track roller derby league in Washington, D.C. DC Roller Derby is a member of the Women's Flat Track Derby Association (WFTDA).

== History ==
DC Roller Derby (founded as the DC Rollergirls) was founded in early 2006 by Ginger Park, Shannon Flowers and Katelyn Coram. After spending much of the first year recruiting and training, the league first held public games in 2007 at the Dulles SportsPlex. By 2010, attendance for home games at the DC Armory was averaging between 1300 and 1500 fans.

In 2011, DC Roller Derby co-hosted the WFTDA Eastern Regional Tournament along with the now-defunct Baltimore league Charm City Roller Derby.

Before DC Roller Derby, the area was home to the Washington, D.C. Jets, which played banked track roller derby until 1978.

DC Roller Derby plays most of their bouts at the DC Armory and Dulles SportsPlex.

== Teams ==
As of 2014, the league consists of four home teams: the Cherry Blossom Bombshells, DC DemonCats, Majority Whips and Scare Force One.

Upon creation in 2006, the league consisted of the Cherry Blossom Bombshells, DC DemonCats, Scare Force One, and the now-defunct Secretaries of Hate. The Majority Whips were formed in 2011.

=== Seasons ===
Season	Champion
1	Scare Force One
2	Scare Force One
3	DC DemonCats
4	DC DemonCats
5	Scare Force One
6	Scare Force One
7	Scare Force One
8	Scare Force One
9	DC DemonCats

== WFTDA competition ==
DC Roller Derby's All-Star team competes on an international level. As of June 2014, they occupied 42nd place in the WFTDA's rankings. In 2009, DC competed at the WFTDA Eastern Regional Tournament as the ninth seed and finished in eighth place. At the 2010 Eastern Regional, DC was the tenth seed but finished in ninth place after defeating Dutchland Rollers 206–118. DC returned for the final Eastern Regional in 2012 as the tenth seed, but improved to a sixth-place finish, ending with a 252–112 loss to Montreal Roller Derby.

In 2013, DC qualified for the newly created Division 2 Playoffs as the fourth seed in Des Moines, Iowa, but finished in ninth place, salvaging their weekend with a 345–135 victory over Tallahassee RollerGirls. DC was the second seed at the 2014 Division 2 Playoff in Kitchener-Waterloo, Ontario, but finished in sixth place.

When WFTDA reverted back to geographic regional divisions in 2023, DC Roller Derby was placed in the North American Northeast (NA Northeast) division.

=== Rankings ===
Season	Final ranking	Playoffs	Championship
2008	9 E	DNQ	DNQ
2009	9 E	8 E	DNQ
2010	9 E	9 E	DNQ
2011	11 E	DNQ	DNQ
2012	7 E	6 E	DNQ
2013	57 WFTDA	9 D2	DNQ
2014	51 WFTDA	6 D2	DNQ
2015	78 WFTDA	DNQ	DNQ
2016	77 WFTDA	DNQ	DNQ
2017	60 WFTDA	DNQ	DNQ
2018	85 WFTDA	DNQ	DNQ
2019	96 WFTDA	DNQ	DNQ
2023	72 NA Northeast	DNQ	DNQ
2024	69 NA Northeast	DNQ	DNQ
