= Boston Roller Derby =

Roller derby league

- Metro area: Boston, Massachusetts
- Country: United States
- Founded: 2005
- Teams: Boston Massacre (A team); Boston B Party (B team); Train Wrecks (interleague rec); Arkham Horrors; Cosmonaughties; Nutcrackers; Wicked Pissahs
- Track type: Flat
- Venue: Aleppo Shriners Auditorium, Simoni Ice Rink
- Affiliations: WFTDA
- Website: www.bostonrollerderby.com

Boston Roller Derby (BRD) is a flat-track roller derby league based in Boston, Massachusetts. The league was founded as Boston Derby Dames in May 2005, and is a founding member of the Women's Flat Track Derby Association (WFTDA). The league's all-star team, the Boston Massacre, was one of the top 25 WFTDA Division 1 teams in the world through most of the duration of the divisional ranking system introduced in early 2013, and as of December 31, 2015, the Massacre was ranked at 21. Boston won the WFTDA Division 2 Championship in 2017 and the North America East Continental Cup in 2018. Due to Covid-19 the league temporarily paused in 2020.

Boston Roller Derby is skater-owned and -operated, sporting more than 70 full-time skaters who both skate and work as part of their duties. BRD plays at Aleppo Shriners Auditorium in Wilmington for all home team games and Simoni Ice Rink in Cambridge for its all-star match-ups against rival teams from around the world.

In late October 2015, Boston Roller Derby announced its new name as part of a rebrand "to better reflect the diversity of our community."

== Early history ==
Original Boston Derby Dames logo

Boston Roller Derby was founded by Sarah Doom and Ivana Clobber in 2005 after Doom helped found Providence Roller Derby. The league was formally established as an LLC in the state of Massachusetts by the founding executive board members Andrea Lenco, Sarah Kingan, Alison McAlear, Carroll Cunningham, Eva McCloskey, Lindsay Crudele, and Rebecca Allen the same year. The league began with a travel team called The Boston Massacre (Boston's all-star travel team) and was followed by the addition of three home teams: the Cosmonaughties, Nutcrackers, and Wicked Pissahs. The Boston Massacre had its first game in December 2005, against the Sin City Rollergirls. The home teams began competing the following year (March 2006). In 2008 Boston added the Boston B Party, to allow home team skaters to play against neighboring leagues without having to be at the all-star level; in 2012, the B Party became the Massacre's official farm team.

Boston Roller Derby's Training and Recreation program was also founded in 2012. The program offers newer skaters a place to learn and grow on the league, and allows transfer skaters from other leagues to become acclimated to Boston's skating style and requirements before being placed on a home team.

== Teams ==
Boston Roller Derby is composed of four home teams, the Harbor Horrors, Cosmonaughties, Nutcrackers, and Wicked Pissahs; an all-star travel team, the Boston Massacre; an interleague B-team, the Boston B Party; and an interleague training team, the Common.

In addition, Boston offers a Training and Recreation program (TRT), for new and transferring skaters who wish to learn how to play roller derby. It is divided up into two levels—non-contact and contact—each named after a line of Boston's MBTA service. Once skaters graduate from the TRT program, they're eligible to be drafted to a home team and to skate with the Train Wrecks. The TRT program accepts new trainees and transfers on a three-month cycle; the application period is approximately one month before the cycle begins.

Boston also provides a training program for those looking to become roller derby officials.

== WFTDA competition ==
=== Early years ===
In 2005, The Boston Massacre had its first sanctioned WFTDA bout against the Sin City Rollergirls. In 2006, as a newly formed team, The Boston Massacre played just two sanctioned WFTDA bouts and competed in their first unsanctioned round-robin tournament (Bumberbout) in Seattle. They ended the season ranked #13 nationally by the WFTDA.

=== East Region era ===
In 2007, the Boston Massacre earned a berth at the first WFTDA Eastern Regional Tournament. The tournament was a single-elimination tournament and The Boston Massacre was defeated by the Detroit Derby Girls by 5 points in an overtime jam. The tournament had no final ranking structure. They ended the season ranked #14 Nationally by the WFTDA.

In 2008, the Boston Massacre earned their second trip to the Eastern Regional Tournament. The Boston Massacre finished the tournament winning three of their four bouts, losing the final Championship-qualifying bout by 2 points to the Carolina Rollergirls. The tournament had no final ranking structure. They ended the season ranked third in the East Region.

Boston Massacre began competing as a separate team at the start of 2009, rather than as collective members of players from each of the separate home teams. The Boston Massacre finished third in the 2009 Eastern Regional Tournament, qualifying them to compete in the 2009 WFTDA Championships, as of 2016 Boston's only Championships appearance. Boston defeated the Mad Rollin' Dolls (Madison) in their first-round bout, 104–98. In the second round, quarter finals, Boston was defeated by the Texas Rollergirls (Austin) 111–72, eliminating them from the tournament. Boston finished the season ranked third in the East and in the Top 12 of the WFTDA nationally.

In 2010, the team finished the season placing fourth at the Eastern Regional Tournament.

In 2011, The Boston Massacre and The Boston "B Party" began to train together. In 2012, the league officially combined the two teams to create the Boston Travel Teams and the "B Party" became the official farm team to the Boston Massacre. The team finished the season in seventh place at the Eastern Regional Tournament in both 2011 and 2012.

=== Divisional era ===
In 2013, WFTDA abolished the regional ranking system and switched to an international rankings system. Boston finished the tournament season placing seventh in their first Division 1 tournament. At the end of 2013, Boston was ranked 16th in the WFTDA.

In 2014, Boston again qualified for Division 1 Playoffs, entering the Charleston tournament as the sixth seed, and finishing in seventh place. In 2015, Boston returned to Division 1 Playoffs, this time as the sixth seed in Omaha, where they finished in fifth place. At 2016 Division 1 Playoff in Montreal, Boston finished in the position in which they started, as the sixth place team.

In 2017, Boston competed at Division 2 Playoffs for the first time, and was the seventh seed at the combined 2017 Division 2 Playoffs and Championships in Pittsburgh, winning the title with a 166–150 victory over Paris Rollergirls.

In 2018, Boston qualified for the WFTDA North American East Continental Cup held in Kalamazoo, Michigan as the first seed, and went unbeaten in capturing first place.

=== Rankings ===
Season	Final ranking	Playoffs	Championship
2006	13 WFTDA	—	N/A
2007	14 WFTDA	R1 E	DNQ
2008	3 E	QF E	DNQ
2009	3 E	3 E	R2
2010	4 E	4 E	DNQ
2011	7 E	7 E	DNQ
2012	7 E	7 E	DNQ
2013	16 WFTDA	7 D1	DNQ
2014	25 WFTDA	7 D1	DNQ
2015	21 WFTDA	5 D1	DNQ
2016	25 WFTDA	6 D1	DNQ
2017	30 WFTDA	N/A	1 D2
2018	34 WFTDA	1 CC NA East	NA

Preceded by Blue Ridge Rollergirls	WFTDA Division 2 Championship winners 2017	Succeeded by incumbent
Preceded by event created	WFTDA Continental Cup North America East winners 2018	Succeeded by incumbent
