= Gotham Roller Derby =

Roller derby league

- Metro area: New York City
- Country: United States
- Founded: 2003
- Teams: Gotham All-Stars (A team); Brooklyn Bombshells; Manhattan Mayhem; Queens of Pain; Bronx Gridlock; Wall Street Traitors (travel); Grand Central Terminators (travel); Diamond District (travel); Gotham Junior Derby (youth)
- Track type: Flat
- Venue: varies; most frequently at John Jay College of Criminal Justice
- Affiliations: WFTDA
- Org. type: 501(c)(3) NPO
- Website: gothamrollerderby.com

Gotham Roller Derby is a flat track roller derby league based in New York City, New York. Founded in late 2003, Gotham is the first flat track roller derby league in the metropolitan New York area and a founding member league of the sport's governing body, the Women's Flat Track Derby Association (WFTDA). Gotham is one of the preeminent leagues in roller derby, having won five WFTDA Championships. Today, the league is composed of four New York City-based teams, three travel teams, a competitive developmental team, a non competitive recreational program and a juniors program for youth.

== League structure ==
=== Home Teams ===
Gotham consists of four home teams that represent four of the city's boroughs that do not reflect the residences of the skaters. These team play interleague games against each other, culminating in the annual championship game. Each team is supported by a "Jeerleader" squad and consists of 16 skaters who were drafted from a pool.

- The Brooklyn Bombshells (founded 2004)
- The Manhattan Mayhem (founded 2004)
- The Queens of Pain (founded 2005)
- The Bronx Gridlock (founded 2006)

=== Travel Teams ===
The league consists of travel teams that play against other leagues.

- The Gotham All-Stars - The all star travel team competes against other leagues' A teams in the Women's Flat Track Derby Association. Members are selected via a tryout process, and many also play for home teams.
- The Wall Street Traitors - An "all-borough" travel team which competes as Gotham's B Team against other leagues, composed of skaters from the home teams. Like the All-Stars, the team is selected through a tryout process.
- The Grand Central Terminators - An additional travel team debuted in June 2012, for exhibition games with other leagues, composed of skaters from all four home teams and the Diamond District who are neither on the All-Stars nor on the Traitors.
- The Diamond District - A team comprising rookie skaters and veterans who are not members of the home teams. The District operates as both a developmental team, with skaters who may or may not enter the draft, and as a team with veteran skaters that plays other leagues.

=== Junior Derby ===
- Gotham Junior Derby - an educational program set up in 2012 to train junior roller derby skaters age 6-17. The juniors skaters compete against other leagues and play in exhibition bouts.

=== Tryouts ===
To join Gotham, skaters must complete tryouts that occur annually in October before they become the league's newest inducted skaters. Skaters tryout over a weekend then advance to tryout period lasting several weeks before they become official league members.

== League History ==
=== Early years ===
Former league logo

Karin "Chassis Crass" Bruce and David "Lefty" Leibowitz met through an online ad in 2003 and together formed the organization as Gotham Girls Roller Derby, initially recruiting skaters and holding "open skate" sessions. In 2004, Gotham hosted their first exhibition bout, the "Beat Down in the Boogie Down," at The Skate Key, where a crowd of 600 watched the Brooklyn Bombshells defeat the Manhattan Mayhem in overtime.

In 2005, Gotham launched its first full season at The Skate Key, with a roster of 20-25 skaters. After two games between Manhattan and Brooklyn, the league introduced the Queens of Pain, who became the first Gotham Season Champions.

In 2006, the league introduced its fourth home team, the Bronx Gridlock. In 2007, The Skate Key closed and the league secured a practice space called the Crash Pad. The league began holding season bouts at City College of New York and Hunter College. That same year, the Brooklyn Bombshells defeated the Long Island Roller Rebels All-Stars, and the Manhattan Mayhem defeated all-stars from the New Jersey Dirty Dames in a double-header. In 2008, Gotham added more interleague play and held eight bouts at Hunter College. The Wall Street Traitors played teams from Philly, Connecticut, and New England, while the Brooklyn Bombshells and Manhattan Mayhem won against Montreal and Providence, respectively.

=== Today ===
From 2010-2020, the league practiced out of a second Crash Pad location in Bushwick, and Gotham home teams played against each other at venues like John Jay College and Abe Stark Arena. The league consisted of roughly 150 skaters and officials. During the COVID-19 pandemic, the league lost its Crash Pad practice space in Bushwick, and as of February 2025, has not secured a new space due to high costs. They have been practicing and playing games out of LeFrak Center rink in Prospect Park. The space becomes an ice skating rink in the winter, which limits the roller derby practice season for the league.

In 2021, the league announced a rebrand and shortened its name to Gotham Roller Derby, "better reflect our community and the evolution of our sport". Gotham Roller Derby celebrated its 20 year anniversary in 2024.

== WFTDA Competition ==
The Gotham Girls All-Stars lost their first inter-league bout in September 2005, against the Dairyland Dolls of Mad Rollin' Dolls of Madison, Wisconsin, 82-72. In February 2006, the All-Stars competed at the first WFTDA-sanctioned roller derby tournament, the Dust Devil, in Tucson, Arizona where they finished in 10th place.

The All-Stars are five-time Women's Flat Track Derby Association champions, winning the Hydra trophy in 2008 and from 2011 through 2014. From the introduction of the WFTDA Division system in 2013 through March 2017, Gotham was continuously the top-ranked league in the organization until Victorian Roller Derby League took over top spot.

In 2018, Gotham received a bye directly to WFTDA Championships, by placing within the top four teams overall, as the third seed, in the June 30 rankings. At Championships in New Orleans, Gotham won the bronze medal with a 164-151 victory against Denver Roller Derby. In 2019 Gotham once again received a bye directly to the WFTDA Championships at which they won the silver medal.

The WFTDA rankings were suspended in April 2020 due to the COVID-19 pandemic before re-starting in February 2023 in a new format, in which Gotham ranked 3rd in the Northeast Region. Gotham lost in the semi-final round when WFDTA Championships re-started in 2024.

=== Rankings ===
Season	Final ranking	Playoffs	Championship
2006	12 WFTDA	—	10
2007	5 WFTDA	1 E	R1
2008	1 E	1 E	1
2009	1 E	2 E	QF
2010	1 E	1 E	3
2011	1 E	1 E	1
2012	1 E	1 E	1
2013	1 WFTDA	1 D1	1 D1
2014	1 WFTDA	1 D1	1 D1
2015	1 WFTDA	1 D1	2 D1
2016	1 WFTDA	1 D1	2 D1
2017	3 WFTDA	1 D1	3 D1
2018	3 WFTDA	bye	3
2019	3 WFTDA	bye	2
2020	3 WFTDA	N/A	N/A
2023	3 NE	N/A	N/A
2024	3 NE	3 NE	SF

- bye = received bye directly to WFTDA Championships

== In the Media ==
Gotham Roller Derby has been featured in major publications and outlets, including the New York Times, ESPN, the Wendy Williams Show, The Huffington Post, the Wall Street Journal and Refinery29.

In the 2010s, home bouts were telecast on NYC Life, the flagship station of NYC Media Group, the official TV, radio and online network of the City of New York.

In October 2011, Gotham skater Suzy Hotrod was featured photographed without clothing in ESPN Magazine's annual "The Body Issue," representing roller derby alongside athletes from many other mainstream American sports.

== League champions and major awards ==
League Champions are determined in an end-of-season playoff bout and additional award winners are determined by poll of league members. The C.A.N.T.S.L.E.E.P. award is the "Crass Award for Never-Tiring Support for the League with Endless Enthusiasm and Positivity," named for league founder Chassis Crass, and awarded to one league member each year.

The current champions of the 2019 Gotham Girls Roller Derby home team season are the Bronx Gridlock.

=== Retired Numbers ===
- 11 - Chassis Crass
- 340 - Bonnie Thunders
- 68 - Sexy Slaydie

In May 2009, the league retired the uniform number of league founder Chassis Crass. Her framed Brooklyn Bombshell retired uniform hangs at Manitoba's, 99 Avenue B in Manhattan. In December 2016 at Gotham's end-of-year awards night, Bonnie Thunders' jersey was retired by the league. In 2024, the league retired Sexy Slaydie's jersey after her death from colorectal cancer.

Preceded by Kansas City Roller Warriors	WFTDA Championship winners 2008	Succeeded by Oly Rollers
Preceded by Rocky Mountain Rollergirls	WFTDA Championship winners 2011–2014	Succeeded by Rose City Rollers
Preceded by New tournament	WFTDA Eastern Regional Tournament winners 2007 and 2008	Succeeded by Philly Rollergirls
Preceded by Philly Rollergirls	WFTDA Eastern Regional Tournament winners 2010–2012	Succeeded by Tournaments restructured
