= Montreal Roller Derby =

Roller derby league

- Metro area: Montreal, Quebec
- Country: Canada
- Founded: 2006
- Teams: New Skids on the Block (A team); Les Sexpos (B team); Les Contrabanditas; Les Filles du Roi; La Racaille; Smash Squad (rookie)
- Track type: Flat
- Venue: le TAZ; Arena St Louis
- Affiliations: WFTDA
- Website: mtlrollerderby.com

Montreal Roller Derby is a women's flat-track roller derby league in Montreal, Quebec, Canada. Montreal Roller Derby became the first non-U.S. Women's Flat Track Derby Association (WFTDA) member league in January 2009. In 2019, Montreal Roller Derby hosted the International WFTDA Championships, marking the first time the event was held outside the United States.

== History and organization ==
A non-profit organization, Montreal Roller Derby was founded as the first flat-track roller derby league in Montreal in 2006 by Georgia W. Tush; in 2018, the league first held a tournament named after her, after she had retired from skating.

The league has a three-team house league, formerly Les Contrabanditas, Les Filles du Roi, and La Racaille, plus two travel teams. Formed in March 2007, La Racaille is identified by green and silver uniforms. The name translates in English to "riff raff", and is often used as a derogatory term in France to refer to delinquents and people living on the fringes of society. La Racaille won the 2008 championship and their captain, Iron Wench, was named MVP for the 2008 season. Colloquially known as "FDR", Les Filles du Roi is identified by purple and gold uniforms. The team formed in 2006 and won the championship in 2007. The name, which translates in English to " the King's Daughters", refers to the women that were shipped to New France under the auspices of the French monarchy in the mid-seventeenth century. Colloquially known as "The Ditas", Les Contrabanditas is identified by red and black uniforms. The Ditas were the first team formed under the Montreal Roller Derby League.

Montreal's top level travel teams are The New Skids on the Block and Les Sexpos. These teams are made up of members from all three league teams. In September 2010, The New Skids became the first non-US team to play in the WFTDA playoffs, but were eliminated from qualifying for the 2010 finals by The Boston Massacre of Boston Derby Dames. Les Sexpos, as the B team, have also had an impressive record, and when they were beaten by Toronto Roller Derby's CN Power in September 2011, that marked only the first time they had been beaten by a Canadian squad.

== WFTDA competition ==
In 2011, the New Skids took part in the first WFTDA regional tournament bout to feature two non-American teams, losing the fifth place bout at the WFTDA Eastern Regional Tournament in Baltimore, Maryland to the London Rollergirls London Brawling squad, 137 to 135. In August 2012, The New Skids were ranked third in the WFTDA East Region.

In September 2016, Montreal Roller Derby hosted a 2016 International Division 1 Playoff at Centre Pierre Charbonneau, at which their New Skids on the Block finished in third place and became the first Canadian team to qualify for Division 1 WFTDA Championships. At Championships, Montreal lost their opening-round game against Angel City Derby Girls 217-116, and were eliminated. In 2017, Montreal again finished in third at their Division 1 Playoff, this time by defeating Rat City Rollergirls 257-126 in Seattle. At Championships, Montreal won their first game, 133-129 over Crime City Rollers, but then lost to Victorian Roller Derby League in the quarterfinals and to London in the consolation bracket and finished out of the medals.

At the 2018 Playoffs in Atlanta, Montreal was the second seed and finished in third place with a 180-175 victory over London. At Championships in New Orleans, Montreal again faced Crime City in the opening game of the weekend, and again defeated them by 4 points, this time 184-180. After losing their quarterfinal to eventual champions Rose City Rollers, Montreal lost their consolation game to Angel City, 199-118.

=== Rankings ===
Season	Final ranking	Playoffs	Championship
2008	NR E	DNQ	DNQ
2009	13 E	DNQ	DNQ
2010	7 E	7 E	DNQ
2011	6 E	6 E	DNQ
2012	5 E	5 E	DNQ
2013	15 WFTDA	4 D1	DNQ
2014	17 WFTDA	5 D1	DNQ
2015	15 WFTDA	4 D1	DNQ
2016	19 WFTDA	3 D1	R1 D1
2017	8 WFTDA	3 D1	CR D1
2018	8 WFTDA	3	CR

- CR = consolation round

== International play ==
In August 2011, six members of Montreal Roller Derby were chosen to play for Team Canada at the inaugural Roller Derby World Cup, held in December 2011 in Toronto, Ontario.

== Beast of the East ==
Every spring, Montreal roller derby hosts an invitational tournament at Arena St Louis known as The Beast of the East. Sixteen teams play a tournament of abbreviated bouts over the course of the weekend. The tournament is open to home teams only – not travel, or "all-star" teams – and is typically the last weekend in April. The 2012 edition played April 20 and 21.
