= WFTDA Eastern Regional Tournament =

WFTDA Eastern Region Playoff
- 2007–2012

Tournament information
- Location: Various
- Month played: September
- Established: 2007
- Format: Knockout

Current champion
- Gotham Girls Roller Derby

The WFTDA East Region Playoffs or WFTDA Eastern Regional Tournament was one of four annual roller derby regional qualifying tournaments for the WFTDA Championships.

The Tournament was organised by the Women's Flat Track Derby Association (WFTDA). Full WFTDA members in the Eastern Region members were eligible for ranking, and the top ten leagues would qualify for the Eastern Regional Tournament, and the top three finalists would qualify for the Championships. Together, the four qualifying tournaments and Championships were termed the "Big 5". Starting with the 2013 WFTDA season, WFTDA's regions were discontinued in favor of an overall-rankings based system, and a new playoff format was created.

== Championships ==
Year	Date	Name	Venue	Champion	Second	Third
2007	17-19 August	Heartland Havoc	Columbus, Ohio	Gotham Girls Roller Derby	Windy City Rollers	Carolina Rollergirls
2008	8-10 October	Derby in Dairyland	Madison, Wisconsin	Gotham Girls Roller Derby	Windy City Rollers	Philly Rollergirls
2009	11-13 September	Wicked Wheels of the East	Raleigh, North Carolina	Philly Rollergirls	Gotham Girls Roller Derby	Boston Derby Dames
2010	24-26 September	Derby in the Burbs	White Plains, New York	Gotham Girls Roller Derby	Philly Rollergirls	Charm City Roller Girls
2011	16-18 September	Nightmare on 95	Baltimore, Maryland	Gotham Girls Roller Derby	Philly Rollergirls	Charm City Roller Girls
2012	28-30 September	Sugarbush Showdown	Burlington, Vermont	Gotham Girls Roller Derby	Philly Rollergirls	Charm City Roller Girls

=== 2007 Heartland Havoc ===
The 2007 Eastern Regional Tournament was held August 17 - 19 in Columbus, Ohio. It was a 12-team single-elimination tournament with the same structure as February's Dust Devil Western Regional. There were numerous upsets on the second day: Chicago's Windy City Rollers, ranked #14 in the nation at the time, defeated the Mad Rollin' Dolls of Madison, Wisconsin, ranked #1 at the time. Additionally, the #19 Detroit Derby Girls defeated the #6 Minnesota Rollergirls, and the #10 Gotham Girls Roller Derby defeated #9 Philly. In the championship bout, Gotham beat Windy City, 134–71.

=== 2008 Derby In Dairyland ===
On October 10, 2008, the Gotham Girls Roller Derby (GGRD All-Stars) beat the Windy City Rollers 133-92 in the championship bout. Philly Rollergirls' Liberty Belles beat the Carolina Rollergirls 112-48 in the consolation bout to take third place.

=== 2009 Wicked Wheels of the East ===
On September 13, 2009, the Philly Rollergirls' Liberty Belles beat Gotham Girls Roller Derby 90-89 in the East championship bout. The Boston Derby Dames' Boston Massacre defeated the Charm City Rollergirls 156-142 to take 3rd place.

=== 2010 Derby In the Burbs ===
The 2010 tournament was held in White Plains, NY, and featured the first appearance by a non-American team at a WFTDA regional tournament, in 6th-ranked Montreal Roller Derby's New Skids on the Block, who wound up finishing in 7th place. Gotham won the tournament for the third time in four years, defeating Philly 133 - 103 on day three, while 4th-ranked Charm City beat Boston 162 - 128 to take third place.
