= Women's Flat Track Derby Association =

International governing body for the sport of women's flat track roller derby

Women's Flat Track Derby Association (WFTDA)
- Women's Flat Track Derby Association logo
- Sport: Roller derby
- Founded: 2006; 20 years ago
- President: Bri DeWitt (Babe Runner)
- Motto: "More than just a sport"
- No. of teams: 410 Full Member leagues; (as of 12 October 2026)
- Countries: Argentina; Austria; Australia; Belgium; Brazil; Canada; Chile; Colombia; Czech Republic; Denmark; Finland; France; Germany; Iceland; Ireland; Italy; Japan; Mexico; Malta; Netherlands; New Zealand; Norway; Peru; Poland; Portugal; South Africa; Spain; Sweden; Switzerland; United Kingdom; United States; Uruguay
- Headquarters: Austin, Texas, U.S.
- Most recent champion: Victorian Roller Derby League
- Most titles: Gotham Girls Roller Derby (5)
- Streaming partners: Sporfie.com & YouTube.com
- Website: WFTDA.com

The Women's Flat Track Derby Association (WFTDA) is the international governing body for the sport of women's flat track roller derby. It sets the international standards for rankings, rules, and competition in the sport, and provides guidance and resources to aid the development of roller derby.

The organization was founded in April 2004 as the United Leagues Coalition (ULC), but was renamed in November 2005. It is registered in Raleigh, North Carolina as a 501(c)(3) Business League organization, a type of nonprofit organization.

== History ==
In 2004, the United Leagues Coalition (ULC) was an informal electronic message board through which established leagues compared notes in order to prepare for interleague play, and exchanged information to help developing leagues.

The ULC evolved into a more formal organization in July 2005, when representatives of 20 leagues met in Chicago, Illinois to discuss establishing a governing body for women's flat-track roller derby. At the meeting, a voting system and set of goals were established, and a timeline delineated for facilitating interleague play. Among the actions from this meeting was the production of a standard track design, and an agreed ruleset. In early 2006, a track design and rules were published on the organization's fledgling website.

In November 2005, the ULC voted to change its name to the Women's Flat Track Derby Association (WFTDA), with an initial membership of 22 leagues.

By early 2006, the organization had grown to 30 leagues, a cap decided upon at the July 2005 meeting. In February that year, soon after the initial membership requirements were published (and following the fragmentation of several leagues), a "multi-league per city" clause was added. Throughout the first half of the year the clause was listed as a requirement for membership, however a statement was issued in June 2006 labelling the policy as "unofficial". The WFTDA intimated that the policy was in place due to concerns about the impact on goodwill between member leagues of competition for support in the same city, and that having multiple leagues in the same city could undermine the organization's goals of fostering the development of the sport by sharing proprietary information by potentially limiting the sharing of competitive information. Around this time, induction of new member leagues was put on hold until processes could be discussed at the second annual meeting, held in Saint Paul, Minnesota in July 2006. At this meeting the membership application process, membership requirements and policies, rules, rankings and plans for tournaments were finalized. The WFTDA opened its doors to new members in September 2006, again capped at 30. This limit was reached by September 2008.

From its inception, membership of the WFTDA was only open to the US, but was opened up to leagues from Canada in February 2008. In January 2009 Montreal Roller Derby became the WFTDA's 66th member league and the first Canadian league admitted as a member and was placed in the East region. That same month, the WFTDA announced it would stop accepting applications for new membership from February until July, so that it could concentrate on internal restructuring in order to, among other things, "grow the scope" of the organization.

In May 2009, the first sanctioned international WFTDA game was played between Montreal Roller Derby and Harrisburg Area Roller Derby at the Olympic Skating Center in Enola, Pennsylvania. Shortly thereafter, in November 2009, the WFTDA opened for worldwide membership and the London Rollergirls became the first league outside North America to join as Apprentice members.

In March 2012, Bear City Roller Derby from Berlin, Germany became the WFTDA's first full member league in continental Europe. In June 2013 the Rock n Roller Queens of Bogotá, Colombia became the first full member South American league. The Tokyo Roller Girls and Kokeshi Roller Dolls became the first full member leagues in Asia.

== Mission statement ==
The WFTDA governs and promotes the sport of flat track roller derby and revolutionizes the role of women in sports through the collective voice of its member leagues around the world.

=== Statement about gender ===
In November 2015, WFTDA issued a statement broadening its discrimination protections for gender identity to include transgender women, intersex women, and gender-expansive participants. In February 2025, the statement was updated to include any individual of a marginalized gender, including transgender men and non-binary participants.

=== Anti-racism ===
A statement was issued by the Board of Directors on 17 June 2020, committing the WFTDA to becoming an actively anti-racist organization, and setting the same expectation of all its partners and member leagues. This is an ongoing work plan under the auspices of the newly developed Anti-Racism Team (ART).

== Organization ==
The WFTDA in its current incarnation began as a group of 22 leagues in November 2005, born out of the United Leagues Coalition (ULC). Membership expanded to 30 leagues by early 2006, and was held at this number by a temporary pause on new memberships until September 2006. A vote in a meeting that July opened membership to a maximum of sixty leagues; by late August 2007 WFTDA membership was up to 43 leagues, and reached the target of 60 by September 2008.

In July 2017, the WFTDA surpassed over 400 member leagues and as of March 2023, there were 443 member leagues on six continents.

=== New Member Program ===
Prospective WFTDA member leagues can apply to join the organization as long as they meet the following requirements:

- Managed by at least 67% league skaters who identify as women or gender expansive, as detailed in the WFTDA Gender Statement.
- 51% owned by league skaters who identify as women or gender expansive, as detailed in the WFTDA Gender Statement.
- Governed by democratic principles and practices.
- Competitors must play by the Rules of Flat Track Roller Derby.
- At least fifteen skaters who are skating at least two hours a week.
- Each member league must have one charter team.
- This charter team must include only skaters who identify as women or gender expansive, as detailed in the WFTDA Gender Statement.

Applications are reviewed twice yearly, in March and September.

==== WFTDA Apprentice Program ====
The Women's Flat Track Derby Association Apprentice program was opened to aspiring member leagues in July 2009, replacing its traditional membership application process. Apprentice leagues were matched with an established WFTDA mentor league, to guide the apprentice through the processes and requirements necessary to become a full member. The intention was that upon completion of the program, apprentice leagues should have had the knowledge and recommendations needed to apply for full WFTDA membership.

In June 2010, the WFTDA announced the first round of Apprentice league graduates: Demolition City Roller Derby, Garden State Rollergirls, ICT Roller Girls, London Rollergirls, New Hampshire Roller Derby, Paper Valley Roller Girls, Rockford Rage Women's Roller Derby, Rollergirls of Southern Indiana, Silicon Valley Rollergirls, The Chicago Outfit and Wasatch Roller Derby.

In February 2019, the WFTDA announced it was replacing the Apprentice Program with a new New Member Program.

=== Management structure ===
Leadership of the organization is via an annually elected voluntary Board of Directors, consisting of a President, Vice-President, Secretary, Treasurer and four General Board Members.

The Board appoints an Officer for each of the six Pillars: Games, Membership, Marketing, Regulatory, Technology, and Officiating. These Pillars are represented by Committees made up of WFTDA League Representatives.

WFTDA employs several staff members in the organization, as well as in its for-profit subsidiary, WFTDA Insurance (WFTDI) and its broadcast company Quad Media.

=== Media ===
On 15 August 2007, the WFTDA announced it had struck a deal with the MAVTV network to record, edit and broadcast the 2007 Eastern Regional Tournament as a weekly series of 12 one-hour episodes (one episode per bout). In December 2019, an announcement was made that the WFTDA had established Quad Media, Inc. to further their goals to promote the sport of roller derby, reducing barriers to watching games and achieving excellence in the way the sport is presented. The partnership ended in December of 2019.

The official WFTDA magazine fiveonfive began publication in September 2008. The magazine ended physical publication in the summer of 2019. Following the COVID-19 pandemic, in March of 2022, the publisher announced that they were moving towards a free, open access repository blog to share historical articles and community stories.

As of 2019, the WFTDA manages their own broadcasts in-house and broadcasts through their streaming partner, Sporfie.

=== Affiliations ===
In September 2007, the WFTDA was admitted to USA Roller Sports (USARS) as a Class V member — a national amateur roller skating organization — and a WFTDA delegate joined the USARS Board of Directors. USARS has since developed its own separate set of rules, though WFTDA leagues can play against USARS leagues and there is an insurance reciprocity agreement between the organizations.

=== Impact of the COVID-19 pandemic ===
During the COVID-19 pandemic the WFTDA, in consultation with epidemiologists, formed a tiered activity "ladder" in order to keep the league operating during the crisis. The plan was hailed as "the best COVID-19 plan in sports".

Restrictions on gameplay and cancellation of the annual season placed significant financial pressure on member leagues, so in July 2021 the WFTDA COVID-19 Recovery Fund was announced. This fund provides microgrants to leagues or other roller derby organizations to aid recovery from the pandemic's impact.

== Rankings ==
Teams are ranked by region. Rankings are ordered by the relative strength of each team. The ratio between the ranking points of two teams indicates the predicted score ratio of a game played by those two teams.

Rankings are calculated by taking into account all games that have been played in a season by all teams at once. It uses a statistical method called “linear regression” to find the rankings for each team that best explain game results.

Rankings are regional - the calculations are done separately for each region.

- Only games between teams in the same region count for regional rankings. ○
- All games count for the Geographically Unrestricted Region (GUR).
- Ranking points and rankings should not be compared from one region to another.
- Regional rankings are seasonal - only games played within a rankings season count towards a team’s ranking for that season.
- A new rankings season starts on July 1st of every even-numbered year (2024, 2026, …). ○
- Ranking seasons do not overlap.
- Rankings are anchored in the previous season. A team’s final ranking from the previous season is used as a seed for the next season. It will affect their ranking until they have played 5 close games.
- GUR rankings are calculated from all games played within the prior two years (a rolling window).
- WFTDA publishes official rankings at the first of each month based on games played until the end of the previous month.
- The rankings published on the first day of a new season are considered end-of-season rankings for the previous season.
- Additional rankings, including live rankings, may be published.

=== Post-season tournaments ===
==== International WFTDA Playoffs and Championships ====
The Women’s Flat Track Derby Association (WFTDA) competitive system and rankings are regionally based. Every two years, each region hosts a Playoff of the size and structure that best supports the needs of the region, and the WFTDA will designate a number of seats per Region to seed teams to compete for the Hydra in the WFTDA Championship.

In order to promote more roller derby for more members, the WFTDA Charter Roster Policy allows leagues to enter more than one charter team into the competitive season, and skaters may play on a maximum of two charter teams. A skater’s two charter teams can be based in the same league or two different leagues. Two WFTDA teams of any league can have a maximum crossover of five skaters in the regular season and three skaters in the postseason events. Leagues with more than one team competing may not sanction games between their own teams.

The competitive season has been extended from the single year that was the prior standard, allowing teams more time to schedule and play the games they wish to play, and to give teams at the top of the regional rankings more time to plan and fundraise for Championships.

The Hydra Trophy is awarded annually to the top ranked team determined by the International WFTDA Championships tournament.

The 2020 Intentional Playoffs and Championships were cancelled due to the COVID-19 pandemic.

==== Continental Cups ====
Charter teams ranked below the cutoff for playoffs are seeded into geographically-based Continental Cups, replacing the former Division 2 system, which in 2017 saw the next 16 eligible teams compete in a single Playoff Tournament, with the winner crowned Division 2 champion. In 2018, there were two Continental Cups in North America, separated as West and East and featuring a combined total of 24 teams, and one Continental Cup in Europe featuring an additional eight teams. The 2018 announcement described the model for Continental Cups as "scalable", such that event numbers and sizes may change over time based on needs.

Teams in the WFTDA are assigned a region: North America-East, North America-West, Europe, Central/South America, Asia Pacific, and Africa. Regions without a Cup are assigned to the closest region: Asia Pacific to the North America–West Cup, South America to the North America–East Cup, and Western Australia and Africa to the European Cup.

The 2020 Continental Cups were cancelled due to the COVID-19 pandemic and have not since returned.

==== WFTDA league divisions ====
At the start of 2013, the geographic regions were replaced with three divisions, each operating worldwide. However, foreseeing continued growth in membership, the WFTDA stated that future developments were likely to include new regional structures alongside the divisional system. The Division structure has now been replaced by an updated version of the geographic regional divisions since 2024.

In 2013 WFTDA changed ranking systems from a regional, poll-based format released quarterly to a system based on the competitive ranking of teams using game results. When the organization did so, WFTDA introduced competitive divisions and expanded the playoff tournament structure. After the November 30 rankings release of each year, each league was placed within a competitive division for the next 12 months based on their charter team's rank. The leagues remained in their division for 12 months, no matter what their rank was in subsequent rankings releases.

Through 2016, the top 40 leagues from the November 30 rankings were placed in Division 1, the leagues ranked 41-100 (from 2015, those ranked 41-60) were put in Division 2, and through 2014 all other member leagues were grouped in Division 3.

A league's division placement determined the game play minimums for their WFTDA charter team in the following year. A Division 1 team needed to play no less than four WFTDA Sanctioned games, with at least three of those games against other Division 1 opponents and the fourth against either a Division 1 or Division 2 opponent, before June 30 of the following year. A Division 2 team needed to play a minimum of three WFTDA Sanctioned bouts, two against Division 1 or 2 opponents and the third against an opponent in any division. A Division 3 team needed to play a minimum of two WFTDA Sanctioned games against any opponents in order to maintain rankings. Division placement did not affect which playoffs a team qualified for, only minimum game play requirements. If a Division 2 or 3 team moved up the rankings into the top 40 at the time of tournament seeding that team would be invited to Division 1 Playoffs. Similarly, a Division 1 team moving down the rankings would receive an invitation befitting the team's rank at the time of seeding.

In 2017, the WFTDA adjusted the Division system and reduced the number of Playoff tournaments. The top 36 eligible teams qualified for one of three Division 1 Playoff tournaments, with 12 teams at each, and the top four at each event advanced to WFTDA Championships. The next 16 teams (ostensibly teams ranked 37 through 52, if all met eligibility requirements and accepted their invitation) competed at a single Division 2 Playoff, which included the Division 2 championship. In 2018 the Division 1 designation was effectively set aside, and play reduced to two tournaments and teams ranked fifth through 28th, with the top four advancing directly to Championships, and another 32 teams play for Continental Cups in North America and Europe, replacing the Division 2 structure.

==== WFTDA Geographic League Divisions ====
The earliest competition structure was geographical with Eastern and Western Regions delineated by the Mississippi River announced in July 2006.

In November 2008, it was announced that for the 2009 season, WFTDA member leagues would be divided into four regions, rather than two: West, South Central, North Central, and East. Each region had a tournament scheduled, followed by a national championship.

As of 2024, WFTDA has returned to operating under six geographic league divisions. The divisions are Europe (EUR), Latin America (LATAM), North America Northeast (NAE), North America South (NAS), North America West (NAW), and Oceania (OC).

In addition to the global regional divisions, they added a Geographically Unrestricted Region (GUR) for teams wishing to play teams outside of their regional division. Until a team has played a team in another regional division, it will not have a GUR ranking.

== Roller Derby Certification Program for Officials ==
A referee certification program was initiated in July 2008.

Officials can work towards Skating (referee) and Non-Skating Official (NSO) certification at the same time. Training resources are provided by the WFTDA. The process involves registering as an Official with the WFTDA, completing online learning and tests, officiating an appropriate number and level of games for the level of certification, and gaining documentation of your officiating from other certified Officials.

The program has three certification levels, corresponding to proven performance in officiating at different levels of gameplay:

- Recognized. Officials cannot currently apply for Recognized status, but may gain Recognition through application for Certification.
- Level 1 – Other/Regulation Play.
- Level 2 – Regulation/Sanctioned Play.
- Level 3 – Sanctioned/Playoffs/Championships Play.

== Rules of Flat Track Roller Derby ==
The Rules of Flat Track Roller Derby is the ruleset developed and published by the WFTDA, discussed and agreed by the WFTDA Rules Committee which features both WFTDA and Junior Roller Derby Association (JRDA) members. Updates are published each January.

The WFTDA ruleset is used by all WFTDA leagues, as well as MRDA and JRDA leagues. MRDA and WFTDA have worked together on developing the rules since 2014, and since 2017 have worked on a modified version of the rules for junior leagues. JRDA leagues use the WFTDA ruleset with addenda and a full set of updated JRDA rules is now published annually.

The first agreed ruleset and track design was developed in 2005 by member representatives of 20 leagues of the WFTDA-predecessor, the United Leagues Coalition (ULC), and published in 2005. In June 2008, the WFTDA Rules Committee created a Question and Answer forum to "provide definitive and final answers about the Women's Flat Track Derby Association Standard Rules. Version Two of the WFTDA Flat Track Derby Standardized Rules for Interleague Play was announced as forthcoming in mid-2006. The WFTDA Rules 4.0 were published in April 2009, with this revised ruleset becoming effective for all WFTDA sanctioned bouts on 1 June 2009.

As of 2020, the Rules are published in five languages: German, English, French, Spanish, and Chinese.
