= List of professional sports teams in Michigan =

Michigan has a number of professional and semi-professional sports teams in various sports and leagues.

== Major league teams ==
Team	Sport	League	Venue
Detroit Tigers	Baseball	Major League Baseball	Comerica Park
Detroit Lions	Football	National Football League	Ford Field
Detroit Red Wings	Ice hockey	National Hockey League	Little Caesars Arena
Detroit Pistons	Basketball	National Basketball Association	Little Caesars Arena

Michigan is home to four major-league professional sports teams, all of which play in Detroit. The Pistons played at Detroit's Cobo Arena until 1978 and at the Pontiac Silverdome until 1988, when they moved into the Palace of Auburn Hills where they played for 28 years between 1988 and 2017, before moving back inside city limits to Little Caesars Arena in Detroit in 2017. The Detroit Lions played at Tiger Stadium in Detroit until 1974, then moved to the Pontiac Silverdome where they played for 27 years between 1975 and 2002, before moving to Ford Field in Detroit in 2002. The Detroit Tigers played at Tiger Stadium (formerly known as Navin Field and Briggs Stadium) from 1912 to 1999. In 2000 they moved to Comerica Park. The Red Wings played at Olympia Stadium until 1979, Joe Louis Arena from 1979 to 2017, and then to Little Caesars Arena beginning in 2017.

== Other notable sports teams ==
Club	Sport	League	Metro Area (City)
Battle Creek Battle Jacks	Baseball	Summer Collegiate Baseball, Northwoods League	Battle Creek
Kalamazoo Growlers	Baseball	Summer Collegiate Baseball, Northwoods League	Kalamazoo
Saginaw Sugar Beets	Baseball	Summer Collegiate Baseball, Great Lakes Summer Collegiate League	Saginaw
Utica Unicorns	Baseball	United Shore Professional Baseball League	Utica
Eastside Diamond Hoppers	Baseball	United Shore Professional Baseball League	Detroit
Birmingham Bloomfield Beavers	Baseball	United Shore Professional Baseball League	Detroit
Westside Woolly Mammoths	Baseball	United Shore Professional Baseball League	Detroit
Lansing Lugnuts	Baseball	Minor League Baseball, Midwest League	Lansing
Great Lakes Loons	Baseball	Minor League Baseball, Midwest League	Midland
Traverse City Pit Spitters	Baseball	Northwoods League	Traverse City
West Michigan Whitecaps	Baseball	Minor League Baseball, Midwest League	Grand Rapids
Grand Rapids Gold	Basketball	NBA G League	Grand Rapids
Motor City Cruise	Basketball	NBA G League	Detroit
Detroit Coast II Coast All-Stars	Basketball	American Basketball Association	Detroit
Flint-Vehicle City Chargers	Basketball	American Basketball Association	Flint
Grand Rapids Danger	Basketball	American Basketball Association	Grand Rapids
Lansing Sting	Basketball	American Basketball Association	Lansing
Motor City Firebirds	Basketball	American Basketball Association	Detroit
Oakland County Cowboys	Basketball	American Basketball Association	Detroit
Team NetWork	Basketball	American Basketball Association	Detroit
West Michigan Lake Hawks	Basketball	American Basketball Association	Muskegon
Grand Rapids Fusion	Basketball	Independent Basketball Association	Grand Rapids
Lansing Capitals	Basketball	Independent Basketball Association	Lansing
Grand Rapids Cyclones	Basketball	Premier Basketball League	Grand Rapids
Lake Michigan Admirals	Basketball	Premier Basketball League	Benton Harbor
Michigan Panthers	Football	United States Football League (2022)	TBD
Grand Rapids Griffins	Ice hockey	American Hockey League	Grand Rapids
Kalamazoo Wings	Ice hockey	ECHL	Kalamazoo
Motor City Rockers	Ice hockey	Federal Prospects Hockey League	Fraser
Port Huron Prowlers	Ice hockey	Federal Prospects Hockey League	Port Huron
West Michigan Ironmen	Indoor football	American Arena League	Muskegon
Waza Flo	Indoor soccer	Major Arena Soccer League	Flint
Waza Premier	Indoor soccer	Premier Arena Soccer League	Flint
AFC Ann Arbor	Soccer	National Premier Soccer League	Ann Arbor
Detroit City FC	Soccer	USL Championship	Detroit (stadium in Hamtramck)
Grand Rapids FC	Soccer	National Premier Soccer League, United Women's Soccer	Grand Rapids
Kalamazoo FC	Soccer	National Premier Soccer League	Kalamazoo
Lansing United	Soccer	United Women's Soccer	Lansing
Michigan Stars FC	Soccer	National Premier Soccer League	Detroit
Flint City Bucks	Soccer	USL League Two	Flint
Ole SC	Soccer	Premier League of America	Grand Rapids
Carpathia FC	Soccer	United Premier Soccer League	Detroit
Muskegon Risers SC	Soccer	United Premier Soccer League	Muskegon
Oakland County FC	Soccer	United Premier Soccer League	Detroit
PASS FC	Soccer	United Premier Soccer League	Grand Rapids
Detroit Mechanix	Ultimate	American Ultimate Disc League	Grand Rapids (formerly in Detroit, currently keeping Detroit name)
Ann Arbor Derby Dimes	Roller derby	Women's Flat Track Derby Association	(Ann Arbor)
Detroit Roller Derby	Roller derby	Women's Flat Track Derby Association	Detroit
Flint City Derby Girls	Roller derby	Women's Flat Track Derby Association	Flint
Grand Raggidy Roller Derby	Roller derby	Women's Flat Track Derby Association	Grand Rapids
Killamazoo Derby Darlins	Roller derby	Women's Flat Track Derby Association	Kalamazoo
Lansing Derby Vixens	Roller derby	Women's Flat Track Derby Association	Lansing
Detroit Bordercats	Roller hockey	National Roller Hockey League	Detroit
Detroit Stars	Roller hockey	National Roller Hockey League	Dearborn Heights
Motor City Revive	Roller hockey	National Roller Hockey League	West Bloomfield
Shelby Surge	Roller hockey	National Roller Hockey League	Shelby Charter Township
Detroit Dark Angels	Women's football	Women's Football Alliance	Detroit
West Michigan Mayhem	Women's football	Women's Football Alliance	Kalamazoo
Grand Rapids Rise	Women's volleyball	Pro Volleyball Federation	Grand Rapids

== Former professional teams ==
Club	Sport	League(s)	Status
Detroit Drive	Arena football	Arena Football League	Became the Massachusetts Marauders for the 1994 season, then was suspended for three years.
Detroit Fury	Arena football	Arena Football League	Franchise terminated September 20, 2004
Grand Rapids Rampage	Arena football	Arena Football League	Franchise terminated March 5, 2010.
Detroit Stars	Baseball	Negro National League, 2nd Negro National League, Negro American League	The team ceased operations in 1960
Detroit Wolverines	Baseball	National League	Played 1881–1888. Disbanded following the 1888 season; NL champions and "World Series" champions, 1887
Kalamazoo Kings	Baseball	Minor League Baseball, Frontier League	Ceased operations in the 2011 season
Oakland County Cruisers	Baseball	Minor League Baseball, Frontier League	Moved to London, Ontario in 2012 and became the London Rippers (now defunct)
Detroit Shock	Basketball	Women's National Basketball Association	Moved to Tulsa, Oklahoma and became the Tulsa Shock; would move again to the Dallas–Fort Worth metroplex and are now the Dallas Wings.
Detroit Gems	Basketball	National Basketball League	Moved to Minneapolis and became the Minneapolis Lakers; would move again to Los Angeles and are now the Los Angeles Lakers
Detroit Falcons	Basketball	Basketball Association of America	Defunct
Michigan Mayhem	Basketball	Continental Basketball Association	Disbanded after 2005-2006 season
Holland Dream	Basketball	Independent Basketball Association	
Battle Creek Flight	Basketball	Independent Basketball Association	
Battle Creek Knights	Basketball	Premier Basketball League	
Detroit Panthers	Basketball	Premier Basketball League	
Mid-Michigan Destroyers	Basketball	Premier Basketball League	
Detroit Heralds/Tigers/Panthers/Wolverines	Football	National Football League	Defunct
Detroit Demolition	Football	Independent Women's Football League	
Detroit Wheels	Football	World Football League	Moved to Charlotte, North Carolina for one game, then disbanded in the middle of the 1974 season
Michigan Panthers	Football	United States Football League	Defunct
Flint Generals	Ice hockey	International Hockey League	Disbanded in 2010 when IHL merged into the AHL.
Michigan Stags	Ice hockey	World Hockey Association	Moved to Baltimore and became the Baltimore Blades for the rest of the team's existence
Detroit Vipers	Ice hockey	International Hockey League	Disbanded when IHL folded
Port Huron IceHawks	Ice hockey	International Hockey League	
St. Clair Shores Fighting Saints	Ice hockey	Federal Hockey League	Relocated to Kingsville, Ontario
Saginaw Sting	Indoor football	American Indoor Football	
Battle Creek Crunch	Indoor football	Continental Indoor Football League	
Detroit Thunder	Indoor football	Continental Indoor Football League	
Flint Phantoms	Indoor football	Continental Indoor Football League	
Kalamazoo Xplosion	Indoor football	Continental Indoor Football League	
Motor City Reapers	Indoor football	Continental Indoor Football League	
Muskegon Thunder	Indoor football	Continental Indoor Football League	
Port Huron Patriots	Indoor football	Continental Indoor Football League	
Port Huron Pirates	Indoor football	Continental Indoor Football League	
Port Huron Predators	Indoor football	Continental Indoor Football League	
Flint Flames	Indoor football	Indoor Football League	
West Michigan ThunderHawks	Indoor football	Indoor Football League	
Detroit Caesars	Softball	American Professional Slo-Pitch League	Disbanded in 1979.
Detroit Auto Kings	Softball	North American Softball League	Disbanded in 1980.
Detroit Ignition	Indoor soccer	Xtreme Soccer League	League folded in 2009
Detroit Safari	Indoor soccer	Continental Indoor Soccer League	League folded in 1997.
Detroit Lightning	Indoor soccer	Professional	Relocated in 1980 to become the San Francisco Fog (MISL)
Detroit Express	Soccer	North American Soccer League	1981, Moved to become Washington Diplomats, Lasted 1 year. League folded in 1984
Kalamazoo Kingdom	Soccer	USL Premier Development League	Folded in 2006.
Lansing Ignite FC	Soccer	USL League One	Folded
Michigan Hawks	Soccer	W-League	Folded after the 2008 season.
Michigan Phoenix	Soccer	Women's Premier Soccer League	Left the WPSL and terminated in 2006
West Michigan Edge	Soccer	USL Premier Development League	Folded after the 2008 season.
West Michigan Firewomen	Soccer	W-League	
Grand Rapids Chicks	Women's baseball	All-American Girls Professional Baseball League	League folded in 1954.
Kalamazoo Lassies	Women's baseball	All-American Girls Professional Baseball League	League folded in 1954.
Muskegon Belles	Women's baseball	All-American Girls Professional Baseball League	League folded in 1954.
Muskegon Lassies	Women's baseball	All-American Girls Professional Baseball League	Moved to Kalamazoo in 1950.

== See also ==
- List of Michigan sport championships
- List of ice hockey teams in Michigan
