= Mid Michigan Derby Girls =

Roller derby league

- Metro area: Mount Morris, MI
- Country: United States
- Founded: 2008
- Track type(s): Flat
- Venue: Skateland Arena
- Affiliations: WFTDA
- Website: www.midmichiganderbygirls.com

The Mid Michigan Derby Girls (MMDG) is a roller derby league based in Mount Morris, Michigan. Founded in 2008, the league consists of a single team, which competes against teams from other leagues.

Mid Michigan was founded in July 2008, and claims that it was the fifth roller derby league in the state of Michigan. It began its first season in September 2009, and in November it was accepted as a member of the Women's Flat Track Derby Association Apprentice Program. At some point the league has left the program, and are not listed as a member, apprentice or otherwise, as of April 2017.

The league quickly developed a local rivalry with the Flint City Derby Girls, and it implemented an annual bootcamp aimed at prospective skaters. By 2012, its skaters came from a variety of backgrounds, including a truck driver and a hairdresser.
