= Muddy River Rollers =

Roller derby league

- Metro area: Moncton, NB
- Country: Canada
- Founded: 2010
- Teams: Lumbersmacks (A team); Axekickers (B team)
- Track type: Flat
- Venue: Arthur J. LeBlanc Arena
- Affiliations: WFTDA
- Website: www.muddyriverrollers.com

The Muddy River Rollers (MRR) is a women's flat track roller derby league based in Moncton, New Brunswick. Founded in 2010, the league consists of two travel teams, which compete against teams from other leagues. Muddy River is a member of the Women's Flat Track Derby Association (WFTDA).

== History ==
The league was founded in May 2010. It was playing bouts by the following year, when its away bout against the Halifax Roller Derby Association drew in a capacity crowd of eight hundred fans.

In September 2012, Muddy River competed at the Roller Derby Association of Canada's first Atlantic Canada Roller Derby Championship, beating the Fog City Rollers to win the tournament and qualify for the following year's national championship.

Muddy River was accepted as a member of the Women's Flat Track Derby Association Apprentice Program in April 2013, and became a full WFTDA member in October 2014. Muddy River received their first ranking as a WFTDA member with the May 31, 2015 rankings update, debuting at 99 overall.

== WFTDA rankings ==
Season	Final ranking	Playoffs	Championship
2015	107 WFTDA	DNQ	DNQ
2016	90 WFTDA	DNQ	DNQ
2017	127 WFTDA	DNQ	DNQ
2018	119 WFTDA	DNQ	DNQ
