= Southern Maryland Roller Derby =

Women's roller derby league

- Metro area: Waldorf, MD
- Country: United States
- Founded: 2012
- Track type(s): Flat
- Venue: Capital Clubhouse and Waldorf Skate Center
- Affiliations: WFTDA
- Org. type: Federal Non-Profit
- Website: somdrollerderby.org

Southern Maryland Roller Derby (SMRD) is a women's flat track roller derby league based in Waldorf, Maryland. Founded in 2011, the league consists of a single team which competes against teams from other leagues, and is a member of the Women's Flat Track Derby Association (WFTDA).

== History ==
Southern Maryland Roller Derby was founded in 2012 by five co-founders. The league first bouted in 2014, with their first road game against Five 40 Roller Girls in May, and their first home game against Salisbury Roller Girls in July.

== WFTDA ==
Southern Maryland entered the WFTDA Apprentice Program in January 2015, and was made a full member of the WFTDA in January 2016.

== WFTDA rankings ==
| Season | Final ranking | Playoffs | Championship |
|---|---|---|---|
| 2016 | 312 WFTDA | N/A | N/A |
| 2017 | 299 WFTDA | DNQ | DNQ |
| 2018 | NR WFTDA | DNQ | DNQ |

- NR = no end-of-year ranking assigned
