= BBRG =

BBRG may refer to:

- Bravo Brio Restaurant Group, a Columbus, Ohio restaurant management company operating Bravo!, Cucina Italiana and Brio restaurants
- Black-n-Bluegrass RollerGirls, a roller derby team
