= RCRG =

RCRG may refer to:

- Radioactive City RollerGirls, from Paducah, Kentucky
- Rainy City Roller Girls, from Manchester in England
- Rat City Rollergirls, from Seattle, Washington
- Royal City Roller Girls, from Guelph, Ontario
- Rubber City Rollergirls, from Akron, Ohio
