= HCRD =

HCRD may stand for:

- Harm City Roller Derby, a men's roller derby league based in Baltimore
- Harbor City Roller Dames, a women's roller derby league based in Duluth, Minnesota
- Hillcrest Research and Development, a small tech company based in Windham, Maine
