= RCRD =

RCRD can refer to:

- RCRD LBL, an MP3 download website
- Rainy City Roller Dolls, a roller derby league from Centralia, Washington
- Rat City Roller Derby, a roller derby league from Seattle, Washington
- Richter City Roller Derby, a roller derby league from Wellington, New Zealand
- Roc City Roller Derby, a roller derby league from Rochester, New York
