= Corn-fed =

Corn-fed, Corn fed, or Cornfed may refer to:

== Comics and animation ==
- Corn Fed Comics, an underground comix by Kim Deitch
- "Cornfed", an android character from the Livewires comic book limited series
- "Cornfed", a pig from the Duckman animated sitcom

== Other ==
- Corn Fed, a 2006 album by Shannon Brown
- Cornfed Derby Dames, a women's flat track roller derby league in Muncie, Indiana, United States
- Corn-fed beef, beef from cattle that is raised on corn (maize) rather than pasture
- Paul 'Cornfed' Schneider, prisoner whose dogs caused the Death of Diane Whipple
