= Roller Derby of Central Kentucky =

Roller derby league

- Metro area: Lexington, KY
- Country: United States
- Founded: 2006
- Teams: ROCK (women); Pebbles (junior)
- Track type: Flat
- Venue: Lexington Convention Center
- Affiliations: WFTDA
- Website: rollerderbyofcentralky.com

Roller Derby of Central Kentucky (ROCK) is a women's flat track roller derby league based in Lexington, Kentucky. Founded in 2006, the league consists of two teams (the ROCK Stars and the Indie ROCKers), which compete against teams from other leagues. The associated junior roller derby team went under during the pandemic. Roller Derby of Central Kentucky is a member of the Women's Flat Track Derby Association (WFTDA).

== History ==
ROCK briefly merged with a league based in Richmond, Kentucky, but this was dissolved in late 2007, ROCK re-establishing an independent existence. It played its first exhibition game in December, and started its first full season in 2008. At the time, it had two intraleague teams, the Bourbon Brawlers and Sour Scouts, although these were later dissolved. By 2012, the league was playing an 11-game season, competing against leagues such as the Black-n-Bluegrass Rollergirls.

Central Kentucky was accepted as a member of the Women's Flat Track Derby Association Apprentice Program in January 2012, and it became a full WFTDA member in September 2013.

== WFTDA rankings ==
| Season | Final ranking | Playoffs | Championship |
|---|---|---|---|
| 2015 | 267 WFTDA | DNQ | DNQ |
| 2016 | 297 WFTDA | DNQ | DNQ |
| 2017 | 322 WFTDA | DNQ | DNQ |
| 2018 | 267 WFTDA | DNQ | DNQ |
