= LCRD =

LCRD may stand for:

- Lake City Roller Dolls, roller derby league based in Warsaw, Indiana
- Laser Communication Relay Demonstration, NASA mission
- Lava City Roller Dolls, roller derby league based in Bend, Oregon
