= BBDD =

BBDD may refer to:

- Battle Born Derby Demons, roller derby league based in Reno, Nevada
- Birmingham Blitz Derby Dames, roller derby league based in Birmingham in England
