= WFTDA Apprentice Program =

Roller derby apprentice program

Women's Flat Track Derby Association Apprentice
- WFTDA Apprentice logo
- Sport: Roller derby
- Founded: 2009
- Replaced by: WFTDA New Member Program, 2019
- No. of teams: 49 (As of 16 February 2018)
- Country: Argentina; Australia; Belgium; Denmark; Finland; France; Italy; Mexico; Norway; Peru; Poland; Portugal; South Africa; Spain; Sweden; United Kingdom; United States
- Website: wftda.org/apprentice-program

The Women's Flat Track Derby Association Apprentice was the program affiliate of the Women's Flat Track Derby Association (WFTDA). In operation from 2009 until early 2019, the Apprentice Program served to onboard new member leagues into the WFTDA. In February 2019, the WFTDA announced it was retiring the program, to be replaced with a new "New Member Program" in the near future.

== History ==
In July 2009, the WFTDA announced its new apprentice program for aspiring member leagues that replaced its traditional membership application process. The program is designed to act as a "WFTDA 101" tutorial, and will match new leagues with an established WFTDA mentor, who will guide the apprentice through the processes and requirements necessary to becoming a full member. Upon completion of the program, apprentice leagues will have the knowledge (and the recommendations) needed to apply for full WFTDA membership. The program ensures that applicants adhere to WFTDA standards for games, events and structure, and once accepted into the WFTDA, member teams qualify for international rankings.

In November 2009 the WFTDA opened for worldwide membership and the London Rollergirls became the first league outside North America to join as apprentice members.

In June 2010, the WFTDA announced the first round of Apprentice league graduates, and formed two new regions outside of the United States.

== Graduate leagues ==
Note: some leagues have changed their names since graduation from the Apprentice Program. The names of such leagues at the time of their graduation are preserved in the table below.

League	Metro area	Country	Admitted	Graduated	Notes
10th Mountain Roller Dolls	Gypsum, CO	United States	19 January 2015	28 March 2016	
2×4 Roller Derby	Buenos Aires	Argentina	26 April 2013	8 January 2016	
301 Derby Dames	La Plata, MD	United States	16 January 2017	11 December 2018	
580 Rollergirls	Lawton, OK	United States	31 January 2013	22 December 2014	
A'Salt Creek Roller Girls	Casper, WY	United States	18 October 2012	3 July 2014	
Aalborg Roller Derby	Aalborg	Denmark	13 October 2017	11 December 2018	
Acadiana Rollergirls	Lafayette, LA	United States	26 April 2013	22 December 2014	
Adelaide Roller Derby	Adelaide	Australia	24 January 2014	17 March 2015	
Albany All Stars Roller Derby	Albany, NY	United States	29 October 2013	22 December 2014	
Albany Roller Derby League	Albany	Australia	24 July 2017	11 December 2018	
Amsterdam Roller Derby	Amsterdam	Netherlands	29 October 2013	22 December 2014	
Anchor City Rollers	Halifax, NS	Canada	13 August 2018	13 February 2019	
Ann Arbor Derby Dimes	Ann Arbor, MI	United States	16 July 2012	23 December 2013	
Appalachian Rollergirls	Banner Elk, NC	United States	18 October 2012	11 March 2014	
Ark Valley High Rollers	Salida, CO	United States	13 April 2011	1 December 2011	
As Brigantias Roller Derby	A Coruña	Spain	15 February 2018	13 February 2019	
Assault City Roller Derby	Syracuse, NY	United States	13 July 2011	6 June 2013	
Auburn Gold Diggers Roller Derby	Auburn, CA	United States	27 October 2016	29 January 2018	
Auckland Roller Derby League	Auckland	New Zealand	18 October 2012	8 January 2016	
Auld Reekie Roller Derby	Edinburgh	Scotland	5 October 2010	1 September 2011	
Aurora 88s Roller Derby League	Aurora, IL	United States	2 October 2014	8 January 2016	
B.M.O. Roller Derby Girls	Brest	France	16 January 2017	13 February 2019	
Babe City Rollers	Bemidji, MN	United States	8 July 2010	1 June 2011	
Baja Roller Derby	Baja	Mexico	28 May 2018	13 February 2019	
Bakersfield Diamond Divas	Bakersfield, CA	United States	18 October 2012	3 July 2014	
Bangor Roller Derby	Bangor, ME	United States	29 October 2013	8 January 2016	
Barbed Wire Betties	DeKalb, IL	United States	6 July 2016	12 July 2017	
Barcelona Roller Derby	Barcelona	Spain	24 January 2014	17 March 2015	
Barockcity Roller Derby	Ludwigsburg	Germany	6 April 2015	28 March 2016	
Battle Creek Cereal Killers	Bellevue, MI	United States	24 January 2014	22 December 2014	
Bay City Rollers	Hawke's Bay	New Zealand	17 October 2018	13 February 2019	
Bay State Brawlers Roller Derby	Brighton, MA	United States	31 January 2013	3 July 2014	
Beach Brawl Sk8r Dolls	Fort Walton Beach, FL	United States	19 January 2015	8 January 2016	
Beach Cities Roller Derby	Long Beach, CA	United States	13 August 2018	13 February 2019	
Bear City Roller Derby	Berlin	Germany	5 October 2010	1 March 2012	
Beckley Area Derby Dames	Beckley, WV	United States	2 October 2014	8 January 2016	
Beet City Bombers	Boise, ID	United States	13 April 2016	13 February 2019	
Belfast Roller Derby	Belfast	Northern Ireland	2 May 2014	22 December 2014	
Beloit Bombshells	Beloit, WI	United States	13 April 2016	20 March 2017	
Bergen Roller Derby	Bergen	Norway	15 February 2018	13 February 2019	
Birmingham Blitz Dames	Birmingham	England	2 October 2014	23 September 2015	League merged with Central City Roller Derby
Bisman Bombshellz Roller Derby	Mandan, ND	United States	24 July 2017	5 June 2018	
Black-n-Bluegrass Rollergirls	Latonia, KY	United States	8 April 2010	1 March 2012	
Black Diamond Roller Derby	Troy, PA	United States	27 October 2016	29 January 2018	
Black Rose Rollers	Hanover, PA	United States	31 January 2012	3 December 2012	
Bloody Wheels Roller Derby Torino	Turin	Italy	16 January 2017	29 January 2018	
Blue Ridge Rollergirls	Asheville, NC	United States	5 October 2010	1 March 2012	
Bogotá Bone Breakers	Bogotá	Colombia	6 April 2015	23 December 2016	
Boom Town Derby Dames	Wasilla, AK	United States	6 April 2015	17 June 2016	
Border City Brawlers	Windsor, ON	Canada	16 July 2012	23 December 2013	
Boulder County Bombers	Longmont, CO	United States	16 July 2012	10 September 2013	
Bradentucky Bombers Roller Derby League	Bradenton, FL	United States	13 October 2017	11 December 2018	
Brandywine Roller Girls	Downingtown, PA	United States	18 October 2012	6 June 2013	
Brighton Rockers Roller Derby	East Sussex	England	19 January 2015	12 July 2017	
Brussels Derby Pixies	Brussels	Belgium	24 January 2014	22 June 2015	
Buenos Aires Roller Derby	Buenos Aires	Argentina	24 July 2017	13 February 2019	
BuxMont Roller Derby Dolls	Hatfield, PA	United States	27 October 2016	29 January 2018	
Cajun Rollergirls	Houma, LA	United States	5 November 2009	7 March 2013	
Calgary Roller Derby Association	Calgary, AB	Canada	31 January 2013	23 December 2013	
Canberra Roller Derby League	Canberra	Australia	26 April 2013	2 October 2014	
Cape Fear Roller Girls	Wilmington, NC	United States	8 July 2010	1 June 2011	
Cape Girardeau Roller Derby	Cape Girardeau, MO	United States	19 October 2015	23 December 2016	
Cape Town Rollergirls	Cape Town	South Africa	6 April 2015	13 February 2019	
Capital City Crushers	Topeka, KS	United States	19 January 2015	29 January 2018	
Capital City Derby Dolls	Ottawa, ON	Canada	24 January 2014	8 January 2016	
Castle Rock n Rollers	Castle Rock, CO	United States	8 April 2010	1 June 2011	
Cedar Rapids RollerGirls	Cedar Rapids, IA	United States	31 January 2012	10 September 2013	
Cedar Valley Derby Divas	Waterloo, IA	United States	16 July 2012	6 June 2013	
Cen-Tex Rollergirls	Temple, TX	United States	31 January 2012	10 September 2013	
Central Arkansas Roller Derby	Little Rock, AR	United States	29 October 2013	22 December 2014	
Central California Area Derby	Fresno, CA	United States	13 January 2011	22 June 2015	
Central City Roller Derby	Birmingham	England	13 July 2011	1 March 2012	League merged with Birmingham Blitz Dames
Central New York Roller Derby	Utica, NY	United States	1 September 2009	1 September 2010	
Central Ohio Roller Dolls	Mount Vernon, OH	United States	19 January 2015	28 March 2016	
Charlotte Rollergirls	Charlotte, NC	United States	8 April 2010	1 June 2011	
Charlottesville Derby Dames	Charlottesville, VA	United States	31 January 2012	3 December 2012	
Chattanooga Roller Girls	Chattanooga, TN	United States	8 April 2010	7 September 2012	
Chemical Valley Rollergirls	Charleston, WV	United States	26 April 2013	3 July 2014	
Cherry City Derby Girls	Salem, OR	United States	8 July 2010	3 December 2012	
Cheyenne Capidolls	Cheyenne, WY	United States	31 January 2012	7 September 2012	
Chicago Outfit Roller Derby	Chicago, IL	United States	1 September 2009	17 June 2010	
Chippewa Valley Rollergirls	Eau Claire, WI	United States	31 January 2013	3 July 2014	
Choice City Rebels	Fort Collins, CO	United States	8 July 2010	1 March 2011	
Circle City Derby Girls	Indianapolis, IN	United States	13 April 2011	1 June 2012	
Classic City Rollergirls	Athens, GA	United States	13 January 2011	1 March 2012	
C-Max Roller Derby	Johannesburg	South Africa	2 October 2014	28 March 2016	
Coastal Assassins Roller Derby	Golden Beach	Australia	19 October 2015	13 February 2019	
Cologne Roller Derby	Cologne	Germany	19 January 2015	28 March 2016	
Columbia Quad Squad	Columbia, SC	United States	13 April 2011	1 March 2012	
CoMo Derby Dames	Columbia, MO	United States	8 July 2010	1 March 2012	
Confluence Crush Roller Derby	St. Louis, MO	United States	31 January 2013	23 December 2013	
Convict City Rollers	Moonah	Australia	8 September 2014	8 January 2016	
Copenhagen Roller Derby	Copenhagen	Denmark	18 October 2012	23 December 2013	
Cornfed Derby Dames	Muncie, IN	United States	16 July 2012	10 September 2013	
Cowboy Capital Rollergirls	Stephenville, TX	United States	31 January 2013	10 September 2013	
Crime City Rollers	Malmö	Sweden	13 July 2011	1 June 2012	
Crossroads City Derby Girls	Las Cruces, NM	United States	18 October 2012	3 July 2014	
Croydon Roller Derby	Croydon	England	6 April 2015	28 March 2016	League disbanded
Dark River Derby Coalition	Quincy, IL	United States	24 January 2014	22 December 2014	
Dead End Derby	Christchurch	New Zealand	6 July 2016	12 July 2017	
Dead River Derby	Marquette, MI	United States	22 January 2016	29 January 2018	
Demolition City Roller Derby	Evansville, IN	United States	1 September 2009	17 June 2010	
Denali Destroyer Dolls	Wasilla, AK	United States	18 October 2012	10 September 2013	
Derby Revolution of Bakersfield	Bakersfield, CA	United States	9 December 2009	1 December 2010	
Des Moines Derby Dames	Des Moines, IA	United States	5 October 2010	1 September 2011	
Devil Dog Derby Dames	Okinawa	Japan	16 July 2012	11 March 2014	
Diamond State Roller Girls	Wilmington, DE	United States	19 January 2010	3 December 2012	
Dirty Jersey Roller Derby	Hazlet, NJ	United States	24 July 2017	3 September 2018	
Dirty River Roller Grrrls	Turku	Finland	2 October 2014	23 September 2015	
Dock City Rollers	Gothenburg	Sweden	2 May 2014	23 September 2015	
Dockyard Derby Dames	Tacoma, WA	United States	19 January 2010	1 December 2010	
Dolly Rockit Rollers	Leicester	England	18 October 2012	3 July 2014	
Dom City Dolls	Utrecht	Netherlands	13 April 2016	23 December 2016	
Downriver Roller Dolls	Southgate, MI	United States	19 October 2015	28 September 2016	
Druid City Derby	Tuscaloosa, AL	United States	17 October 2018	13 February 2019	
Dub City Derby Girls	Boca Raton, FL	United States	29 October 2013	22 December 2014	
Dublin Roller Derby	Dublin	Ireland	29 October 2013	22 December 2014	
Dundee Roller Derby	Dundee	Scotland	22 January 2016	20 March 2017	
Dunedin Derby	Dunedin	New Zealand	6 April 2015	23 December 2016	
Dupage Derby Dames	Chicago, IL	United States	29 October 2013	2 October 2014	
Durham Region Roller Derby	Whitby, ON	Canada	-	13 February 2019	
Durango Roller Girls	Durango, CO	United States	16 July 2012	3 July 2014	
East Vic Roller Derby	Melbourne	Australia	24 July 2017	11 December 2018	
Echo City Knockouts Roller Derby	Kailua-Kona, HI	United States	16 January 2017	29 January 2018	
Eerie Rollergirls	Erie, PA	United States	29 October 2013	22 December 2014	
Eindhoven Rockcity Rollers	Eindhoven	Netherlands	8 September 2014	28 March 2016	
El Paso Roller Derby	El Paso, TX	United States	31 January 2012	11 March 2014	
Enchanted Mountain Roller Derby	Allegany, NY	United States	2 May 2014	20 March 2017	
Enid Roller Girls	Enid, OK	United States	16 July 2012	6 June 2013	
E-Ville Roller Derby	Edmonton	Canada	19 January 2015	28 March 2016	
Eves of Destruction	Victoria, BC	Canada	27 October 2016	29 January 2018	
Fairbanks Rollergirls	Fairbanks, Alaska	United States	8 April 2010	1 June 2011	
Fargo Moorhead Derby Girls	Fargo, ND	United States	13 April 2011	1 March 2012	
Faultline Derby Devilz	Hollister, CA	United States	17 October 2018	13 February 2019	
Fernie Roller Derby	Fernie, British Columbia	Canada	19 January 2015	23 September 2015	
Five 40 Roller Girls	Fredericksburg, VA	United States	24 January 2014	22 December 2014	
Flint Roller Derby	Flint, MI	United States	13 January 2011	3 September 2018	Left program as "Flint City"; re-entered October 2017
Fog City Rollers	Saint John, NB	Canada	26 April 2013	28 September 2016	
Forest City Derby Girls	London, ON	Canada	18 October 2012	10 September 2013	
Fort Myers Derby Girls	Fort Myers, FL	United States	16 July 2012	6 June 2013	
Fox Cityz Foxz	Oshkosh, WI	United States	6 October 2009	1 September 2010	
Free State Roller Derby	Rockville, MD	United States	21 July 2015	23 December 2016	
Gainesville Roller Rebels	Gainesville, FL	United States	31 January 2012	3 December 2012	
Gallatin Roller Girlz	Bozeman, MT	United States	24 January 2014	23 September 2015	
Garden Island Renegade Rollerz	Kauai Island, HI	United States	-	13 February 2019	
Garden State Rollergirls	Newark, NJ	United States	1 September 2009	17 June 2010	
Gem City Rollergirls	Dayton, OH	United States	November 2010	23 December 2013	
Go-Go Gent Roller Derby	Ghent	Belgium	13 January 2011	3 December 2012	
Glasgow Roller Derby	Glasgow	Scotland	13 July 2011	1 June 2012	
Glass City Rollers	Toledo, OH	United States	8 April 2010	1 March 2012	
Gold Coast Derby Grrls	Fort Lauderdale, FL	United States	8 July 2010	1 March 2011	
Gorge Roller Girls	Hood River, OR	United States	22 January 2016	12 July 2017	
Gothenburg Roller Derby	Gothenburg	Sweden	26 April 2013	17 March 2015	
Grand Junction Roller Girls	Grand Junction, CO	United States	27 October 2011	22 December 2014	
Granite State Roller Derby	Concord, NH	United States	16 July 2012	23 December 2013	
Gray City Rebels	São Paulo	Brazil	31 January 2013	8 January 2016	
Greater Toronto Area Rollergirls	Toronto, ON	Canada	13 July 2011	23 December 2013	
Greenbrier River Rollers	Lewisburg, WV	United States	22 January 2016	20 March 2017	
Green Mountain Derby Dames	Burlington, VT	United States	6 October 2009	1 September 2010	
Greensboro Roller Derby	Greensboro, NC	United States	16 July 2012	6 June 2013	
Greenville Derby Dames	Greenville, SC	United States	16 July 2012	6 June 2013	
Happy Valley Derby Darlins	Salem, UT	United States	16 July 2012	23 December 2013	
Hard Breaking Dolls	Prague	Czech Republic	13 August 2018	13 February 2019	
Harbor City Roller Dames	Duluth, MN	United States	27 October 2011	6 June 2013	
Harpies Roller Derby Milano	Milan	Italy	21 July 2015	28 September 2016	
Hartford Area Roller Derby	Manchester, CT	United States	31 January 2013	23 December 2013	
Heart of Appalachia Roller Derby	Charleston, WV	United States	29 October 2013	22 December 2014	
Nottingham Hellfire Harlots	Nottingham	England	18 October 2012	23 December 2013	
Hellions of Troy Roller Derby	Saratoga Springs, NY	United States	27 October 2011	3 December 2012	
Hell's Orchard Roller Derby	Marietta, OH	United States	27 October 2016	29 January 2018	
Helsinki Roller Derby	Helsinki	Finland	13 July 2011	7 September 2012	
Hiedras Roller Derby	Córdoba	Argentina	24 July 2017	13 February 2019	
High Altitude Roller Derby	Flagstaff, AZ	United States	19 October 2015	23 December 2016	
Hot Wheel Roller Derby	Leeds	England	19 October 2015	17 June 2016	
Hub City Derby Dames	Hattiesburg, MS	United States	8 July 2010	7 March 2013	
Hudson Valley Horrors Roller Derby	Kingston, NY	United States	5 November 2009	1 December 2010	
Hulls Angels Roller Derby	Kingston-upon-Hull	England	6 April 2015	28 March 2016	
Humboldt Roller Derby	Eureka, CA	United States	8 April 2010	10 January 2012	
Hurricane Alley Roller Derby	Corpus Christi, TX	United States	19 January 2015	17 June 2016	
ICT Rollergirls	Wichita, KS	United States	6 October 2009	17 June 2010	
IE Derby Divas	Grand Terrace, CA	United States	15 February 2018	13 February 2019	
Ithaca League of Women Rollers	Ithaca, NY	United States	13 January 2011	1 September 2011	
Jackson Hole Juggernauts	Jackson, WY	United States	8 September 2014	8 January 2016	
Jacksonville Rollergirls	Jacksonville, FL	United States	6 October 2009	1 December 2010	
Jersey Shore Roller Girls	Toms River, NJ	United States	5 October 2010	1 September 2011	
Jerzey Derby Brigade	Morristown, NJ	United States	24 January 2014	22 December 2014	
Junction City Rollergirls	Ogden, UT	United States	8 April 2010	1 March 2011	
Juneau Rollergirls	Juneau, AK	United States	26 April 2013	2 October 2014	
Kallio Rolling Rainbow	Helsinki	Finland	29 October 2013	3 July 2014	
Kent Roller Girls	Herne Bay	England	-	13 February 2019	
Keweenaw Roller Girls	Hancock, MI	United States	6 April 2015	23 December 2016	
Killamazoo Derby Darlins	Kalamazoo, MI	United States	6 October 2009	1 September 2010	
Kingston Derby Girls	Kingston, ON	United States	24 January 2014	23 December 2016	
Kokeshi Rollerdolls	Okinawa	Japan	27 October 2011	6 June 2013	
Ladies of HellTown	São Paulo	Brazil	2 May 2014	28 September 2016	
Lafayette Brawlin' Dolls	Lafayette, IN	United States	8 July 2010	23 December 2013	
Lake City Roller Dolls	Warsaw, IN	United States	13 January 2011	22 December 2014	
Lansing Derby Vixens	Lansing, MI	United States	16 July 2012	6 June 2013	
Leeds Roller Dolls	Leeds	England	31 January 2012	7 March 2013	
Lehigh Valley Roller Derby	Allentown, PA	United States	1 September 2009	1 September 2010	
Les Quads des Paris	Paris	France	19 January 2015	8 January 2016	
Lilac City Rollergirls	Spokane, WA	United States	8 July 2010	1 March 2012	
Lille Roller Girls	Lille	France	19 January 2015	28 March 2016	
Limerick Roller Derby	Limerick	Ireland	19 October 2015	28 September 2016	
Lincolnshire Bombers Roller Girls	Lincoln	England	13 July 2011	1 June 2012	
Little City Rollergirls	Johnson City, TN	United States	8 July 2010	1 September 2011	
Little Steel Derby Girls	Youngstown, OH	United States	27 October 2011	1 June 2012	
Liverpool Roller Birds	Liverpool	England	17 October 2018	13 February 2019	
Loco City Derby Girls	Stockton, CA	United States	19 October 2015	12 July 2017	
London Rockin' Rollers	London	England	18 October 2012	10 September 2013	
London Rollergirls	London	England	5 November 2009	17 June 2010	
Los Alamos Derby Dames	Los Alamos, NM	United States	13 April 2016	20 March 2017	
Lowcountry Highrollers	Charleston, SC	United States	13 January 2011	1 December 2011	
Lutece Destroyeuse	Montreuil	France	6 April 2015	17 June 2016	
Magic City Rollers	Billings, MT	United States	13 April 2016	29 January 2018	
Magnolia Roller Vixens	Jackson, MS	United States	13 January 2011	3 December 2012	
Mainland Misfits Roller Derby Association	Vancouver, BC	Canada	6 April 2015	8 January 2016	
Marietta Derby Darlins	Marietta, GA	United States	24 January 2014	22 June 2015	
Mason Dixon Roller Vixens	Frederick, MD	United States	8 April 2010	1 March 2012	
Mass Attack Roller Derby	Taunton, MA	United States	16 July 2012	3 July 2014	
Maui Roller Girls	Kahului, HI	United States	13 April 2016	23 December 2016	
McLean County Missfits	Danvers, IL	United States	13 July 2011	3 December 2012	
MedCity Mafia Roller Derby	Rochester, MN	United States	2 May 2014	23 September 2015	
Metropolitan Roller Derby Chile	Santiago	Chile	2 October 2014	20 March 2017	
Mexico City Roller Derby	Mexico City	Mexico	13 October 2017	13 February 2019	
Mid-Atlantic Roller Derby	Norfolk, VA	United States	19 January 2015	11 December 2018	
Mid Iowa Rollers	Des Moines, IA	United States	5 October 2010	1 December 2011	
Mid-State Sisters of Skate	Schofield, WI	United States	16 July 2012	6 June 2013	
Middle Georgia Derby Demons	Macon, GA	United States	15 February 2018	13 February 2019	
Middlesbrough Milk Rollers	Middlesbrough	England	26 April 2013	3 July 2014	
Misery Loves Company Roller Derby	San Jose, CA	United States	27 October 2016	27 March 2018	
Mission City Roller Derby	Santa Barbara, CA	United States	19 January 2015	23 September 2015	
Mississippi Rollergirls	Ocean Springs, MS	United States	27 October 2011	3 December 2012	
Mississippi Valley Mayhem	La Crosse, WI	United States	19 January 2010	3 December 2012	
Mo-Kan Roller Girlz	Joplin, MO	United States	18 October 2012	11 March 2014	
Molly Rogers Rollergirls	Melbourne, FL	United States	24 January 2014	17 March 2015	
Monterey Bay Derby Dames	Monterey, CA	United States	13 July 2011	23 December 2013	
Morgantown Roller Vixens	Morgantown, WV	United States	6 April 2015	17 June 2016	
Mother State Roller Derby	Richmond, VA	United States	16 July 2012	6 June 2013	
Muddy River Rollers	Moncton, NB	Canada	26 April 2013	2 October 2014	
Munich Rolling Rebels	Munich	Germany	19 January 2015	8 January 2016	
Muscogee Roller Girls	Columbus, GA	United States	2 May 2014	22 June 2015	
Namur Roller Girls	Namur	Belgium	24 January 2014	20 March 2017	
Nantes Derby Girls	Nantes	France	29 October 2013	2 October 2014	
Naughty Pines Derby Dames	Laramie, WY	United States	2 May 2014	17 June 2016	
New Hampshire Roller Derby	Nashua, NH	United States	1 September 2009	17 June 2010	
New Jersey Roller Derby	Morristown, NJ	United States	26 April 2013	3 July 2014	
Newcastle Roller Girls	Newcastle upon Tyne	England	29 October 2013	3 July 2014	
Newcastle Roller Derby League	Newcastle	Australia	15 February 2018	13 February 2019	
NEO Rock n' Rollergirls	Akron, OH	United States	1 September 2009	1 September 2010	
Nice Roller Derby	Nice	France	24 July 2017	13 February 2019	
Nidaros Roller Derby	Trondheim	Norway	18 October 2012	10 September 2013	
Nor Cal Rollergirls	Chico, CA	United States	21 July 2015	11 December 2018	Left program; re-entered Feb 2018
Norrkoping Roller Derby	Norrköping	Sweden	15 February 2018	11 December 2018	
Northern Arizona Roller Derby	Prescott, AZ	United States	19 January 2015	29 January 2018	
Northern Brisbane Rollers	Brisbane	Australia	29 October 2013	8 January 2016	
Northside Rollers	Melbourne	Australia	29 October 2013	22 December 2014	
North Texas Derby Revolution	Denton, TX	United States	16 July 2012	11 March 2014	
Northwest Derby Company	Port Orchard, WA	United States	31 January 2013	17 March 2015	
NOVA Roller Derby	Leesburg, VA	United States	13 April 2016	20 March 2017	
NRV Rollergirls	Christiansburg, VA	United States	8 July 2010	1 December 2011	
Ohio Valley Rollergirls	Martins Ferry, OH	United States	2 May 2014	23 September 2015	
Oklahoma City Roller Derby	Oklahoma City, OK	United States	8 July 2010	1 March 2011	
Old Capitol City Roller Girls	Iowa City, IA	United States	5 October 2010	10 January 2012	
One Love Roller Dolls	Antwerp	Belgium	16 July 2012	2 October 2014	
Orangeville Rollergirls	Orangeville, Ontario	Canada	19 January 2015	28 March 2016	
Orlando Psycho City Derby Girls	Orlando, FL	United States	22 January 2016	23 December 2016	
Oslo Roller Derby	Oslo	Norway	31 January 2013	23 December 2013	
Oulu Roller Derby	Oulu	Finland	24 July 2017	11 December 2018	
Palouse River Rollers	Pullman, WA	United States	24 July 2017	27 March 2018	
Paper Valley Rollergirls	Appleton, WI	United States	5 November 2009	17 June 2010	
Paradise City Roller Derby	Burleigh	Australia	24 January 2014	2 October 2014	
Paradise Rollergirls	Hilo, HI	United States	13 April 2011	23 December 2013	
Paris Rollergirls	Paris	France	5 October 2010	6 June 2013	
Parliament of Pain	The Hague	Netherlands	13 April 2016	29 January 2018	
Pensacola Roller Gurlz	Pensacola, FL	United States	29 October 2013	22 December 2014	
Peninsula Roller Girls	Redwood City, CA	United States	8 September 2014	22 June 2015	
Penn Jersey Roller Derby	Philadelphia, PA	United States	6 July 2016	12 July 2017	
Perth Roller Derby	Perth	Australia	29 October 2013	22 December 2014	
Pile O'Bones Derby Club	Regina, SK	Canada	-	13 February 2019	
Pirate City Rollers	Auckland	New Zealand	27 October 2011	10 September 2013	
Plymouth City Roller Girls	Plymouth	England	6 April 2015	13 February 2019	
Port City Roller Derby	Oswego, NY	United States	29 October 2013	2 October 2014	
Port Scandalous Roller Derby	Port Angeles, WA	United States	18 October 2012	10 September 2013	
Portneuf Valley Bruisers	Pocatello, ID	United States	13 July 2011	22 December 2014	
Powder River Rousta Bout It Betties	Gillette, WY	United States	24 July 2017	13 February 2019	
Prairieland Roller Girls	Decatur, IL	United States		22 June 2015	
Prague City Roller Derby	Prague	Czech Republic	13 April 2016	12 July 2017	
Pueblo Derby Devil Dollz	Pueblo, CO	United States	5 November 2009	1 September 2010	
Quad City Rollers	Bettendorf, IA	United States	13 July 2011	23 December 2013	
Queen City Roller Girls	Buffalo, NY	United States	9 December 2009	1 September 2010	
RGV Bandidas	McAllen, TX	United States	15 February 2018	13 February 2019	
Rage City Rollergirls	Anchorage, AK	United States	8 April 2010	1 March 2011	
Rainier Rollergirls	Tacoma, WA	United States	31 January 2013	2 October 2014	
Rainy City Roller Dolls	Centralia, WA	United States	13 April 2011	3 December 2012	
Rainy City Roller Girls	Oldham	England	16 July 2012	10 September 2013	
Rated PG Roller Derby Society	British Columbia	Canada	16 January 2017	29 January 2018	
Rebellion Roller Derby	Milton Keynes	England	17 October 2018	13 February 2019	
Reading Derby Girls	Reading, PA	United States	22 January 2016	12 July 2017	
Red Stick Roller Derby	Baton Rouge, LA	United States	8 July 2010	1 December 2011	
Renegade Derby Dames	Sutton, ON	Canada	31 January 2013	11 March 2014	
Resurrection Rollergirls	Rohnert Park, CA	United States	29 October 2013	23 September 2015	
Rhein-Neckar Delta Quads	Mannheim	Germany	28 May 2018	13 February 2019	
Richland County Regulators	Columbia, SC	United States	13 July 2011	23 December 2013	
Richter City Roller Derby	Wellington	New Zealand	16 July 2012	23 December 2013	
Rideau Valley Roller Girls	Ottawa, ON	Canada	13 January 2011	1 June 2012	
River City Dames of Anarchy	Mason City, IA	United States	19 January 2015	13 February 2019	
River Valley Rollergirls	Fort Smith, AR	United States	31 January 2012	22 December 2014	
Roc City Roller Derby	Rochester, NY	United States	13 January 2011	1 September 2011	
Rock and Roller Queens	Bogotá	Colombia	16 July 2012	6 June 2013	
Rock Coast Rollers	Rockland, ME	United States	27 October 2011	11 March 2014	
Rockford Rage Women's Roller Derby	Rockford, IL	United States	1 September 2009	17 June 2010	
Rockin City Rollergirls	Round Rock, TX	United States	29 October 2013	2 October 2014	
Rocktown Rollers	Harrisonburg, VA	United States	8 July 2010	1 June 2011	
Rocky View Roller Derby Association	Airdrie, AB	Canada	21 July 2015	23 December 2016	
Rodeo City Rollergirls	Ellensburg, WA	United States	18 October 2012	23 December 2013	
Roe City Roller Derby	Calhoun, LA	United States	15 February 2018	11 December 2018	
Rogue Rollergirls	Fayetteville, NC	United States	2 May 2014	28 March 2016	
Roller Derby Bordeaux	Bordeaux	France	29 October 2013	13 February 2019	
Roller Derby Caen	Caen	France	21 July 2015	23 December 2016	
Roller Derby Dresden	Dresden	Germany	6 April 2015	17 June 2016	
Roller Derby Iceland	Hafnarfjörður	Iceland	13 August 2018	13 February 2019	
Roller Derby Karlsruhe	Karlsruhe	Germany	29 October 2013	23 September 2015	
Roller Derby Madrid	Madrid	Spain	19 October 2015	28 September 2016	
Roller Derby Metz Club	Metz	France	24 January 2014	22 December 2014	
Roller Derby Porto	Porto	Portugal	6 July 2016	13 February 2019	
Roller Derby Quebec	Quebec City, QC	Canada	8 September 2014	8 January 2016	
Roller Derby Rennes	Rennes	France	2 May 2014	29 January 2018	
Roller Girls of the Apocalypse	Rhineland-Pfalz	Germany	16 July 2012	11 March 2014	
Rollergirls of Central Kentucky	Lexington, KY	United States	31 January 2012	10 September 2013	
Rollergirls of Southern Indiana	Evansville, IN	United States	1 September 2009	17 June 2010	
Rotterdam Roller Derby	Rotterdam	Netherlands	6 July 2016	29 January 2018	
Rough Diamond Rebels	Murrieta, CA	United States	15 February 2018	11 December 2018	
Royal City Rollergirls	Guelph, ON	Canada	29 October 2013	22 December 2014	
Royal Windsor Roller Girls	Windsor	England	13 July 2011	1 June 2012	
Rubber City Rollergirls	Akron, OH	United States	19 January 2010	8 January 2016	Left program; re-entered October 2014
Ruhrpott Roller Girls	Essen	Germany	26 April 2013	2 October 2014	
Sac City Rollers	Sacramento, CA	United States	13 April 2011	1 June 2012	
Sailor City Roller Derby	Buenos Aires	Argentina	19 October 2015	28 September 2016	
Salisbury Rollergirls	Salisbury, MD	United States	16 July 2012	10 September 2013	
San Diego Roller Derby	San Diego, CA	United States	19 January 2015	8 January 2016	
San Fernando Valley Roller Derby	Van Nuys, CA	United States	31 January 2013	23 December 2013	
Santa Cruz Derby Girls	Santa Cruz, CA	United States	9 December 2009	1 September 2010	
Saskatoon Roller Derby League	Saskatoon	Canada	16 January 2017	29 January 2018	
Savannah Derby Devils	Savannah, GA	United States	16 July 2012	3 July 2014	
Seaside Siren Roller Girls	Southend-on-Sea	England	29 October 2013	8 January 2016	
Shasta Derby Dolls	Redding, CA	United States	26 April 2013	3 July 2014	
Sheffield Steel Rollergirls	Sheffield	England	16 July 2012	6 June 2013	
Shore Points Roller Derby	Williamstown, NJ	United States	31 January 2013	11 March 2014	
Sick Town Derby Dames	Corvallis, OR	United States	9 December 2009	1 June 2012	
Sierra Regional Roller Derby	Lake Tahoe, NV	United States	6 July 2016	29 January 2018	
Silicon Valley Roller Girls	San Jose, CA	United States	1 September 2009	17 June 2010	
SINtral Valley Derby Girls	Modesto, CA	United States	27 October 2016	29 January 2018	
Sioux City Roller Dames	Sioux City, IA	United States	13 April 2011	1 March 2012	
Sitka Sound Slayers	Sitka, AK	United States	22 January 2016	23 December 2016	
Skagit Valley Roller Girls	Burlington, WA	United States	19 January 2015	23 September 2015	
Snake Pit Derby Dames	Coeur d'Alene, ID	United States	26 April 2013	2 October 2014	
SoCal Derby	San Diego, CA	United States	31 January 2012	3 December 2012	
Sonoma County Roller Derby	Santa Rosa, CA	United States	6 October 2009	1 December 2010	
Soul City Sirens	Augusta, GA	United States	13 July 2011	7 March 2013	
South Bend Roller Girls	South Bend, IN	United States	13 July 2011	23 December 2013	
South Coast Roller Derby	San Clemente, CA	United States	18 October 2012	8 January 2016	Left Program, rejoined April 2015
Southern Delaware Rollergirls	Seaford, DE	United States	8 September 2014	28 March 2016	
Southern Maryland Roller Derby	Waldorf, MD	United States	19 January 2015	8 January 2016	
Southern Illinois Rollergirls	Marion, IL	United States	13 January 2011	10 January 2012	
Southern Oregon Rollergirls	Medford, OR	United States	13 April 2011	23 December 2013	
South Florida Roller Girls	Fort Pierce, FL	United States	24 January 2014	23 September 2015	
South Sea Roller Derby	Parkdale	Australia	31 January 2013	3 July 2014	
South Side Derby Dolls	Sydney	Australia	24 January 2014	8 January 2016	
South Shore Roller Girls	Hammond, IN	United States	22 January 2016	23 December 2016	
Spindletop Roller Girls	Beaumont, TX	United States	19 January 2010	1 December 2010	
Spokannibals Roller Derby	Spokane, WA	United States	15 February 2018	11 December 2018	
Springfield Rollergirls	Springfield, MO	United States	8 April 2010	1 June 2011	
St. Albert Heavenly Rollergirls	St. Albert, AB	Canada	29 October 2013	22 December 2014	
St. Chux Derby Chix	St. Charles, MO	United States	27 October 2011	7 September 2012	
St Pauli Roller Derby	Hamburg	Germany	6 April 2015	17 June 2016	
Star City Roller Girls	Roanoke, VA	United States	27 October 2011	28 March 2016	
State College Area Roller Derby	State College, PA	United States	24 January 2014	17 March 2015	
Stockholm Roller Derby	Stockholm	Sweden	27 October 2011	3 December 2012	
Storm City Roller Girls	Vancouver, WA	United States	-	13 February 2019	
Stuttgart Valley Rollergirls	Stuttgart	Germany	27 October 2011	7 March 2013	
Sun State Roller Girls	Brisbane	Australia	16 July 2012	6 June 2013	
Swansea City Roller Derby	Swansea	Wales	15 February 2018	11 December 2018	
Sydney Roller Derby League	Sydney	Australia	26 April 2013	22 December 2014	
Tampere Roller Derby	Tampere	Finland	6 April 2015	17 June 2016	
Team United Roller Derby	Urbandale, IA	United States	29 October 2013	2 October 2014	
Tenerife Roller Derby	Tenerife	Spain	21 July 2015	20 March 2017	
Terminal City Rollergirls	Vancouver, BC	Canada	5 October 2010	1 March 2011	
Terrorz Roller Derby	Columbus, IN	United States	16 January 2017	13 February 2019	
The Anguanas - Vicenza Roller Derby	Vicenza	Italy	24 July 2017	5 June 2018	
The Cannibal Marmots	Grenoble	France	13 October 2017	13 February 2019	
The Roller Derby Panthers	Sannois	France	28 May 2018	13 February 2019	
The Royal Swedish Roller Derby	Stockholm	Sweden	24 July 2017	27 March 2018	
Thunder Bay Roller Derby League	Thunder Bay, ON	Canada	2 May 2014	8 January 2016	
Tiger Bay Brawlers	Cardiff	Wales	16 July 2012	6 June 2013	
Tokyo Roller Girls	Tokyo	Japan	18 October 2012	6 June 2013	
Toronto Roller Derby	Toronto, ON	Canada	8 July 2010	1 June 2011	
Toxic Lima Roller Derby	Lima	Peru	13 October 2017	13 February 2019	
Tragic City Rollers	Birmingham, AL	United States	5 October 2010	1 March 2012	
Traverse City Roller Derby	Traverse City, MI	United States	2 October 2014	23 December 2016	
Treasure Valley Rollergirls	Boise, ID	United States	8 April 2010	1 September 2011	
Tri-City Rollergirls	Kitchener, ON	Canada	8 April 2010	1 December 2010	
Twin City Derby Girls	Champaign, IL	United States	8 July 2010	1 March 2012	
Twin City Knockers	Bossier City, LA	United States	13 April 2016	29 January 2018	
Twin State Derby	White River Junction, VT	United States	22 January 2016	23 December 2016	
Two Rivers Roller Derby	Easton, PA	United States	19 October 2015	29 January 2018	
Undead Bettys	Antioch, CA	United States	8 September 2014	22 June 2015	
Unforgiven Rollergirls	Bakersfield, CA	United States	8 September 2014	23 September 2015	
V-Town Derby Dames	Visalia, CA	United States	24 January 2014	22 December 2014	
Vasteras Roller Derby	Västerås	Sweden	19 January 2015	23 September 2015	
Ventura County Derby Darlins	Ventura, CA	United States	16 July 2012	6 June 2013	
Vette City Roller Derby	Bowling Green, KY	United States	16 July 2012	6 June 2013	
Victorian Roller Derby League	Melbourne	Australia	13 January 2011	1 December 2011	
Vienna Rollergirls	Vienna	Austria	24 January 2014	17 March 2015	
Waimea Wranglers	Kamuela, HI	United States	19 January 2015	8 January 2016	
Warsaw Hellcats Roller Girls	Warsaw	Poland	16 January 2017	13 February 2019	
Wasatch Roller Derby	Salt Lake City, UT	United States	6 October 2009	17 June 2010	
West Coast Derby Knockouts	Ventura, CA	United States	31 January 2012	6 June 2013	
Western Australia Roller Derby	Perth	Australia	16 July 2012	22 December 2014	
Western Massachusetts Roller Derby	Greenfield, MA	United States	27 October 2016	5 June 2018	
Whakatane Roller Derby League	Whakatāne	New Zealand	22 January 2016	28 September 2016	
Whidbey Island Roller Girls	Oak Harbor, WA	United States	19 January 2015	8 January 2016	
Wilkes-Barre/Scranton Roller Radicals	Scranton, PA	United States	16 July 2012	22 December 2014	
Wine Town Rollers	Temecula, CA	United States	19 January 2015	8 January 2016	
Winnipeg Roller Derby League	Winnipeg, MB	Canada	29 October 2013	22 December 2014	
Worcester Roller Derby	Worcester, MA	United States	26 April 2013	2 October 2014	
Yellow Rose Derby Girls	Fulshear, TX	United States	2 October 2014	8 January 2016	
York City Derby Dames	York, PA	United States	19 October 2015	23 December 2016	
Zurich City Rollergirlz	Zurich	Switzerland	2 May 2014	23 September 2015	

== Former members ==
Former Apprentice Program member leagues who left the program and did not become full WFTDA members are listed below.

League	Metro area	Country	Admitted	Notes
Battle Born Derby Demons	Reno, NV	United States	19 January 2010	left program
Central Maine Roller Derby	Bangor, ME	United States	29 October 2013	left program
Complot Derby Club	Santiago	Chile	6 July 2016	left Program
Eastern Iowa Outlaws	Dubuque, IA	United States	13 April 2011	left program
Enid Roller Girls	Enid, OK	United States	12 November 2019	league dissolved
Peoria Push Derby Dames	Peoria, IL	United States	16 July 2012	left program
Puerto Rico Roller Derby	San Juan, PR	Puerto Rico	April 2013	left program
Radioactive City RollerGirls	Paducah, KY	United States	13 April 2011	league dissolved
Rocket City Roller Derby	Deer Park, TX	United States	13 April 2016	left program
Stateline Roller Derby Divas	Beloit, WI	United States	13 April 2011	merged into the Beloit Bombshells
Tulsa Derby League	Sand Springs, OK	United States	27 October 2011	left program
Wheat City Roller Derby	Brandon, MB	Canada	19 October 2015	left program
