= Paradise Roller Girls =

Roller derby league

- Metro area: Hilo, HI
- Country: United States
- Founded: 2010
- Teams: Hawaiian Honey Badgers (A Team); Killer Bees (B Team); Big Island Babes (Junior)
- Track type(s): Flat
- Venue: Afook-Chinen Hilo Civic Auditorium
- Affiliations: WFTDA
- Website: www.paradiserollergirls.com

The Paradise Roller Girls (PRG) is a women's flat track roller derby league based in Hilo, Hawaii. Founded in 2010, the league is member-owned and consists of two teams, the Honey Badgers A-Team and the Killer Bees B-team; both are travel teams that compete against teams from other leagues. Paradise Roller Girls is a member of the Women's Flat Track Derby Association (WFTDA).

== History and organization ==
In April 2011, Paradise Roller Girls was accepted as a member of the Women's Flat Track Derby Association Apprentice Program. In December 2013, Paradise became a full member of the Women's Flat Track Derby Association. Paradise Roller Girls received its first WFTDA ranking in March 2015 at 216 overall.

Paradise Roller Girls played its first home bout against the Maui Roller Girls in May 2011. In September 2013, Paradise won the Hawaiian State Flat Track Derby 2013 "Battle of the Islands" played on Kauai. In April 2014, Paradise played and won their first WFTDA-sanctioned bout vs Tokyo Roller Girls. Over October 17-18 2014, Paradise hosted and won the state championship at the 2014 "Battle of the Islands" at the Hilo Civic Auditorium.

Paradise Roller Girls home games have attracted at many as 3000 spectators at their home venue, the Hilo Civic Auditorium.

PRG also runs a junior roller derby team, the Big Island Babes.

== WFTDA rankings ==
Season	Final ranking	Playoffs	Championship
2015	245 WFTDA	DNQ	DNQ
2016	284 WFTDA	DNQ	DNQ
