= RRQ =

RRQ may refer to:

- Réseau de Résistance du Québécois, Quebec nationalist group
- Rock and Roller Queens, roller derby league from Bogotá, Colombia
- Rex Regum Qeon (RRQ), Indonesian based esports organization
