= Mission City Roller Derby =

Roller derby league

- Metro area: Santa Barbara, California
- Country: United States
- Founded: 2009
- Teams: Brawlin' Betties (A team); Vicious Veronicas
- Track type: Flat
- Venue: Page Youth Center; Earl Warren Showgrounds
- Affiliations: WFTDA
- Org. type: 501(c)(3) non-profit
- Website: https://www.https://brawlinbetties.com//

Mission City Roller Derby is an all-gender flat track roller derby league based in Santa Barbara, California. Founded in 2009, Mission City is a member of the Women's Flat Track Derby Association (WFTDA).

== History ==
Mission City Roller Derby was founded in 2009. The league's A-team, the Brawlin' Betties, competed in their first home bout on July 18, 2009 against the Ventura County Derby Darlins.

Mission City Roller Derby became a 501(c)(3) non-profit organization in 2013.

The league entered the WFTDA Apprentice Program in January 2015, and was made a full member in September of the same year.
