= Glass City Rollers =

Roller derby league

- Metro area: Toledo, OH
- Country: United States
- Founded: 2007
- Track type: Flat
- Affiliations: WFTDA
- Website: https://glasscityrollerderby.org

Glass City Rollers (GCR) is a women's roller derby league based in Toledo, Ohio. Founded in 2007, the league currently consists of a single team which competes against teams from other leagues. Glass City is a member of the Women's Flat Track Derby Association (WFTDA).

== History ==
Glass City was founded in 2007 by Jessica "Betty Floored" Crossfield and others. By late 2009, the league had twenty skaters, and it opened its first season in October by playing the Fox Cityz Foxz. The league later inspired the founding of the Sandusky Rollergirls.

Glass City was accepted into the Women's Flat Track Derby Association Apprentice Program in April 2010, and became a full WFTDA member in March 2012.

== WFTDA rankings ==
Season	Final ranking	Playoffs	Championship
2013	151 WFTDA	DNQ	DNQ
2014	196 WFTDA	DNQ	DNQ
2015	236 WFTDA	DNQ	DNQ
2016	216 WFTDA	DNQ	DNQ
2017	220 WFTDA	DNQ	DNQ

- no WFTDA rankings from 2020-2022 due to COVID-19 pandemic
