= Greensboro Roller Derby =

Roller derby league

- Metro area: Greensboro, North Carolina
- Country: United States
- Founded: 2010
- Teams: Gate City All-Stars (A team); Greensboro Counterstrike (B team); Battleground Betties; Elm Street Nightmares; Mad Dollies
- Track type: Flat
- Venue: Greensboro Coliseum Complex
- Affiliations: WFTDA
- Website: www.greensbororollerderby.com

Greensboro Roller Derby is a women's flat-track roller derby league established in 2010 and based in Greensboro, North Carolina. The league consists of three home teams: the Battleground Betties, the Elm Street Nightmares, and the Mad Dollies. Each home team is named after a prominent street in Greensboro. Additionally, the league maintains two travel team, the Gate City All-Stars, which is the WFTDA charter team and competes against other WFTDA teams from around the world in sanctioned game play, and the B team, Counterstrike. Greensboro Roller Derby is a member of the Women's Flat Track Derby Association (WFTDA).

== History and organization ==
Greensboro Roller Derby was established early in 2010 by Aubrey "MollyFlogger" Lockard, The initial organizational meeting was held February 21, 2010 in Chumley's Bar in Greensboro, North Carolina, and was attended by over 70 women interested in participating in the league. Greensboro Roller Derby's first public bout was held in October, 2010, an exhibition bout between two ad hoc teams, the Brains and the Fangs. Two months later, the league held its second bout, titled "Winter Thunderland", with two other ad hoc teams, the Sugar Plum Scaries and the Nutcrackers.

In January 2011, the league formed its travel team and three home teams. In March, the travel team participated in its first interleague bout, defeating U.R.G.E. from South Carolina, 135 to 134. In April 2011, the league held its first intraleague bout, with the Battleground Betties defeating the Elm Street Nightmares, 166 to 107. In May of that year, the Gate City Rollergirls competed in their first out-of-town bout, losing to the Greenville Derby Dames in Greenville, South Carolina, 237 to 86. In October 2011, one year after the debut bout between the Brains and the Fangs, the league held its first double header bout.

In July 2012, Greensboro was accepted as a member of the Women's Flat Track Derby Association Apprentice Program, and it became a full member of the WFTDA in June 2013.

Greensboro Roller Derby is not a for-profit organization. The proceeds from each event that go beyond league expenses are donated to a charity selected for that event. The league became a 501(c)(3) organization in 2017.

== WFTDA rankings ==
Season	Final ranking	Playoffs	Championship
2013	152 WFTDA	DNQ	DNQ
2014	114 WFTDA	DNQ	DNQ
2015	108 WFTDA	DNQ	DNQ
2016	224 WFTDA	DNQ	DNQ
2017	196 WFTDA	DNQ	DNQ
2018	147 WFTDA	DNQ	DNQ

== International ==
League member Victoria “Butternut Squasher” Meeks was named to Team Philippines, and will compete at the 2018 Roller Derby World Cup in Manchester, England.
