= Warren J. Harang Jr. Municipal Auditorium =

Arena in Louisiana, United States

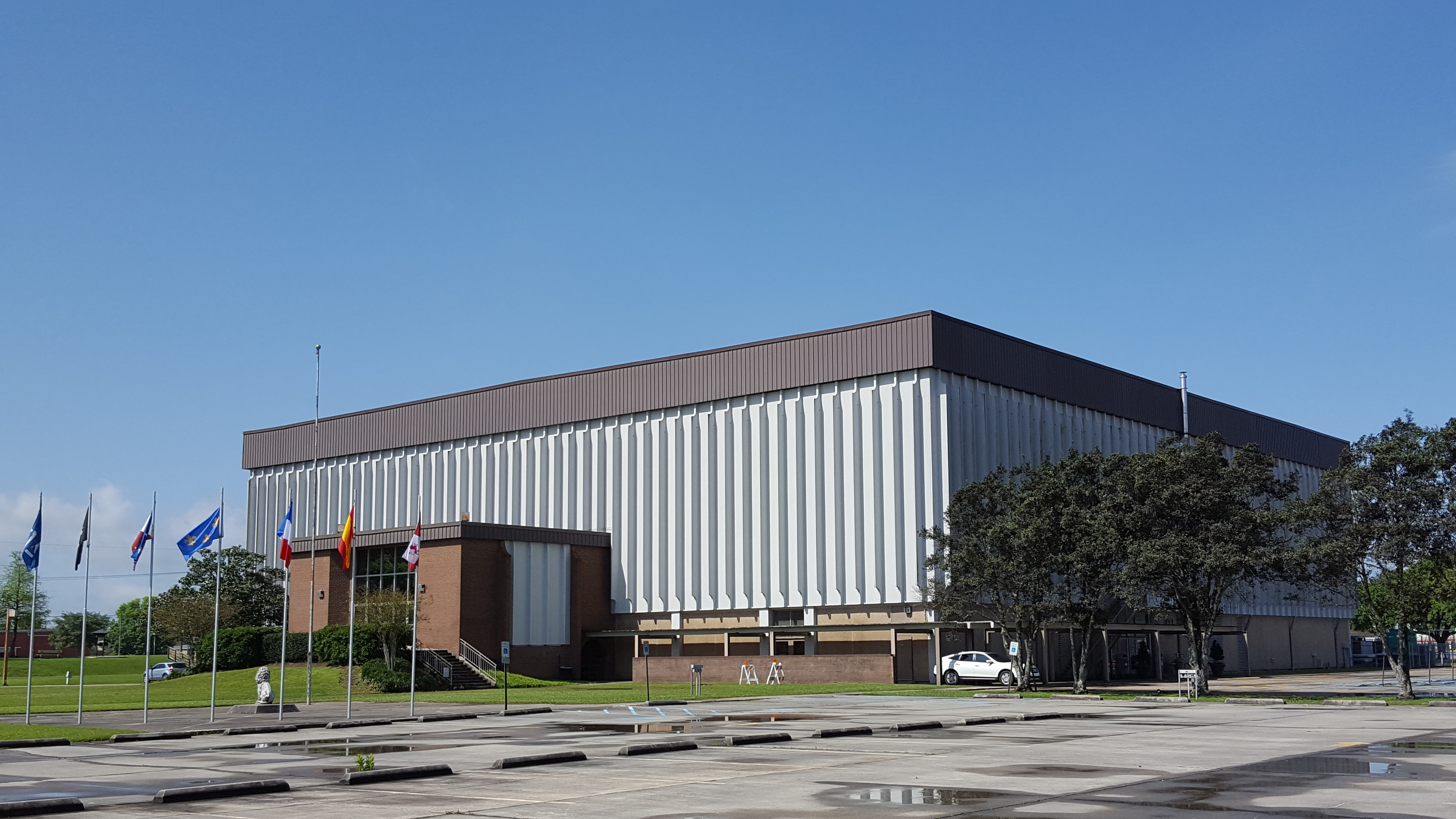
- Interactive map of Warren J. Harang Jr. Municipal Auditorium
- Full name: Warren J. Harang Jr. Municipal Auditorium
- Location: 310 North Canal Blvd. Thibodaux, Louisiana 70302
- Coordinates: 29.80352°N 90.81801°W
- Owner: City of Thibodaux, Louisiana
- Operator: City of Thibodaux, Louisiana
- Capacity: 3,500
- Surface: Multi-surface

Construction
- Opened: 1970

Tenant
- Cajun Rollergirls (WFTDA)

Website
- Official Website

The Warren J. Harang Jr. Municipal Auditorium is a 3,500-seat multi-purpose arena in Thibodaux, Louisiana. It was built in 1970 and is named in honor of Warren J. Harang Jr., the long-time mayor of Thibodaux. The facility includes a main arena and a meeting room.

== Usage ==
The arena is used to host basketball and volleyball games, professional wrestling and roller derby. The Cajun Rollergirls of the WFTDA use the arena for their home competitions.

Concerts, conventions, comedy shows and graduations are also held in the arena.

== See also ==
- List of convention centers in the United States
- List of music venues
