= Ithaca Roller Derby =

Roller derby league

- Metro area: Ithaca, New York
- Country: United States
- Founded: 2008
- Teams: SufferJets (A team), BlueStockings (B team), Ithaca League of Junior Rollers (juniors); Home Teams: Bad Apples; Grapes of Wrath
- Track type: Flat
- Venue: Cass Park Rink
- Affiliations: WFTDA, JRDA
- Org. type: 501(c)3
- Website: http://www.ithacarollerderby.com

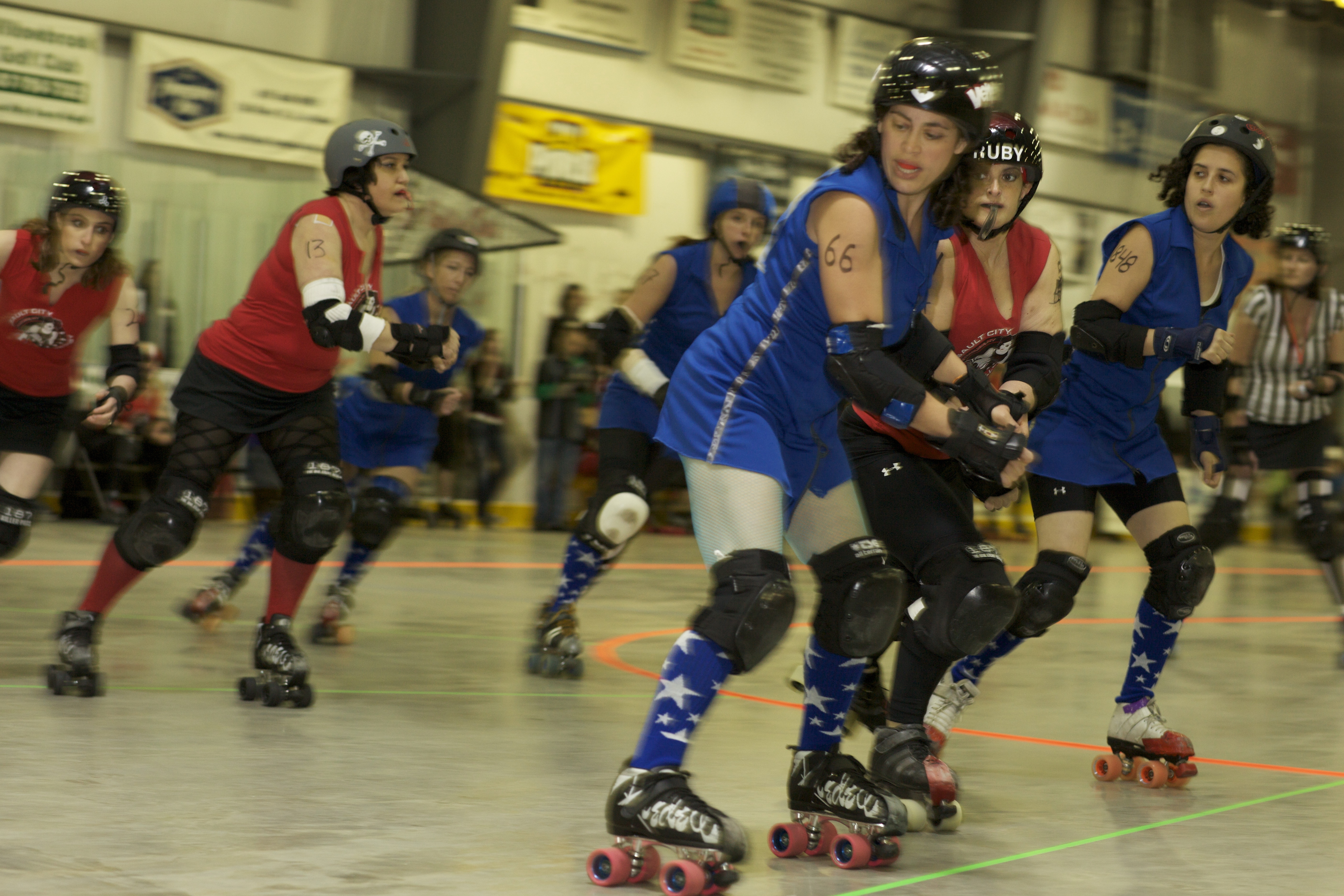
The BlueStockings take on Assault City Roller Derby April 17, 2010

Ithaca Roller Derby is a women's flat-track roller derby league based in Ithaca, New York. Founded in the fall of 2007, IRD is a member of the Women's Flat Track Derby Association (WFTDA).

== History and organization ==
Initially known as the Ithaca League of Women Rollers, it was founded by the creation of the league's flagship team, the SufferJets. Named for local area ties to the women's suffrage movement and the 1848 Woman's Rights Convention in Seneca Falls, IRD held its first home bout at Cass Park Rink in May 2008. The league experienced steady growth and formed a second team, the BlueStockings, in 2010.

IRD became a WFTDA Apprentice league in January 2011. In September 2011 they became a full member league of the Women's Flat Track Derby Association.

IRD is now composed of two teams; the SufferJets serve as the league's A team and travel team in WFTDA-sanctioned play, and the BlueStockings are a B team which also competes against comparable teams from other leagues more locally. The SufferJets were voted the Ithaca Times Best Local Sports Team in 2010.

== Junior roller derby ==
The league is host to the Ithaca League of Junior Rollers (ILJR). Formed in 2010, the junior team was the first to be formed in the state of New York. The skaters' ages range from 8–17 and are coached by skaters in IRD.

The Ithaca League of Junior Rollers is a recreational (non-ranked) member of the Junior Roller Derby Association, which uses a modified version of WFTDA rules and regulations. The league has two divisions, an open-gender division and a female-only division. The junior rollers had their exhibition bout in September 2010, only one year after the Junior Roller Derby Association was founded in Austin, Texas.

== WFTDA rankings ==
Season	Final ranking	Playoffs	Championship
2012	26 E	DNQ	DNQ
2013	79 WFTDA	DNQ	DNQ
2014	72 WFTDA	DNQ	DNQ
2015	77 WFTDA	DNQ	DNQ
2016	87 WFTDA	DNQ	DNQ
2017	84 WFTDA	DNQ	DNQ
2018	109 WFTDA	DNQ	DNQ
2019	240 WFTDA	DNQ	DNQ
2023	85 NA Northeast	DNQ	DNQ
2024	92 NA Northeast	DNQ	DNQ

- no WFTDA rankings from 2020-2022 due to COVID-19 pandemic
