= Salisbury Roller Girls =

Roller derby league

- Metro area: Salisbury, MD
- Country: United States
- Founded: 2010
- Teams: All-Stars (A team); Wicomikazis (B team)
- Track type(s): Flat
- Venue: Mitchell's Martial Arts
- Affiliations: WFTDA
- Website: salisburyrollergirls.com

The Salisbury Roller Girls (SRG) is a flat track roller derby league based in Salisbury, Maryland. Founded in 2010, the league consists of two teams which compete against teams from other leagues. Salisbury is a member of the Women's Flat Track Derby Association (WFTDA).

== History ==
The league was founded by Eva "Buster Skull" Paxton, who had become a fan of roller derby after hearing about the sport on Miami Ink. She trained with the Diamond State Roller Girls for a year following her eighteenth birthday, but then founded a league in her hometown early in 2010.

Salisbury hosted its first bout in March 2011, an intraleague contest between the Wicomikazis and Old Bay Bombers. The Wicomikazis later became its B team. By 2012, it was playing a full season, which it finished with a 6 to 1 winning record.

Salisbury was accepted as a member of the Women's Flat Track Derby Association Apprentice Program in July 2012, and it became a full Women's Flat Track Derby Association member in September 2013.

== WFTDA rankings ==
Season	Final ranking	Playoffs	Championship
2014	103 WFTDA	DNQ	DNQ
2015	101 WFTDA	DNQ	DNQ
2016	122 WFTDA	DNQ	DNQ
2017	203 WFTDA	DNQ	DNQ
2018	222 WFTDA	DNQ	DNQ
