= Cedar Valley Roller Derby =

Roller derby league

- Metro area: Waterloo, IA
- Country: United States
- Founded: 2010
- Teams: Push-Up Brawlers (A team); B team
- Track type(s): Flat
- Venue: McElroy Auditorium
- Affiliations: WFTDA
- Website: www.cvrollerderby.com

Cedar Valley Roller Derby is a women's flat track roller derby league based in Waterloo, Iowa. Founded in 2010, the league consists of two teams, which compete against teams from other leagues, and is a member of the Women's Flat Track Derby Association (WFTDA).

The league played its first home bout in April 2011, debuting at the McElroy Auditorium to a crowd of 2,300 fans. At that time, the league had around thirty skaters.

The league was accepted as a member of the Women's Flat Track Derby Association Apprentice Programme in July 2012, and became a full member of the WFTDA in June 2013.

Founded as Cedar Valley Derby Divas, the organization announced on its facebook page in 2015 that it was rebranding as Cedar Valley Roller Derby, which it continues under today.

== WFTDA rankings ==
Season	Final ranking	Playoffs	Championship
2014	192 WFTDA	DNQ	DNQ
2015	220 WFTDA	DNQ	DNQ
2016	154 WFTDA	DNQ	DNQ
2017	173 WFTDA	DNQ	DNQ
