= Northside Rollers =

Roller derby league

- Metro area: Melbourne
- Country: Australia
- Founded: 2010
- Teams: Death Stars (A team); Rebel Alliance (B team); Pulp Vixens (Home Team); Sisters of Anarchy (Home Team)
- Track type(s): Flat
- Venue: Darebin Community Sports Stadium
- Affiliations: WFTDA
- Website: www.northsiderollers.com

The Northside Rollers (NSR), sometimes known as the Melbourne Northside Rollers, is a women's flat track roller derby league based in Melbourne, Australia. Founded in 2010, the league consists of two home teams, plus two travel teams which compete against teams from other leagues.

The league originated in May 2010 as a social skating group, its members officially forming the "Northside Rollers" in November. By April 2011, it had sixteen full members, and it played its first bout later in the year, against LaTrobe City Roller Derby. By mid-2013, it had grown further, to encompass a total of four teams.

In October 2013, Northside was accepted as a member of the Women's Flat Track Derby Association Apprentice Programme, and graduated to full membership in December 2014.

In November 2013, Northside's A Team, the Death Stars, placed fourth in the VIC/TAS tournament.
