= Ann Arbor Roller Derby =

Roller derby league

- Metro area: Ann Arbor, MI
- Country: United States
- Founded: 2010
- Teams: A2RD Travel Team (A team)(B team); All League Team
- Track type: Flat
- Venue: Buhr Park Arena, Ann Arbor
- Affiliations: WFTDA
- Website: https://a2rollerderby.com

Ann Arbor Roller Derby (A2RD) is a women's flat track roller derby league based in Ann Arbor, Michigan. Founded in 2010, the league consists of two travel teams, A2RD Travel Team, which competes against teams from other leagues, as well as a home "All League" team. Ann Arbor is a member of the Women's Flat Track Derby Association (WFTDA).

== History ==
The league was started in May 2010 by Kellee Gallardo and Milinda Villegas, with an open meeting in Ann Arbor, and held other recruitments during the year. By 2011 the league was being led by a board of directors and was coached by J.T. Slyde, who had helped train Elliot Page and Drew Barrymore for their roles in the roller derby film Whip It, when it filmed in Detroit and Ypsilanti. When formed, the league featured two home teams, the Tree Town Thrashers and the Huron River Rollers, and also their travel team, the A2D2 Brawlstars, before evolving to the present team structure. The A2D2 Brawlstars played their first bout ever on June 11, 2011, losing to the Floral City All-Stars of Monroe, and hosted their first public bout on September 17, 2011, at Buhr Park Arena, a 131–96 loss to Flint City Derby Girls from Flint.

== WFTDA competition ==
The Ann Arbor Derby Dimes are a member of the Women's Flat Track Derby Association (WFTDA), having been first accepted in the WFTDA's Apprentice Program in July 2012, and graduating to full membership in December 2013. As of June 2015, the Ann Arbor Derby Dimes were ranked 64th in the world by the WFTDA, and a member of the WFTDA Division 3. In 2015, Ann Arbor barely missed the cutoff for WFTDA Division 2 Playoffs, and then made their WFTDA Playoff debut at the WFTDA Division 1 level in 2016. That year Ann Arbor entered the tournament in Columbia as the 9th seed, and finished in 10th place. Ann Arbor returned to Division 1 Playoffs in 2017 at Seattle, Washington, but lost to Tampa Bay Derby 280-99 and 255–105 to 2×4 Roller Derby to finish out of the medals. In 2018 at the WFTDA Playoff in Atlanta, Ann Arbor finished out of the medals, but ended their weekend with their first victory at WFTDA Playoffs in the consolation round, 213–185 over Windy City Rollers.

=== Rankings ===
Season	Final ranking	Playoffs	Championship
2014	86 WFTDA	DNQ	DNQ
2015	56 WFTDA	DNQ	DNQ
2016	32 WFTDA	10 D1	DNQ
2017	38 WFTDA	CR D1	DNQ
2018	25 WFTDA	CR	DNQ
2019	28 WFTDA	CR	DNQ

- CR = consolation round
