= Lilac City Roller Derby =

Flat-track roller derby league based in Spokane, Washington

- Metro area: Spokane, WA
- Country: United States
- Founded: 2006
- Teams: Sass (A team - women); Abominations (men's team)
- Track type(s): Flat
- Venue: Pattison's North Roller Rink
- Affiliations: WFTDA MRDA
- Org. type: 501c3
- Website: www.lilaccityrollerderby.com

Lilac City Roller Derby is a flat track roller derby league based in Spokane, Washington. Founded in 2006, the league consists of a women's team, an affiliated men's team, and a supported junior roller derby team. Lilac City is a member of the Women's Flat Track Derby Association (WFTDA).

== History and organization ==
Lilac City was founded by Stacie Ellis in 2006, the first flat-track roller derby league in the city, and began competing with leagues from across the northwest in its second season. The league was accepted into the Women's Flat Track Derby Association Apprentice Program in July 2010, and became a full member of the WFTDA in March 2012.

In 2013 Lilac City Roller Girls relocated their practice facility to a rented warehouse in Airway Heights, and began holding their bouts at the Spokane Fairgrounds, and the Spokane Convention Center for larger events. That year Lilac City added Spokane's first all-male roller derby team, the River City Wreckers as well as a new coed team, the Quad Forsaken.

In 2017, following a reorganization, the Lilac City Roller Girls became Lilac City Roller Derby. Their all-women's team dropped the gap-toothed princess and re-branded as the Spokane Sass. The league includes a Men's Roller Derby Association (MRDA) apprentice Sass men's team, the Abominations, and a new Sass junior team, the Wendigo.

== WFTDA rankings ==
former league logo

Lilac City became a WFTDA member in 2012. As of January 2020, they are ranked #206 in the Women's Flat Track Derby Association Rankings compiled by the WFTDA.

== In the community ==
In 2011, the league cleaned up a space underneath Interstate 90 to use for practice.
