= West Coast Derby Knockouts =

Roller derby league

- Metro area: Ventura, CA
- Country: United States
- Founded: 2008
- Teams: TKO's (A team); Uppercuts (B team)
- Track type(s): Flat
- Venue: Skating Plus
- Affiliations: WFTDA
- Website: westcoastderbyknockouts.com

The West Coast Derby Knockouts (WCDK) is a women's flat track roller derby league based in Ventura, California. Founded in 2008, the league consists of two teams, which compete against teams from other leagues. West Coast is a member of the Women's Flat Track Derby Association (WFTDA).

== History ==
The league grew from only 12 skaters in 2009, and by 2013 it was raising money for a local children's charity, in addition to teaching local children to skate. The founders of the local Sugartown Rollergirls banked track league originally skated with West Coast.

The league was accepted as a member of the WFTDA Apprentice Program in January 2012, and became a full member of the WFTDA in June 2013.

The West Coast Junior Knockouts are the league's junior roller derby program. This is made up of three teams: the TKOs, The Uppercuts and the Contenders as well as the Sluggers development squad.

== WFTDA rankings ==
Season	Final ranking	Playoffs	Championship
2014	178 WFTDA	DNQ	DNQ
2015	224 WFTDA	DNQ	DNQ
2016	192 WFTDA	DNQ	DNQ
