= Hartford Area Roller Derby =

Roller derby league

- Metro area: Hartford, Connecticut
- Country: United States
- Founded: 2011
- Teams: Hartford Wailers (A team); Hartford Banshees (B team)
- Track type: Flat
- Venue: Ron A Roll Skating Rink (Vernon, CT)
- Affiliations: WFTDA
- Org. type: Non Profit Organization
- Website: hartfordarearollerderby.com

Hartford Area Roller Derby or H.A.R.D., is a women's flat-track roller derby league based in the Hartford, Connecticut area. Founded in 2011, the league is a member of the Women's Flat Track Derby Association (WFTDA).

== History and structure ==
Hartford Area Roller Derby was founded as the third modern-day roller derby league in Connecticut in 2011 by Danielle "Diesel N’ Gin" Paine, who had previously played roller derby with Pioneer Valley Roller Derby and Central Mass Roller Derby. H.A.R.D. held its first public games in May 2012 at Nomads Adventure Quest in South Windsor, and now play where they practice at Ron A Roll Skating Rink in Vernon, CT. By July 2012 H.A.R.D. was drawing hundreds of fans to its home games.

In January 2013 H.A.R.D. became a member of the Women's Flat Track Derby Association (WFTDA) Apprentice Program, graduating to full membership in the WFTDA in December of the same year. In January 2016 H.A.R.D. was granted 501 (3)(c) status.

Switching to a flat track from the traditional banked track makes the sport more accessible to new players as the skill needed is reduced, intended to grow the game buy lowering barriers to entry for those approaching the sport for the first time.

H.A.R.D. is represented at the WFTDA level by their A team, the Hartford Wailers, named after the former local National Hockey League team, and the league's B team is the Hartford Banshees (formerly known as the Beat City Bedrockers). League members pay dues towards membership, with new members partaking in a "fresh meat" training program.

== WFTDA rankings ==
Even though H.A.R.D. gained WFTDA membership in December 2013, they did not earn their first WFTDA ranking until 2015, debuting at #200 overall.

Season	Final ranking	Playoffs	Championship
2014	unranked	DNQ	DNQ
2015	190 WFTDA	DNQ	DNQ
2016	197 WFTDA	DNQ	DNQ
2017	234 WFTDA	DNQ	DNQ

== In the community ==
As a non-profit organization, Hartford Area Roller Derby holds regular community fundraising events and offers an annual scholarship to graduating high-school seniors. H.A.R.D. is dedicated to building roller skating skills, creating a local roller derby community, establishing positive relationships within the community, and promoting teamwork, respect, and empowerment of women and nonbinary individuals. Some charitable efforts include an annual "Polar Run and Pub Crawl" from 2013–2019 to benefit the local women's shelters Interval House in Hartford and Prudence Crandall Center in New Britain. H.A.R.D. has also designated the Prudence Crandall Center as its beneficiary should the league ever need to dissolve. Members of H.A.R.D. also took part in fundraising scrimmages in 2013 to benefit the Sandy Hook School Fund. H.A.R.D has participated in Red Cross blood drives, "Rebuilding Together - Manchester" events, Ellington's 1st Annual PRIDE, among other things.
