= Eves of Destruction =

Roller derby league

- Metro area: Victoria, BC
- Country: Canada
- Founded: 2006
- Teams: Envy (A-team); Encore (B team); Belles of the Brawl; Margarita Villains; Daisy Pushers; Hard Cores; Rotten Apples (junior); Seeds of Destruction
- Track type: Flat
- Venue: Various
- Affiliations: WFTDA
- Org. type: NPO
- Website: evesofdestructionrollerderby.com

Eves of Destruction is a women's flat track roller derby league in Victoria, British Columbia. The league is organized as a non-profit organization. Eves of Destruction is a member of the Women's Flat Track Derby Association (WFTDA).

== History ==
Established in 2006 as Dead City Rollergirls, the league was the first women's flat track league in British Columbia. Eves of Destruction was founded on the motto of "By the Skaters, For the Skaters" and is a dedicated skater-run organization. Members compete in a yearly season at home, and also travel to other cities in Canada and previously the US to play competitive flat track roller derby.

Eves of Destruction joined the WFTDA Apprentice Program in October 2016 and became a full member league in January 2018. In 2025, the Eves of Destruction added a second WFTDA ranked team to the league.

The Eves of Destruction rebranded their logo from a pin-up skater in an apple to the updated logo in August, 2023.

== Organization ==
The Eves of Destruction consist of 7 competitive teams in addition to a learn to skate program for juniors under 10 years old called the Seeds of Destruction and both a Learn to Skate program and a Learn to Derby program for adults over 18.

The charter program consists of two competitive WFTDA ranked teams: Envy(A-team) and Encore(B-team).

There are three house teams that compete for the "Calamity Cup" every year within their own bracket: the Margarita Villains and the Belles of the Brawl originated in 2009 while the Daisy Pushers were created in 2019 to allow for league expansion.

The Hardcores are a B/C level team for transfer skaters new to the league, aged out juniors, and skaters after they graduate the Learn to Derby program. Skaters are drafted from The Hardcores to a house team.

The Rotten Apples are the junior team(ages 10-18) consisting of all levels of play from rookies to Junior Team Canada level skaters.

All 7 teams travel for games throughout Canada and previously the USA while also hosting games in Victoria.

== WFTDA rankings ==
Season	Final ranking	Playoffs	Championship
2018	182 WFTDA	DNQ	DNQ
