= Gothenburg Roller Derby =

Roller derby league

- Metro area: Gothenburg
- Country: Sweden
- Founded: 2009
- Track type(s): Flat
- Venue: Lindholmens Sporthallar
- Affiliations: WFTDA
- Website: www.gbgrollerderby.se

Gothenburg Roller Derby (GBGRD) is a women's flat-track roller derby league based in Gothenburg Sweden. Founded in 2009, the league consists of one travel team- Aqwarriors - and close to 100 members, and is a member of the Women's Flat Track Derby Association (WFTDA).

== History ==
The league was founded in 2009. In July 2013, it hosted the roller derby section of the SM-veckan national sporting competition, taking fourth place in the Swedish championships.

In April 2013, Gothenburg was accepted as a member of the Women's Flat Track Derby Association Apprentice Program. Gothenburg became a full member of the WFTDA in March 2015.

In July 2014, GBGRD again reached the semifinals in the Swedish championships in roller derby.
