= Star City Roller Girls =

Roller derby league

- Metro area: Roanoke, VA
- Country: United States
- Founded: 2006
- Track type: Flat
- Affiliations: WFTDA
- Website: starcityrollergirls.wordpress.com

The Star City Roller Girls was a roller derby league based in Roanoke, Virginia. Founded in 2006, the league consists of one team which competes against teams from other leagues. SCRG was accepted as a member of the Women's Flat Track Derby Association Apprentice Program in 2011.
