= Radioactive City RollerGirls =

American roller derby league

- Metro area: Paducah, KY
- Country: United States
- Founded: 2007
- Dissolved: 2012
- Track type: Flat
- Affiliations: WFTDA
- Website: radioactiverg.com

The Radioactive City RollerGirls (RCRG) was a roller derby league based in Paducah, Kentucky. Founded in 2007, the league consisted of a single team, which competed against teams from other leagues.

By 2010, the league was attracting crowds of around three hundred fans to its regular bouts. In April 2011, it was accepted as a member of the Women's Flat Track Derby Association Apprentice Program.

In 2012, Radioactive City lost its practice space at the Julian Carroll Convention Center, after its rates were greatly increased, and had to temporarily hold practices at an outdoor skate park. The league is no longer active.
