= List of Michigan sport championships =

The following are Michigan's professional sports league champions, NCAA Division I basketball, football and hockey champions, and NCAA Division II football champions:

- 1887 The Detroit Wolverines win the National League baseball pennant and defeat the American Association's St. Louis Browns in the World Series with a score of 17-3.
- 1895 The Page Fence Giants, based in Adrian, are the Western Negro baseball league champions.
- 1896 The Page Fence Giants, based in Adrian, win the Negro World Series.
- 1897 The Page Fence Giants, based in Adrian, are the Western Negro baseball league champions.
- 1898 The Page Fence Giants, based in Adrian, claim the Western Negro baseball league championship.
- 1932 The Detroit Wolves are the Negro East-West League champions.
- 1935 The Detroit Tigers win their first World Series.
- 1935 The Detroit Lions win their first National Football League championship.
- 1936 The Detroit Red Wings win their first Stanley Cup.
- 1937 The Detroit Red Wings win their second Stanley Cup.
- 1941 The Detroit Eagles basketball team wins the World Professional Tournament in Chicago.
- 1943 The Detroit Red Wings win their third Stanley Cup.
- 1945 The Detroit Tigers win their second World Series.
- 1946 The Detroit Auto Club of the International Hockey League win the first Joseph Turner Memorial Cup IHL championship.
- 1947 The Grand Rapids Chicks are the All-American Girls Professional Baseball League Play-Off Champions.
- 1948 The University of Michigan Wolverines win their first NCAA Division I hockey title.
- 1950 The Detroit Red Wings win their fourth Stanley Cup.
- 1951 The University of Michigan Wolverines win their second NCAA hockey title.
- 1952 The Detroit Red Wings win their fifth Stanley Cup.
- 1952 The Detroit Lions win their second National Football League championship.
- 1952 The University of Michigan Wolverines win their third NCAA hockey title.
- 1953 The Grand Rapids Chicks are the All-American Girls Professional Baseball League Play-Off Champions for the second time.
- 1953 The Detroit Lions win their third National Football League championship.
- 1953 The University of Michigan Wolverines win their fourth NCAA hockey title.
- 1954 The Detroit Red Wings win their sixth Stanley Cup.
- 1954 The Kalamazoo Lassies are the last All-American Girls Professional Baseball League Play-Off Champions.
- 1955 The Detroit Red Wings win their seventh Stanley Cup. (They would not win another for 42 years.)
- 1955 The University of Michigan Wolverines win their fifth NCAA hockey title.
- 1956 The Detroit Stars win the Negro American League pennant.
- 1956 The University of Michigan Wolverines win their sixth NCAA hockey title in nine years.
- 1957 The Detroit Lions win their fourth National Football League championship.
- 1962 The Muskegon Zephyrs of the International Hockey League win Muskegon's first Joseph Turner Memorial Cup IHL championship.
- 1962 The Michigan Technological University Huskies win their first NCAA hockey title.
- 1964 The Grand Rapids Tackers win the Mid-West Professional Basketball League championship.
- 1964 The University of Michigan Wolverines win their seventh NCAA hockey title (their last for 32 years).
- 1965 The Grand Rapids Tackers win their first North American Basketball League championship.
- 1965 The Michigan Tech Huskies win their second NCAA hockey title.
- 1966 The Port Huron Flags of the International Hockey League win Port Huron's first Joseph Turner Memorial Cup IHL championship.
- 1966 The Michigan State University Spartans win their first NCAA hockey title.
- 1968 The Grand Rapids Tackers win their second North American Basketball League championship.
- 1968 The Muskegon Mohawks of the International Hockey League win Muskegon's second Joseph Turner Memorial Cup IHL championship.
- 1968 The Detroit Tigers win the World Series for the third time.
- 1971 The Port Huron Flags of the International Hockey League win Port Huron's second Joseph Turner Memorial Cup IHL championship.
- 1972 The Port Huron Wings of the International Hockey League win Port Huron's third and final Joseph Turner Memorial Cup IHL championship.
- 1974 The Central Michigan University Chippewas win the NCAA Division II Football Championship.
- 1975 The Northern Michigan University Wildcats win their first NCAA Division II Football Championship.
- 1975 The Michigan Tech Huskies win their third NCAA hockey title.
- 1977 The Grand Rapids Blades win the United States Hockey League championship in their only season of play.
- 1977 The Saginaw Gears of the International Hockey League win their first Joseph Turner Memorial Cup IHL championship.
- 1977 The Detroit Caesars win their first American Professional Slow Pitch League world series.
- 1978 The Detroit Caesars win their second and last American Professional Slow Pitch League world series.
- 1979 The Michigan State University Spartans become the first college in the state to win the NCAA Men's Division I Basketball Championship.
- 1979 The Kalamazoo Wings win their first Joseph Turner Memorial Cup IHL Championship.
- 1980 The Kalamazoo Wings win their second and final Joseph Turner Memorial Cup IHL Championship.
- 1981 The Saginaw Gears of the International Hockey League win their second and final Joseph Turner Memorial Cup IHL championship.
- 1983 The Detroit Spirits win the Continental Basketball Association championship series.
- 1983 The Michigan Panthers win the first United States Football League championship.
- 1984 The Flint Generals win their only Joseph Turner Memorial Cup IHL Championship.
- 1984 The Detroit Tigers win the World Series for the fourth time.
- 1986 The Muskegon Lumberjacks of the International Hockey League win Muskegon's third Joseph Turner Memorial Cup IHL championship.
- 1986 The Michigan State University Spartans win their second NCAA hockey title.
- 1987 The Grand Rapids Pacers win the National Wheelchair Basketball Association championship.
- 1988 The Arena Football League Detroit Drive win ArenaBowl II and their first ArenaBowl championship.
- 1988 The Lake Superior State University Lakers win their first NCAA hockey title.
- 1989 The University of Michigan Wolverines win their first NCAA Men's Division I Basketball Championship.
- 1989 The Muskegon Lumberjacks of the International Hockey League win Muskegon's fourth and final Joseph Turner Memorial Cup IHL championship.
- 1989 The Detroit Pistons win their first NBA Championship.
- 1989 The Arena Football League Detroit Drive win ArenaBowl III and their second ArenaBowl championship.
- 1990 The Detroit Pistons win their second NBA Championship.
- 1990 The Arena Football League Detroit Drive win ArenaBowl IV and their third ArenaBowl championship.
- 1991 The Detroit Turbos win the National Lacrosse League championship (indoor lacrosse).
- 1991 The Northern Michigan University Wildcats win their first NCAA hockey title.
- 1992 The Detroit Rockers win the National Professional Soccer League championship (indoor soccer).
- 1992 The Arena Football League Detroit Drive win ArenaBowl VI and their fourth and final ArenaBowl championship.
- 1992 The Lake Superior State University Lakers win their second NCAA hockey title.
- 1994 The Albion College Britons win the NCAA Division III Football Championship.
- 1994 The Lake Superior State University Lakers win their third NCAA hockey title.
- 1995 The Detroit Junior Red Wings win the Ontario Hockey League Championship Series and receive the J. Ross Robertson Cup.
- 1996 The Class A Minor League West Michigan Whitecaps (Grand Rapids) win their first Midwest League Championship Series.
- 1996 The Flint Generals of the Colonial Hockey League win their first Colonial Cup.
- 1996 The University of Michigan Wolverines win their eighth NCAA hockey title.
- 1997 The Detroit Red Wings bring home the Stanley Cup after a 42-year drought dating back to 1955.
- 1997 The Detroit Vipers of the International Hockey League win their only Joseph Turner Memorial Cup IHL championship. It marked the first time two professional hockey teams from the same metropolitan area won championships in the same year.
- 1997 The Class A Minor League Lansing Lugnuts win their first Midwest League Championship Series.
- 1997 The University of Michigan Wolverines win the NCAA Division I-A football title.
- 1998 The Detroit Red Wings claim their ninth Stanley Cup.
- 1998 The Class A Minor League West Michigan Whitecaps (Grand Rapids) win their second Midwest League Championship Series.
- 1998 The University of Michigan Wolverines win their ninth NCAA hockey title.
- 1999 The Muskegon Fury of the United Hockey League with their first Colonial Cup.
- 2000 The Michigan State University Spartans win their second NCAA Men's Division I Basketball Championship.
- 2000 The Flint Generals of the United Hockey League win their second Colonial Cup.
- 2000 The Class A Minor League Michigan Battle Cats (Battle Creek) win their first Midwest League Championship Series.
- 2001 The Detroit Dogs are the American Basketball Association (ABA 2000) champions.
- 2001 The Arena Football League Grand Rapids Rampage win ArenaBowl XV and their first ArenaBowl championship.
- 2002 The Muskegon Fury of the United Hockey League with their second Colonial Cup.
- 2002 The Detroit Red Wings win their tenth Stanley Cup.
- 2002 The Detroit Demolition (known as the Detroit Danger at the time) win their first National Women's Football Association (NWFA) championship.
- 2002 The Grand Valley State University Lakers win their first NCAA Division II Football Championship.
- 2003 The Detroit Shock win their first WNBA Championship in the WNBA Finals.
- 2003 The Class A Minor League Lansing Lugnuts win their second Midwest League Championship Series.
- 2003 The Detroit Demolition win their second NWFA Championship.
- 2003 The Grand Valley State University Lakers win their second NCAA Division II Football Championship.
- 2004 The Muskegon Fury of the United Hockey League skate to their third Colonial Cup league championship.
- 2004 The Detroit Pistons win their third NBA Championship.
- 2004 The Class A Minor League West Michigan Whitecaps (Grand Rapids) win their third Midwest League Championship Series.
- 2004 The Detroit Demolition win their third NWFA Championship.
- 2005 The Muskegon Fury of the United Hockey League win their fourth Colonial Cup.
- 2005 The Kalamazoo Kings achieve their first League Championship in the independent professional baseball Frontier League.
- 2005 The Detroit Demolition win their fourth NWFA Championship.
- 2005 The Grand Valley State University Lakers win their third NCAA Division II Football Championship.
- 2006 The Kalamazoo Wings of the United Hockey League earn their first Colonial Cup.
- 2006 The Port Huron Pirates win their first Great Lakes Indoor Football League championship.
- 2006 The Detroit Shock win their second WNBA Championship in the WNBA Finals.
- 2006 The West Michigan Whitecaps from Grand Rapids prevail in the Midwest League Championship Series for the fourth time.
- 2006 The Grand Valley State University Lakers claim their fourth NCAA Division II Football Championship in five years.
- 2007 The West Michigan Whitecaps from Grand Rapids win their fifth Midwest League Championship Series in twelve seasons.
- 2007 The Michigan State University Spartans win their third NCAA hockey title.
- 2008 The Detroit Red Wings win the Stanley Cup—their eleventh National Hockey League championship and fourth in eleven seasons.
- 2008 The Detroit Shock earn their third WNBA Championship in the WNBA Finals. It is the team's third title in six seasons.
- 2013 The Grand Rapids Griffins win their first American Hockey League(AHL) Calder Cup Championship
- 2015 The West Michigan Whitecaps win their sixth Midwest League Championship Series.
- 2017 The Grand Rapids Griffins win their second American Hockey League(AHL) Calder Cup Championship
- 2021 The Ferris State Bulldogs win their first NCAA Division II Football Championship.
- 2022 The Ferris State Bulldogs win their second NCAA Division II Football Championship.
- 2023 The University of Michigan Wolverines win the College Football Playoff National Championship
- 2025 The Western Michigan Broncos won their first NCAA Div 1 Hockey National Championship

The following are other Michigan sports team champions:

- 1902 The University of Michigan Wolverines win the first Rose Bowl (game).
- 1983 The Livonia United premier soccer team wins MSYSA premier championship.
- 1996 Michigan Madness win USISL Midwest division regular season championship.
- 1997 The Michigan Wolverines won a share of the NCAA Division I-A National Football Championship; Shared with Nebraska
- 2006 The Michigan Bucks win their first USL Premier Development League championship.
- 2019 The Traverse City Pit Spitters win their first Northwoods League championship in their first season.
- 2021 The Traverse City Pit Spitters win their second Northwoods League championship
- 2024 The Saginaw Spirit become only the 3rd US team to ever win the Memorial Cup in Hockey.
