= Greenville Derby Dames =

Roller derby league

- Metro area: Greenville, SC
- Country: United States
- Founded: 2008
- Teams: Allstars (A team); Bad News Babes (B team)
- Track type(s): Flat
- Venue: The Pavilion
- Affiliations: WFTDA
- Website: www.greenvillederbydames.com

The Greenville Derby Dames (GDD) is a women's flat track roller derby league based in Greenville, South Carolina. Founded in 2008, Greenville is a member of the Women's Flat Track Derby Association (WFTDA).

== History and structure ==
Founded in November 2008, the league's skaters come from a wide variety of backgrounds. Greenville has competed in a number of tournaments, and hosts its own "'Twas the Fight before Christmas" tournament each December. The league consists of two teams, which compete against teams from other leagues.

The league was accepted as a member of the Women's Flat Track Derby Association Apprentice Program in July 2012, and became a full member of the WFTDA in June 2013.

== WFTDA rankings ==
Season	Final ranking	Playoffs	Championship
2013	142 WFTDA	DNQ	DNQ
2014	207 WFTDA	DNQ	DNQ
2015	264 WFTDA	DNQ	DNQ
2016	166 WFTDA	DNQ	DNQ
