= Fox Cities Roller Derby =

Roller derby league

- Metro area: Appleton, WI
- Country: United States
- Founded: 2007
- Teams: All Stars (A team); 920 Honeys (B team)
- Track type(s): Flat
- Venue: Player's Choice
- Affiliations: WFTDA
- Website: www.foxcitiesrollerderby.com

Fox Cities Roller Derby, formerly known as The Fox Cityz Foxz, is a women's flat track roller derby league based in Appleton, Wisconsin. Founded in 2007, the league consists of two travel teams which compete against teams from other leagues. Fox Cities is a member of the Women's Flat Track Derby Association (WFTDA).

== Fox Cities history ==
The league played its first season in 2008. Although all the league's home bouts are currently played in Appleton, it has also hosted bouts in Fond du Lac, Wisconsin.

The league was accepted into the Women's Flat Track Derby Association Apprentice Program in October 2009, and became a full member of the WFTDA in September 2010.

The production team of "Jam City Rollergirls", a roller derby-themed console game, attempted to learn to skate with Fox Cityz.

League founder and president Delonna "Wring Leader" Reed of the Fox Cityz Foxz has stepped down and the league will be continuing on now known as Fox Cities Roller Derby (FCRD). In September 2015, Fox Cities announced on social media that they will be merging with Appleton's other WFTDA-member league, the Paper Valley Roller Girls, and the new organization will continue to operate under the Fox Cities name.

== WFTDA rankings ==
Former Fox Cityz logo

Season	Final ranking	Playoffs	Championship
2011	24 NC	DNQ	DNQ
2012	32 NC	DNQ	DNQ
2013	172 WFTDA	DNQ	DNQ
2014	125 WFTDA	DNQ	DNQ
2015	141 WFTDA	DNQ	DNQ
2016	151 WFTDA	DNQ	DNQ
2017	138 WFTDA	DNQ	DNQ
2018	142 WFTDA	DNQ	DNQ

== Paper Valley Rollergirls ==
Former Paper Valley logo

Paper Valley Rollergirls (PVRG) was a competing roller derby league also based in Appleton. Founded in 2011, the league consisted of two teams which competed against teams from other leagues. PVRG gained a higher profile following the release of Whip It! In addition to Appleton, the league played home bouts out of Green Bay, Wisconsin.

Paper Valley was accepted into the Women's Flat Track Derby Association Apprentice Program in November 2009, and became a full member of the WFTDA in June 2010. In 2012, PVRG won the Women's Rolling Along the River Tournament. The following season, Paper Valley earned a spot in the newly created Division 2 Playoffs, as a seventh seed in the Kalamazoo tournament. PVRG went (2-2), claiming sixth place, and an international rank of 54th.

In September 2015, Paper Valley announced on social media that they would merge with Appleton's other WFTDA-member league, Fox Cities Roller Derby, and the new organization would continue to operate under the Fox Cities name. Paper Valley's final WFTDA ranking was at 111 in April 2015.

=== WFTDA rankings as Paper Valley ===
Season	Final ranking	Playoffs	Championship
2011	19 NC	DNQ	DNQ
2012	18 NC	DNQ	DNQ
2013	54 WFTDA	6 D2	DNQ
2014	90 WFTDA	DNQ	DNQ
