= Salt City Roller Derby =

Roller derby league

- Metro area: Syracuse, NY
- Country: United States
- Founded: 2007
- Teams: A Squad (A team); B Squad (B team)
- Track type: Flat
- Venue: Onondaga Community College SRC Arena
- Affiliations: WFTDA
- Org. type: 501(c)(7)
- Website: saltcityrollerderby.com

Salt City Roller Derby (SCRD) is a women's flat track roller derby league based in Syracuse, New York. Founded in 2007, the league consists of two teams, which compete against teams from other leagues, and is a member of the Women's Flat Track Derby Association (WFTDA).

== History ==
The league was founded by Lishelle Fazzone (known as Baroness Von Brutal) after watching the A&E show Rollergirls.

Originally named Assault City Roller Derby, the league held its first practices in January 2007 at the Reva Rollerdrome in Auburn and played its first bout in February 2008 against the Ithaca League of Women Rollers. A few skaters from Utica began training with the league, and this experience enabled them to found Central New York Roller Derby in late 2007.

By late 2010, the league had about forty-five skaters, of whom about thirty were ready to bout. In July 2011, it was accepted as an apprentice member of the Women's Flat Track Derby Association, and it graduated to full membership of the WFTDA in June 2013.

By the start of the 2016 season, the league had an almost completely new roster and updated logo.

On December 16, 2019, the league rebranded and changed its logo and name to Salt City Roller Derby.

== Rankings ==
=== Rankings ===
Season	Final ranking	Playoffs	Championship
2014	137 WFTDA	DNQ	DNQ
2015	NR WFTDA	DNQ	DNQ
2016	288 WFTDA	DNQ	DNQ
2017	306 WFTDA	DNQ	DNQ
2018	283 WFTDA	DNQ	DNQ
2019	194 WFTDA	DNQ	DNQ
2023	93 NA Northeast	DNQ	DNQ
2024	90 NA Northeast	DNQ	DNQ
2025	112 NA Northeast	DNQ	DNQ

- NR = not ranked
- no rankings from 2020-2022 due to COVID-19 pandemic
