= Anchor City Rollers =

Roller derby league in Halifax, Nova Scotia, Canada

- Metro area: Halifax, Nova Scotia
- Country: Canada
- Founded: 2010
- Teams: Harbour Grudges (A team); Dockyard Brawlers (B team); Black Rock Bandits; Dead Ringers
- Track type(s): Flat
- Venue: Mayflower Curling Club
- Affiliations: WFTDA
- Website: www.anchorcityrollers.ca

Anchor City Rollers is a roller derby league based in Halifax, Nova Scotia, Canada, and a member of the Women's Flat Track Derby Association (WFTDA). It was founded in 2010 as the Halifax Roller Derby Association and changed its name in 2014.

As of late 2018, Anchor City has roughly a hundred players and actively recruits new ones. It was voted second-best sports league by readers of The Coast in 2012 and 2015, and best in 2013, 2014, and 2018. It was nominated for a NS WomenActive Trendsetter Award in 2016.

Anchor City was accepted into the WFTDA Apprentice Program in August 2018 and made a full member in February 2019.
