= Diamond State Roller Derby =

Roller derby league

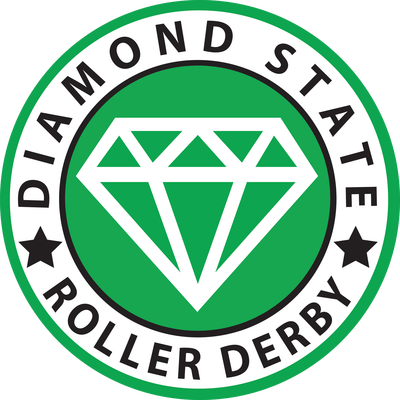
- Metro area: Wilmington, Delaware
- Country: United States
- Founded: 2006
- Teams: All-Stars; Back Alley Brawlers; Black Eyed Bombshells; Hardwood Heartbreakers
- Track type(s): Flat
- Venue: Christiana Skating Center
- Affiliations: WFTDA

Diamond State Roller Derby (DSRD) is a flat track roller derby league based in Wilmington, Delaware. Founded in 2006, the league has since grown to include four teams: one travel team and three home teams. Diamond State is a member of the Women's Flat Track Derby Association (WFTDA).

== History ==
The league was formed in March 2006 as the "Wilmington City Ruff Rollers", by four local women: Naughty Nikki Napalm, WitchBlade, Will O' the Whip, and Lolli Dagger, two of whom had unsuccessfully tried out for a Philadelphia-based league. They soon recruited more skaters, bringing the league up to twenty, and remained around this strength for several years, but the release of the movie Whip It rapidly drew additional interest.

The organization was accepted into the WFTDA Apprentice Program in January 2010, and adopted the name "Diamond State Roller Girls" soon after. It became a full member of the WFTDA in December 2012, becoming eligible to obtain regional ranking. DSRG is the first roller derby league in the state of Delaware to obtain WFTDA membership.

At the beginning of 2012, DSRG underwent an enormous restructuring to make the league more competitive, including a more regimented training program for new skaters, a new board of directors, and new coaching staff. Due to all the changes made, Diamond State Roller Girls had greater growth and skater retention during the 2012 season than all other previous seasons. The three home teams are the Back Alley Brawlers, The Black Eyed Bombshells, and the Hardwood Heartbreakers.

In January 2016, the league changed its name to Diamond State Roller Derby.

In 2020, due to the COVID-19 Pandemic and the closure and restrictions around gatherings in the United States, the WFTDA canceled many of the events scheduled and DSRD has chosen to take time off to comply

== WFTDA rankings ==
| Season | Final ranking | Playoffs | Championship |
|---|---|---|---|
| 2014 | 198 WFTDA | DNQ | DNQ |
| 2015 | 269 WFTDA | DNQ | DNQ |
| 2016 | 311 WFTDA | DNQ | DNQ |
| 2017 | 332 WFTDA | DNQ | DNQ |
| 2018 | 338 WFTDA | DNQ | DNQ |
| 2019 | 342 WFTDA | DNQ | DNQ |
