= Lake City Roller Dolls =

Roller derby league

- Metro area: Warsaw, IN
- Country: United States
- Founded: 2010
- Teams: All-Stars
- Track type(s): Flat
- Venue: Hansen's Eastlake Skate Center
- Affiliations: WFTDA
- Website: www.lcrollerdolls.com

The Lake City Roller Dolls (LCRD) is a roller derby league based in Warsaw, Indiana. Founded in 2010, the league consists of a single team which competes against teams from other leagues, and is a member of the Women's Flat Track Derby Association (WFTDA).

== History ==
The league was founded in February 2010. Although its initial coach left in August to found the rival War City Derby Militia, Lake City continued training, with the twin aims of playing their first season in 2011, and joining the Women's Flat Track Derby Association (WFTDA). The league had a strong focus on raising money for charities.

Lake City was accepted into the WFTDA Apprentice Program in January 2011, and played its first home bout in June.

Lake City completed the WFTDA Apprentice Program in December 2014 led by returning skater and coach Dyrtie Gyrtie, graduating to full member status.
