= Rock and Roller Queens =

- Metro area: Bogotá
- Country: Colombia
- Founded: 2009
- Teams: All-Stars (A Team); Baby Queens (B Team)
- Track type: Flat
- Venue: El Polo
- Affiliations: WFTDA

Rock and Roller Queens (RRQ) is a roller derby league based in Bogotá, Colombia. Founded in 2009, the league consists of two teams, which compete against teams from other leagues. Rock and Roller Queens is a member of the Women's Flat Track Derby Association (WFTDA).

== History ==
The league was founded in December 2009 by María Paola Hernandez, a local graphic designer with experience of roller skating, after she saw the movie Whip It. By late 2011, the league was one of about ten in the country, and the sport was recognised by Colombian Sports Federation.

The league won the first roller derby tournament in Colombia, which was contested by eight teams, in June 2012. In July, it was accepted as the first member of the Women's Flat Track Derby Association Apprentice Programme from South America, and it became a full member of the WFTDA in June 2013.

== WFTDA rankings ==
Season	Final ranking	Playoffs	Championship
2014	141 WFTDA	DNQ	DNQ
2015	151 WFTDA	DNQ	DNQ
2016	174 WFTDA	DNQ	DNQ
2017	141 WFTDA	DNQ	DNQ
2018	341 WFTDA	DNQ	DNQ
2019	NR WFTDA	DNQ	DNQ
2020	NR WFTDA	DNQ	DNQ
2023	10 Latin America	DNQ	DNQ
2024	12 Latin America	DNQ	DNQ

- NR = not ranked
- no rankings 2020-2022 due to COVID-19 pandemic
