= Cajun Rollergirls =

Roller derby league in Louisiana, US

- Metro area: Lafourche, St. Mary, and Terrebonne parishes, Louisiana
- Country: United States
- Founded: 2008
- Teams: Cajun Rollergirls
- Track type: Flat
- Venue: Aggie's Skate Connection, Houma
- Affiliations: WFTDA
- Website: http://cajunrollergirls.com/

Cajun Rollergirls or CRG, is a women's flat-track roller derby league based in Houma, Louisiana. Founded in 2008, Cajun Rollergirls is a member of the Women's Flat Track Derby Association (WFTDA). The team represents Lafourche, St. Mary, and Terrebonne parishes.

As of 2019 the primary home game venue is Aggie's Skate Connection in Houma. Previously home games were played at Warren J. Harang Jr. Municipal Auditorium in Thibodaux.

== History ==
Historical CRG alternate logo

Cajun Rollergirls started in March 2008 with a call out for skaters from Tracie "Olive Torture" Nelton. In August 2008, Cajun Rollergirls made its public debut with a scrimmage at Wheels R Rollin in Schriever, featuring members of Big Easy Rollergirls from New Orleans and Texas Rollergirls from Austin. Big Easy skater Danielle "Lt. Dan" LaFont was an early coach for the league, and by this time Cajun Rollergirls had 16 members.

In December 2008 the league held its first Toys for Tots Bar Hop fundraiser, which became an annual occurrence.

It was also the first year the CRG was invited to participate in San Fermin Nueva Orleans, a Gulf Coast derby tradition. In November 2009 the CRG held its first large venue bout at the Harang Municipal Auditorium and (due to low participation numbers) were only able to play by teaming up with the Pearl River Swamp Dolls.

In March 2013, the Cajun Rollergirls became a full member of the WFTDA.

== WFTDA rankings ==
| Season | Final ranking | Playoffs | Championship |
|---|---|---|---|
| 2014 | 120 WFTDA | DNQ | DNQ |
| 2015 | 201 WFTDA | DNQ | DNQ |
| 2016 | 316 WFTDA | DNQ | DNQ |
| 2017 | 288 WFTDA | DNQ | DNQ |
