= Battle Born Derby Demons =

Roller derby league in Reno, Nevada, US

- Metro area: Reno, NV
- Country: United States
- Founded: 2006
- Track type(s): Flat
- Venue: Rink on the River
- Affiliations: WFTDA
- Website: www.battlebornderbydemons.com

The Battle Born Derby Demons (BBDD) is a roller derby league based in Reno, Nevada. Founded in 2006, the league consists of a single team, which competes against teams from other leagues.

The league was founded in June 2006 by Erinn McCann (known as "Sweet Ruin"), who had previously seen roller derby in Sacramento, California, and initially consisted of seven women. It played its first bout in November, at which it faced skaters from two leagues based in northern California. As of September 2007, it remained undefeated. By 2008, league membership had risen to forty, training four times a week.

In January 2010, the league was accepted into the Women's Flat Track Derby Association Apprentice Program, but it is no longer listed as a member as of February 2013.
