= Harbor City Roller Derby =

Roller derby league

- Metro area: Duluth, MN
- Country: United States
- Founded: 2007
- Teams: Nautikills (A team); Shipwreckers (B team)
- Track type: Flat
- Venue: Various
- Affiliations: WFTDA
- Website: www.harborcityrollerderby.com

Harbor City Roller Derby (HCRD) is a women's flat track roller derby league based in Duluth, Minnesota. Founded in 2007, the league consists of two teams, which compete against teams from other leagues. Harbor City is a member of the Women's Flat Track Derby Association (WFTDA).

== History ==
Harbor City was founded as Harbor City Roller Dames in January 2007 by Melissa LaTour, known as "Ginger Suicide". For a while, it was run by Michael and Mary Utecht, but in October 2009, it became skater-owned. The team hosts skate-a-thon fundraisers to raise money.

Harbor City played its first full season in 2010, and sold out a 1,200-seat venue for one bout. In 2024, the team played a home match at Wessman Arena, on the campus in University of Wisconsin–Superior.

The league was accepted as a member of the Women's Flat Track Derby Association Apprentice Program in October 2011, and became a full member of the WFTDA in June 2013, and debuted in the WFTDA Rankings on March 31, 2014, at 129 overall. In August 2014, Harbor City hosted one of the WFTDA Division 2 playoff tournaments.

== WFTDA rankings ==
Season	Final ranking	Playoffs	Championship
2014	159 WFTDA	DNQ	DNQ
2015	177 WFTDA	DNQ	DNQ
2016	202 WFTDA	DNQ	DNQ
