= Lansing Roller Derby =

Roller derby league

- Metro area: Lansing, Michigan
- Country: United States
- Founded: 2010
- Teams: Mitten Mavens (Black), Broadbarians (Grey), Derby Vixens (Green), Capital Corruption (Purple)
- Track type: Flat
- Venue: Court One Athletic Center, East Lansing, Michigan
- Affiliations: JRDA
- Website: https://lansingrollerderby.com/

Lansing Roller Derby (LRD) is a flat track roller derby league based in Lansing, Michigan. It was formed in 2021 by the merger of two Lansing area leagues, the Lansing Derby Vixens, and East Lansing Roller Derby. The Lansing Derby Vixens were formerly a member of the Women's Flat Track Derby Association (WFTDA).

== History ==
=== Lansing Derby Vixens ===
The Lansing Derby Vixens were founded in April 2010. Julie Cotton Reed (a.k.a. Cotton Fire), a former skater with Demolition City Roller Derby, became the league's first coach, moving to the city as the league was being founded. The league launched a B team at the end of 2011, choosing its name through a vote by fans.

The league was accepted as a member of the Women's Flat Track Derby Association Apprentice Program in July 2012, and became a full member of the WFTDA in June 2013.

Until 2015, the Lansing Derby Vixens played at the Lansing Center. In 2016, Lansing Derby Vixens hosted a WFTDA Division 2 Playoff tournament at the Summit Sports and Ice Complex in Dimondale, leading to recognition as a "Community Champion" by the Greater Lansing Convention and Visitors Bureau for bringing the event and its associated visitors and business to Lansing.

=== East Lansing Roller Derby ===
East Lansing Roller Derby was also founded in 2010, initially practicing at Demonstration Hall at Michigan State University in East Lansing.

=== Merger ===
On December 3, 2021, the Lansing Derby Vixens and East Lansing Roller Derby announced that they would be merging into a single league, to be known as Lansing Roller Derby.

== Junior team ==
LRD includes a junior team, initially founded as the Cap City Wild Childs in 2011, and now known as Lansing Junior Roller Derby.

== WFTDA rankings ==
WFTDA rankings from 2013 to 2019 apply to the Lansing Derby Vixens.

| Season | Final ranking | Playoffs | Championship |
|---|---|---|---|
| 2013 | 115 WFTDA | DNQ | DNQ |
| 2014 | 105 WFTDA | DNQ | DNQ |
| 2015 | 95 WFTDA | DNQ | DNQ |
| 2016 | 126 WFTDA | DNQ | DNQ |
| 2017 | 136 WFTDA | DNQ | DNQ |
| 2018 | 244 WFTDA | DNQ | DNQ |
| 2019 | 231 WFTDA | DNQ | DNQ |
