= Tokyo Roller Girls =

Roller derby league

- Metro area: Tokyo
- Country: Japan
- Founded: 2010
- Teams: Neon Roller Monsters; Yokosuka Sushi Rollers; Yokota Scary Blossoms; Zama Killer Katanas
- Track type: Flat
- Venue: Various
- Affiliations: WFTDA
- Website: www.tokyorollergirls.jp

The Tokyo Roller Girls (Japanese: 東京ローラーガールズ) is a women's flat track roller derby league based in Tokyo, Japan. Founded in 2010, Tokyo is a member of the Women's Flat Track Derby Association (WFTDA).

As of 2020, the league consisted of Neon Roller Monsters, in Tokyo, and Yokosuka Sushi Rollers, in Yokosuka.

== History ==
The league was founded in 2010 by Jennifer and Talia Moretty, an American military family stationed in Japan Yokosuka Naval Base. It grew with the addition of teams located at the Yokota Air Base and Camp Zama, also consisting principally of American service personnel. In 2012, the Tokyo Bomber Girls was founded, a team of mostly Japanese skaters based in the capital city.

In October 2012, Tokyo Roller Girls was accepted as a member of the Women's Flat Track Derby Association Apprentice Programme, and it became a full member of the WFTDA in June 2013.

== WFTDA rankings ==
Season	Final ranking	Playoffs	Championship
2014	208 WFTDA	DNQ	DNQ
2015	257 WFTDA	DNQ	DNQ
2016	318 WFTDA	DNQ	DNQ
2017	276 WFTDA	DNQ	DNQ
