= Cornfed Derby Dames =

Roller derby league in Indiana, US

- Metro area: Muncie, IN
- Country: United States
- Founded: 2010
- Teams: All-Stars (A team); Killer Kernels (B team)
- Track type: Flat
- Venue: Delaware County Fair Grounds Gibson Roller Skating Arena
- Affiliations: WFTDA

The Cornfed Derby Dames (CFDD) is a women's flat track roller derby league based in Muncie, Indiana. Founded in 2010, Cornfed is a member of the Women's Flat Track Derby Association (WFTDA).

== History and structure ==
The league was founded in early 2010, holding initial practices at Muncie Alliance Church before moving to the larger facility at Gibson Roller Skating Arena, and in February 2019, the Delaware County Fairgrounds began hosting home games. By 2012, the league was playing numerous bouts against leagues such as the South Bend Roller Girls, and was reported as having a major impact on the lives of some of its skaters.

Cornfed was accepted as a member of the Women's Flat Track Derby Association Apprentice Program in July 2012, and it became a full WFTDA member in September 2013.

Founded in 2010 as a single team, the Cornfed Derby Dames added their first B-team in January 2016, the Muncie MissFits. The competitive season runs from February through July every year.

== WFTDA competition ==
=== Rankings ===
Season	Final ranking	Playoffs	Championship
2013	NR	DNQ	DNQ
2014	211 WFTDA	DNQ	DNQ
2015	128 WFTDA	DNQ	DNQ
2016	109 WFTDA	DNQ	DNQ
2017	123 WFTDA	DNQ	DNQ
2018	112 WFTDA	DNQ	DNQ
