= Fog City Rollers =

Roller derby league

- Metro area: Saint John, New Brunswick
- Country: Canada
- Founded: 2010
- Teams: Shipyard Sirens (A team); Portside Pirates (B team)
- Track type(s): Flat
- Venue: Stewart Hurley Arena
- Affiliations: WFTDA
- Website: fogcityrollers.com

The Fog City Rollers (FCR) is a roller derby league based in Saint John, New Brunswick. Founded in 2010, the league consists of two teams, which compete against teams from other leagues, and is a member of the Women's Flat Track Derby Association (WFTDA).

== History ==
The league was founded in February 2010 by two women, Darla Derringer and Suzie Skinher. Their initial membership drive was successful, with more than forty women attending the first practice session. These sessions initially took place at the Quispamsis Arena.

In September 2012, Fog City hosted the Roller Derby Association of Canada's first Atlantic Canada Roller Derby Championship, taking second place in tournament, and qualifying for the following year's national championship.

Fog City was accepted as a member of the Women's Flat Track Derby Association Apprentice Program in April 2013. Fog City became a full member of the WFTDA in September 2016.

== WFTDA rankings ==
Season	Final ranking	Playoffs	Championship
2017	243 WFTDA	DNQ	DNQ
2018	240 WFTDA	DNQ	DNQ
