= Ventura County Derby Darlins =

Roller derby league

- Metro area: Camarillo, CA
- Country: United States
- Founded: 2007
- Teams: VenDolls (A team); Battalion of Skates (B team)
- Track type: Flat
- Venue: Freedom Park
- Affiliations: WFTDA
- Website: www.vcderby.com

Ventura County Derby Darlins (VCDD) is a women's flat track roller derby league based in Camarillo, California. Founded in 2007, it consists of two teams that compete against teams from other leagues. It is a member of the Women's Flat Track Derby Association (WFTDA).

== History ==
The Derby Darlins is a non-profit organization and was founded in early 2007. In October, they hosted a seven-team tournament, which led to its annual Battle for the Coast tournament.

The league was accepted as a member of the Women's Flat Track Derby Association Apprentice Program in July 2012, and became a full member of the WFTDA in June 2013.

== WFTDA rankings ==
Season	Final ranking	Playoffs	Championship
2014	158 WFTDA	DNQ	DNQ
2015	166 WFTDA	DNQ	DNQ
2016	201 WFTDA	DNQ	DNQ
