= Rainy City Roller Dolls =

Roller derby league

- Metro area: Centralia, WA
- Country: United States
- Founded: 2007
- Teams: All Stars
- Track type: Flat
- Venue: The Rollerdrome
- Affiliations: WFTDA
- Website: rainycityrollerdolls.com

Rainy City Roller Dolls (RCRD) is a women's flat track roller derby league based in Centralia, Washington. Founded in 2007, the league consists of a single team, which competes against teams from other leagues. Rainy City is a member of the Women's Flat Track Derby Association (WFTDA).

== History ==
The league was founded in September 2007 by thirteen skaters, By October, it was already practicing three times a week.

Since 2008, Rainy City has organized the annual "Knocktoberfest", a four-team tournament. In April 2011, it was accepted as a member of the Women's Flat Track Derby Association Apprentice Program, and, in December 2012, it graduated to full membership.

Starting in May of 2018, Rainy City will host a six team WFTDA sanctioned tournament called "Reign the Pain" at the RollerDrome in Centralia.

== WFTDA rankings ==
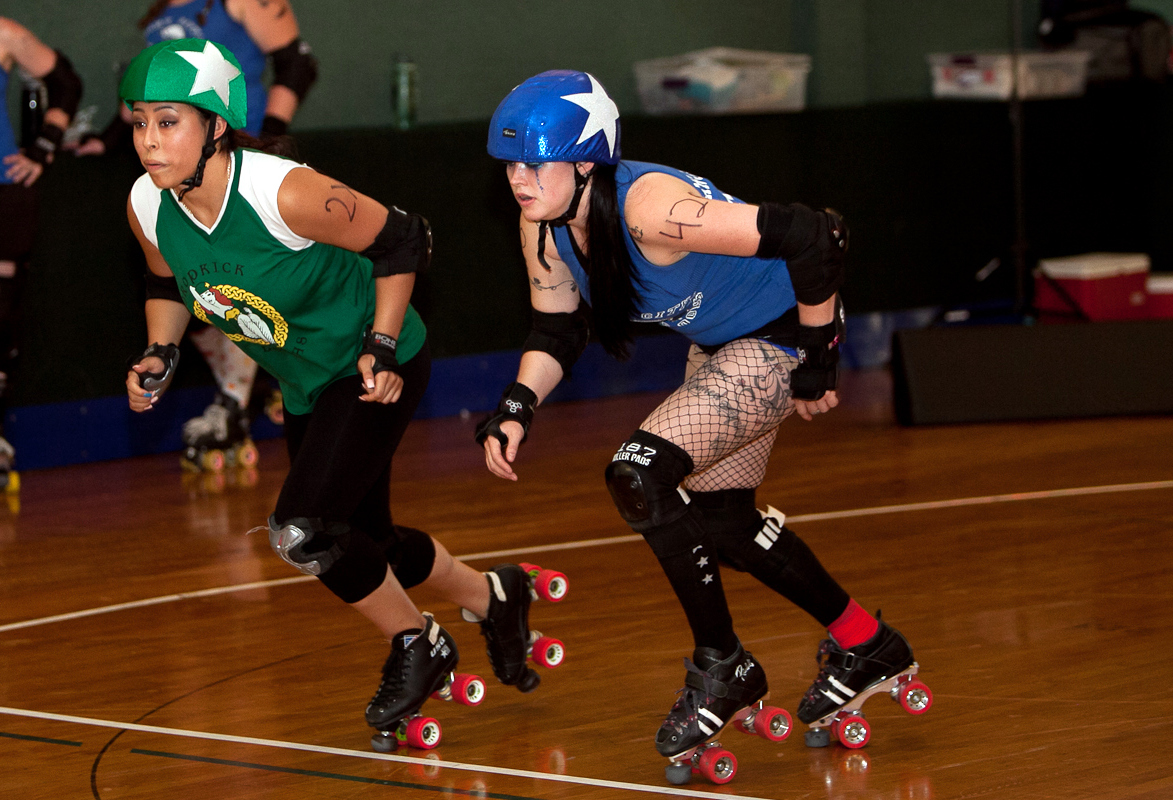
A Rainy City jammer (in blue) faces off against a skater from the Oly Rollers.

Season	Final ranking	Playoffs	Championship
2013	166 WFTDA	DNQ	DNQ
2014	217 WFTDA	DNQ	DNQ
2015	NR	DNQ	DNQ
2016	NR	DNQ	DNQ
2017	313 WFTDA	DNQ	DNQ
2018	309 WFTDA	DNQ	DNQ

- NR = not ranked in this release
