= Black-n-Bluegrass RollerGirls =

US roller derby league

- Metro area: Covington, KY
- Country: United States
- Founded: 2006
- Teams: Black-Outs(A team), Shiners (B team), Black-n-Bluegrass Junior Roller Derby
- Track type: Flat
- Venue: The Bank of Kentucky Center
- Affiliations: WFTDA
- Website: black-n-bluegrass.com

Black-n-Bluegrass Rollergirls (BBRG) is a 501(c)3 women's flat track roller derby league based in Northern Kentucky. Founded in 2006, Black-n-Bluegrass is a member of the Women's Flat Track Derby Association (WFTDA).

== History ==
The league was founded in May 2006, the first flat track league in northern Kentucky. It held its first season in 2008, and, by 2011, the league had more than 40 skaters. By late 2011, the league had expanded its fanbase such that home games were held at the Bank of Kentucky Center.

Black-n-Bluegrass was accepted into the Women's Flat Track Derby Association Apprentice Program in April 2010, and became a full member of the WFTDA in March 2012.

As of 2025, Black-n-Bluegrass holds home games at The Apex, a popular sports and recreation venue in Cincinnati, OH. The league consists of over 30 skaters and rosters two teams, the Black-Outs (A team) and the Shiners (B team) which compete with other teams from other leagues.

The league has a junior roller derby section for skaters under 18 who play by the JRDA ruleset.

== Rankings ==
Season	Final ranking	Playoffs	Championship
2012	27 NC	DNQ	DNQ
2013	153 WFTDA	DNQ	DNQ
2014	212 WFTDA	DNQ	DNQ
2015	271 WFTDA	DNQ	DNQ
2016	220 WFTDA	DNQ	DNQ
2017	286 WFTDA	DNQ	DNQ
