= Flint Roller Derby =

Roller derby league

- Metro area: Flint, MI
- Country: United States
- Founded: 2007
- Teams: Flint City Derby Girls
- Track type(s): Flat
- Venue: Perani Arena
- Affiliations: WFTDA
- Website: www.flintcityderbygirls.org

Flint Roller Derby is a roller derby league based in Flint, Michigan. Founded in 2007 by Kymmburleigh Clark, the league consists of one team which competes against teams from other leagues. Flint is a member of the Women's Flat Track Derby Association (WFTDA).

The league was founded in March 2007. In 2009, it created a roller derby program at the University of Michigan–Flint. For many years, the league played its bouts at the Rollhaven Family Fun Center, but in 2012 it moved to the larger Perani Arena, while continuing to use the Rollhaven venue for scrimmage and practices.

In January 2011, Flint was accepted as a member of the Women's Flat Track Derby Association Apprentice Program, but was no longer listed as a member as of February 2013. By December 2017, the league had rebranded as Flint Roller Derby, and had re-entered the WFTDA Apprentice Program. Flint became a full member league of the WFTDA in September 2018.
