= Roller derby in the United Kingdom =

List of UK teams playing roller derby (contact sport on roller skates)

- Governing body: UKRDA

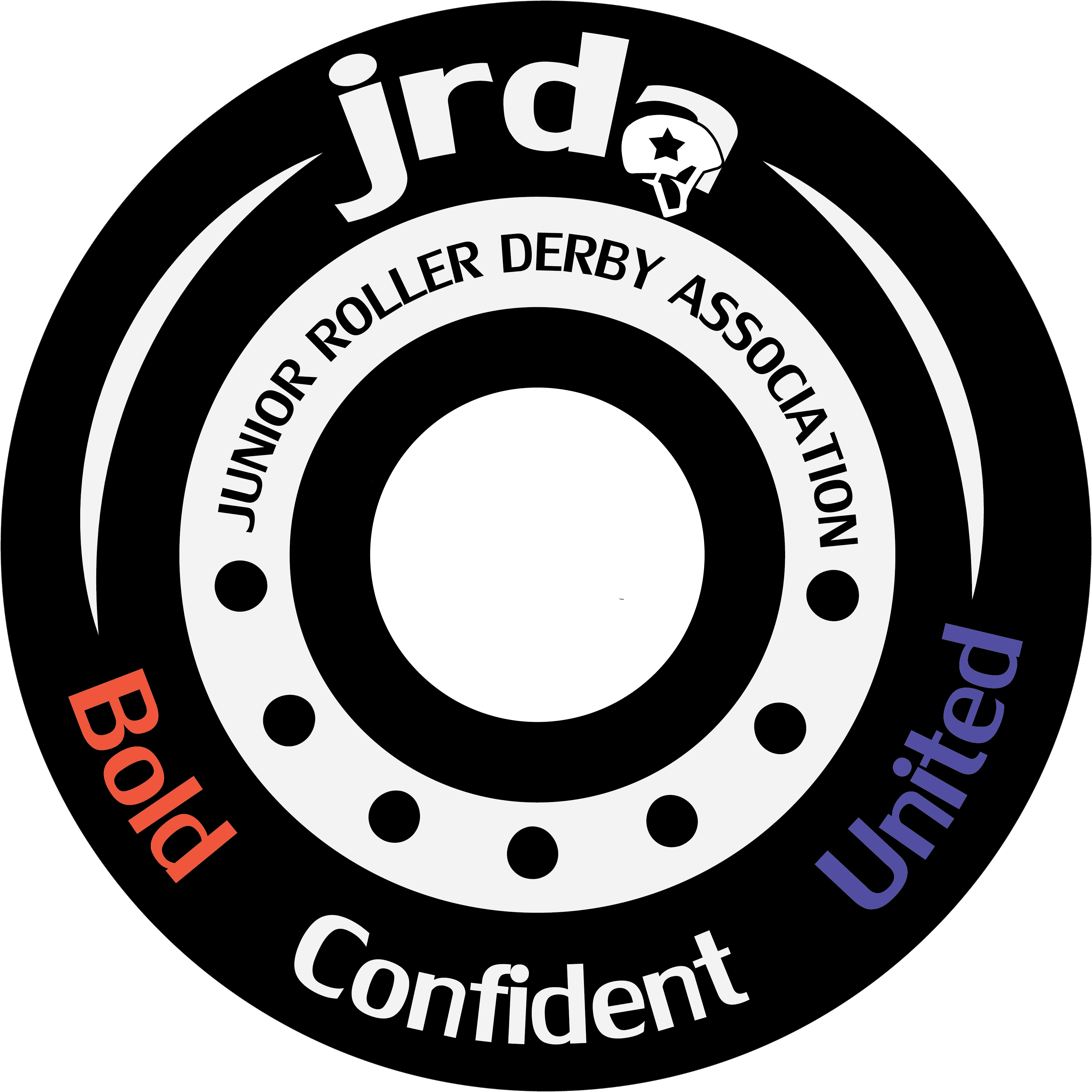
Junior Roller Derby Association logo

By September 2011, there were more than 1,000 amateur roller derby leagues, covering every inhabited continent, with teams in countries such as Canada, Australia, the United Kingdom, New Zealand, Germany, Belgium, Finland, Sweden and Singapore

Contemporary roller derby has a basic set of rules, with variations reflecting the interests of a governing body's member leagues. The Women's Flat Track Derby Association (WFTDA), which is used by the majority of leagues around the world. For example, members of the United Kingdom Roller Derby Association are required to play by WFTDA rules, while members of the Canadian Women's Roller Derby Association are encouraged to join the WFTDA.

== Leagues ==
=== England ===
==== North East ====
- Durham, County Durham – Durham Roller Derby
- Newcastle upon Tyne, Tyne and Wear – Newcastle Roller Derby, Tyne and Fear Roller Derby
- Sunderland, Tyne & Wear – Wearside Roller Derby
- Teesside – Teesside Skate Invaders

==== Yorkshire ====
- Halifax, West Yorkshire – Halifax Bruising Banditas
- Harrogate, North Yorkshire – Spa Town Roller Derby
- Hull, East Yorkshire – Hull's Angels Roller Derby, City of Hull Roller Derby
- Leeds, West Yorkshire – Leeds Roller Derby, Aire Force One
- Middlesbrough, North Yorkshire – Middlesbrough Roller Derby
- Sheffield, South Yorkshire – Sheffield Steel Roller Derby, The Inhuman League, Hallam Hellcats Roller Derby
- Wakefield, West Yorkshire – Wakey Wheeled Cats
- York, North Yorkshire – Haunted City Roller Derby

==== North West ====
- Barrow-in-Furness, Cumbria – Furness Roller Derby
- Blackpool, Lancashire – Blackpool Roller Derby
- Crewe, Cheshire – Railtown Loco Rollers
- Liverpool, Merseyside – Liverpool Roller Birds
- Manchester, Greater Manchester – Rainy City Roller Derby, Manchester Roller Derby, Arcadia Roller Derby
- Preston, Lancashire – Preston Roller Girls
- Wirral, Merseyside – Riverside Rebels Roller Derby, Wirral Roller Derby

==== Midlands ====
- Birmingham, West Midlands – Crash Test Brummies, Birmingham Roller Derby
- Coventry, West Midlands – Coventry Roller Derby
- Grimsby, Lincolnshire – Grimsby Roller Derby
- Hereford, Herefordshire – Hereford Roller Derby
- Leicester, Leicestershire – Roller Derby Leicester, Dolly Rockit Rollers
- Lincoln, Lincolnshire – Lincolnshire Bombers Roller Derby, Lincolnshire Rolling Thunder
- Mansfield, Nottinghamshire – Mansfield Roller Derby
- Nottingham, Nottinghamshire – Hellfire Harlots, Nottingham Roller Derby, East Midlands Open Roller Derby
- Northampton, Northamptonshire – Vendetta Vixens
- Shrewsbury, Shropshire – Evolution Roller Derby
- Stoke-on-Trent, West Midlands – Stoke City Rollers
- Worcester – Worcester Wyldlings Roller Derby
- Wolverhampton, West Midlands – Wolverhampton Honour Rollers

==== East ====
- Bedford, Bedfordshire – Bedfordshire Roller Derby
- Bury St Edmunds, Suffolk – Suffolk Roller Derby
- Cambridge, Cambridgeshire – Cambridge Rollerbillies
- Norwich, Norfolk – Norfolk Roller Derby
- Peterborough, Cambridgeshire – Borderland Brawlers Roller Derby
- Stevenage, Hertfordshire – Full Metal Roller Derby

==== South East ====
- Brighton, East Sussex – Brighton Rockers Roller Derby
- Chelmsford, Essex – Killa Hurtz Roller Derby
- Eastbourne, East Sussex – Eastbourne Roller Derby
- Herne Bay, Kent – Kent Roller Derby
- High Wycombe, Buckinghamshire – Big Bucks High Rollers
- Oxford, Oxfordshire – Oxford Roller Derby, Oxford Wheels of Gory Roller Derby
- Portsmouth, Hampshire – Portsmouth Roller Wenches
- Rochester, Kent – Kent Men's Roller Derby, Apex Predators Roller Derby
- Windsor, Berkshire – Royal Windsor Roller Derby

==== South ====
- Basingstoke, Hampshire – Basingstoke Bullets Roller Derby
- Hemel Hempstead, Hertfordshire – Hertfordshire Roller Derby
- London, Greater London – London Rockin' Rollers, London Roller Derby, Southern Discomfort Roller Derby
- Milton Keynes, Buckinghamshire – Rebellion Roller Derby, Milton Keynes Roller Derby
- Southampton, Hampshire – Southampton City Rollers

==== South West ====
- Bath, Somerset – Bath Roller Derby
- Bideford, Devon – North Devon Roller Derby
- Bristol – Bristol Roller Derby
- Devon and Somerset – South West Angels of Terror (SWAT) Roller Derby
- Exeter, Devon – Exeter Roller Derby
- Dorset – Dorset Roller Derby, Dorset Roller Girls
- Gloucester, Gloucestershire – Severn Roller Torrent
- Guildford – Surrey Roller Girls, Surrey Roller Boys
- Penzance, Cornwall – Cornwall Roller Derby
- Plymouth, Devon – Plymouth City Roller Derby
- Swindon, Wiltshire – Wiltshire Roller Derby

=== Northern Ireland ===
- Belfast – Belfast Roller Derby

=== Scotland ===
- Aberdeen – Granite City Roller Derby, Granite City Brawlers
- Dumfries – Doonhame Roller Derby
- Dundee – Dundee Roller Derby
- Edinburgh – Auld Reekie Roller Derby, Demonburgh Junior Roller Derby
- Elgin – Helgin Roller Derby
- Glasgow – Glasgow Roller Derby, Mean City Roller Derby, Glasgow Men's Roller Derby
- Grangemouth – Bairn City Rollers
- Inverness – Inverness City Roller Derby
- Inverclyde – Inverclyde Roller Derby
- Livingston – New Town Roller Derby
- Lothian – Lothian Derby Dolls, Fear & Lothian
- Orkney – Orkney Roller Derby
- Perth – Fair City Rollers
- Ullapool – Ullapool Slayers

=== Wales ===
- Abercynon – South Wales Silures, Dare Valley Vixens Roller Derby
- Bridgend – Bridgend Roller Derby
- Cardiff – Cardiff Roller Collective, Tiger Bay Brawlers
- Flint – North Wales Roller Derby
- Machynlleth – Mid-Wales Roller Derby
- Neath Port Talbot – NPT Roller Derby
- Newport – Riot City Ravens
- Swansea – Reaper Roller Derby, Swansea City Roller Derby

== Defunct Leagues ==
=== Northern Ireland ===
- Belfast – Belfast City Rockets

== See also ==
- Roller derby
