= Dolly Rockit Rollers =

Roller derby league

Leicestershire Dolly Rockit Rollers
- Metro area: Leicester
- Country: United Kingdom
- Founded: 10 January 2010
- Teams: All-Stars (A); Rockin' Rockets (B)
- Track type: Flat
- Affiliations: WFTDA
- Website: http://www.dollyrockitrollers.co.uk

The Dolly Rockit Rollers (DRR) are a flat track roller derby league based in Leicestershire, England.

Formed in January 2010, they are members of the Women's Flat Track Derby Association (WFTDA), which they joined in July 2014. The league has been a member of the United Kingdom Roller Derby Association (UKRDA) since September 2011.

== League history ==
DRR were formed in January 2010 by skaters Sally-Anne Scrivener (derby name Slamabama) from Birmingham's Central City Rollergirls and Nitro Noush of Rebellion Roller Girls. They were both living in Leicester and travelling to Birmingham and Milton Keynes respectively to play roller derby.

In conjunction with Central City Rollergrils, they organised a practice in the Beaumont Leys area of the city and were encouraged by the high turnout. Leicester has a long affinity with roller skating, with the Granby Halls roller rink widely popular until its closure in 1999, and this provided a solid basis for membership to increase over the following months. The fledgling league was named the Dolly Rockit Rollers, as a pun on the term "rock it" and an homage to Leicester's National Space Centre.

The first bout for DRR was a mixed exhibition game in August 2010, with their first interleague bout (a 79–68 loss to the Newcastle Roller Girls) taking place a month later. This bout also marked the league's debut at their new home, with the Dollies moving from Beaumont Leys to the larger Parklands Leisure Centre at this time. The team would play two more interleague bouts in 2010, winning both of them to finish the year on a 2–1 record.

Skater numbers continued to increase and by May 2011 DRR had enough advanced skaters to form a 'B' team, the Raggy Dollz. The DRR 'B' team made an unofficial debut in May 2011, skating under the name "Free Birds", before playing their first official bout against the Birmingham Blitz Dames’ 'B' team in September of that year. The Dollies were admitted into UKRDA shortly after this bout.

DRR’s All-Stars played a total of twelve public bouts in 2011, with nine wins in total. This record saw them voted amongst the top eight members of the UKRDA and qualified them to play at the Tattoo Freeze 2012 tournament in January of the following year. They would eventually be eliminated in the quarterfinals after a tense game against the Auld Reekie Rollergirls.

In October 2012, the Dollies were accepted as a member of the WFTDA Apprentice Program, and became a full member of the WFTDA in July 2014.

== Teams ==
The league currently fields two teams:

- All-Stars (A)
- Rockin' Rockets (B)

The league has undergone restructuring with some teams retired:

- Raggy Dollz – B team, disbanded 2013
- Foxton Blocks – home team, disbanded 2014. Their name was a reference to Foxton Locks, a popular Leicestershire tourist attraction.
- Angry Belvoirs – home team, disbanded 2014. Their name was a pun on the Leicestershire town of Belvoir (pronounced "beaver").
- Undercover Meerkats – home team, disbanded 2014. Their name was a pun on the Leicester's famous market.

== National Team Representation ==
At the 2011 Roller Derby World Cup and 2014 Roller Derby World Cup, the league's Rogue Runner played for Team England Roller Derby. Holly Sheet was selected for Team Ireland Roller Derby in 2011.

== WFTDA rankings ==
Season	Final ranking	Playoffs	Championship
2016	251 WFTDA	DNQ	DNQ
2017	308 WFTDA	DNQ	DNQ
2018	241 WFTDA	DNQ	DNQ
2019	354 WFTDA	DNQ	DNQ
2020	350 WFTDA	DNQ	DNQ

*Please note that rankings were suspended in March 2020 in light of the COVID-19 pandemic.

== Five Nations Roller Derby Championships ==
At the first British Championships in 2015, the Dolly Rockit Rollers were placed into the 'Women T3 West' tier. They lost all their games.

For the British Roller Derby Championships 2016: Women Tier 4 West, the Dollys performed better, ending in second place.

This strong performance led to their promotion back to the Women's T3 Regional division for 2017, where they remained in 2018.

In 2021, the British Championships rebranded as the Five Nations Roller Derby Championships.

== Game history ==
The following is a list of open-door interleague games played by the Dolly Rockit Rollers since their inception in 2010.

Date	Home/Away	DRR Team	Opponent	Result (DRR score shown first)	Bout name
25 Sep 2010	Home	DRR All-stars	Newcastle Roller Girls	68–79	Block the Casbah
23 Oct 2010	Away	DRR All-stars	Granite City Roller Girls	82–56	Jammerblocky
20 Nov 2010	Home	DRR All-stars	Wakey Wheeled Cats	109–76	Helter Belter
5 Feb 2011	Home	DRR All-stars	Romsey Town Rollerbillies	129–126 (Overtime)	Birthday Bash
26 Feb 2011	Away	DRR All-stars	Liverpool Roller Birds	111–68	A Hard Days Fight
2 April 2011	Away	DRR All-stars	Hot Wheel Roller Derby	102–43	Great Yorkshire Showdown
2 April 2011	Away	DRR All-stars	Manchester Roller Derby	52–83	Great Yorkshire Showdown
7 May 2011	Away	DRR Free Birds (B-team)	Newcastle Roller Girls	64–44	Sweet Home Alajammer
7 May 2011	Away	DRR All-stars	Newcastle Roller Girls	83–107	Sweet Home Alajammer
6 Aug 2011	Home	DRR All-stars	Tiger Bay Brawlers	86–95	School of Block
10 Sep 2011	Home	DRR All-stars	Hot Wheel Roller Derby	128–119	Club TropiCarnage
24 Sep 2011	Away	DRR All-stars	Royal Windsor Rollergirls	161–63	Unthemed
1 Oct 2011	Away	DRR Raggy Dollz	Dawn of the Dames	123–84	Rolling Dead
1 Oct 2011	Away	DRR All-stars	Birmingham Blitz Dames	120–86	Rolling Dead
5 Nov 2011	Home	DRR All-stars	Granite City Roller Girls	163–57	Beats International
18 Nov 2011	Home	DRR All-stars	Lincolnshire Bombers Roller Girls	131–130	Rollerburn
17 Dec 2011	Away	DRR All-stars	Rainy City Roller Girls Tender Hooligans	160–94	Christmas Bonanza
15 Jan 2012	Home	DRR All-stars	Auld Reekie Roller Girls	60–100	Tattoo Freeze
11 Feb 2012	Away	DRR All-stars	London Rockin' Rollers Rising Stars	165–123	Jammer Throw
11 Feb 2012	Home	DRR Raggy Dollz	SSRG Crucibelles	165–101	Hit Her With Glitter
11 Feb 2012	Home	DRR All-stars	Sheffield Steel Rollergirls	131–196	Hit Her With Glitter
31 Mar 2012	Away	DRR Raggy Dollz	Wakey Wheeled Cats	211–126	Hoedown Showdown
21 Apr 2012	Home	DRR All-stars	Liverpool Roller Birds	308–124	The Blocky Horror Picture Show
5 May 2012	Away	DRR All-stars	Big Bucks High Rollers	158–169 (Overtime)	Cinco De Mayhem
19 May 2012	Home	DRR Raggy Dollz	Norfolk Brawds Roller Derby	271–58	Unthemed
26 May 2012	Away	DRR All-stars	Brighton Rockers Roller Derby	69–224	A Right Royal Rumble
9 Jun 2012	Home	DRR All-stars	Helsinki Roller Derby	71–99	Fight to the Finnish
14 Jul 2012	Home	DRR All-stars	Romsey Town Rollerbillies	151–120	Unthemed
4 Aug 2012	Home	DRR All-stars	Blitz Dames	93–121	Super Jamio
8 Sept 2012	Home	DRR All-stars	Royal Windsor Roller Girls	77–184	SuperJammersGoBallistic...!
29 Sept 2012	Away	Raggy Dollz	Kent Roller Girls	82–184	Block n Roll High School
13 Oct 2012	Away	DRR All-stars	Tiger Bay Brawlers	30–496	Unnamed
17 Nov 2012	Home	Raggy Dollz	Portsmouth Roller Wenches	112–134	My Big Fat Derby Wedding
8 Dec 2012	Away	DRR All-stars	Hot Wheel Roller Derby	75–296	Unnamed
17 Feb 2013	Home	DRR All-stars	Bristol Harbour Harlots	116–273	Smack Down
16 Mar 2013	Away	DRR All-stars	One Love Roller Dolls	120–165	Glam Block
17 Mar 2013	Away	DRR All-stars	Go-Go Gent Roller Derby	74–300	Closed door
20 Apr 2013	Home	DRR All-stars	Croydon	106–229	Tank Grrls
21 Apr 2013	Away	DRR All-stars	Seaside Sirens	162–178	Merby Opener
11 May 2013	Away	DRR All-stars	Middlesbrough Milk Rollers	112–326	Unnamed bout
1 Jun 2013	Home	DRR All-stars	Batter C Power	103–308	Tank Grrl
13 Jul 2013	Home	DRR All-stars	Brighton B	110–88	Darbie Grrl
07 Sept 2013	Away	DRR All-stars	Sheffield Steel Roller Girls	90–314	Unnamed
2 Nov 2013	Home	DRR All-stars	Big Bucks High Rollers	264–71	Blockamole
23 Nov 2013	Away	DRR All-stars	Portsmouth Roller Wenches	165–262	Tash Bash!
12 Jan 2014	Away	DRR All-stars	Central City Roller Girls	28–372	Tattoo Freeze 2014
25 Jan 2014	Home	DRR All-stars	Vienna Roller Girls	157–286	Ultrablox
22 Feb 2014	Away	DRR All-stars	Tiger Bay Brawlers B	86–202	Tiger Bay double header
29 Mar 2014	Home	DRR All-stars	Kent Roller Girls	119–177	U Kent Touch This
26 Apr 2014	Away	DRR All-stars	Rainy City Roller Girls	138–103	Unnamed
27 Apr 2014	Away	DRR All-stars	Milton Keynes Concrete Cows	79–211	Super Slam Down
17 May 2014	Home	DRR All-stars	London Rockin Rollers B	167–145	Space Dinosaurs on Skates
12 July 2014	Away	DRR All-stars	Rebellion Roller Derby	251–135	Unknown
25 Oct 2014	Away	DRR All-stars	Central City Roller Girls	85–202	CCR Tournament
31 Jan 2015	Home	DRR All-stars	Rebellion Roller Derby	213–110	Hunger Games
1 Mar 2015	Away	DRR All-stars	Hereford Roller Girls	123–133	British Championships
14 Mar 2015	Home	DRR All-stars	Hell's Bells	188–109	Pi Day Games
29 Mar 2015	Away	DRR All-stars	Belfast Roller Derby	147–297	British Championships
18 Apr 2015	Away	DRR All-stars	Roller Derby Porto	140–189	Porto Game
16 May 2015	Away	DRR All-stars	Swansea City Roller Derby	50–401	British Championships
27 Jun 2015	Home	DRR All-stars	Birmingham Blitz Dames	42–400	British Championships
11 Jul 2015	Away	DRR All-stars	RCRG Tender Hooligans	191–178	Away game

Last updated: 25 Jul 2012
Source: Euroderby.org
