= London Rockin' Rollers =

Roller derby league

- Metro area: London, England
- Country: United Kingdom
- Founded: 2007
- Teams: Allstars (A team), Rising Stars (B team), Goldie Lookin' Chain Gang, NeanderDolls, Voodoo Skull Krushers
- Track type: Flat
- Venue: Tottenham Leisure Centre, Tottenham
- Affiliations: WFTDA
- Org. type: Not-for-profit
- Website: londonrockinrollers.co.uk

London Rockin' Rollers (LRR) is a flat-track roller derby league based in London, England. Founded in 2007, the league is a member of both the United Kingdom Roller Derby Association (UKRDA) and the Women's Flat Track Derby Association (WFTDA).

== League History ==
The league was started in 2007, by a group of founding members including Jackie Mason (derby name Jack Attack). At the time, there were only two other roller derby teams in the UK: the London Rollergirls and the Birmingham Blitz Dames.

The team participated in the UK's first ever closed-door, interleague scrimmage (practice game) against Birmingham on 1 July 2007. They made history again later in the year when they played the Stuttgart Valley Roller Girlz in Europe's first international bout on 14 October, which they lost 94-71.

In 2009, the league presented their first home bouting season at the historic York Hall in Bethnal Green. The league also hosted its very first intraleague bout on 27 February 2010, a closely fought bout between the Voodoo Skull Krushers and the NeanderDolls.

In January 2012, London Rockin' Rollers competed in, and won, the UKRDA's "Tattoo Freeze" tournament. In June, several of LRR were part of the 2012 Summer Olympics opening ceremony and the 2012 Summer Paralympics opening ceremony. In September, Kit Kat Power represented Team Sweden against USA Roller Derby and Jack Attack represented Team England, also against Team USA.

In October 2012, the league was accepted as a member of the WFTDA Apprentice Program, and became a full member of the WFTDA in September 2013.

== Teams ==
There are two travel teams, who compete against teams from other leagues:

- Allstars (A)
- Rising Stars (B; often referred to as London Rockin' Rollers Badasses, formed 2010)

The London Rockin' Rollers founded three home teams in 2009:

- The NeanderDolls,
- Voodoo Skull Krushers, now known as VSK
- Goldie Lookin' Chain Gang, known as Goldies.

== National Team Representation ==
Four league members were involved in the 2011 Roller Derby World Cup. Jack Attack and The Mighty Mighty Bash skated for Team England Roller Derby who ended in third place, Kit Kat Power represented Team Sweden Roller Derby (sixth place) and Dr D Zaster as a referee.

For the 2014 Roller Derby World Cup, LRR were represented by Betty Swollox skating for Team England.

Irn Brute was on the Team Scotland Roller Derby training squad in the 2018 Roller Derby World Cup.

== WFTDA rankings ==
Season	Final ranking	Playoffs	Championship
2014	201 WFTDA	DNQ	DNQ
2015	217 WFTDA	DNQ	DNQ
2016	250 WFTDA	DNQ	DNQ
2017	254 WFTDA	DNQ	DNQ
2018	272 WFTDA	DNQ	DNQ
2019	322 WFTDA	DNQ	DNQ
2020	322 WFTDA	DNQ	DNQ

*Please note that rankings were suspended in March 2020 in light of the COVID-19 pandemic.

== Competitive History ==
=== 2013 ===
Home

23 March London Rockin' Rollers 252 : 104 Hot Wheel Roller Derby
11 May London Rockin' Rollers 196 : 135 Hellfire Harlots
22 June London Rockin' Rollers 150 : 149 Paris Rollergirls
29 June London Rockin' Rollers (B) 166 : 155 Hells Belles Roller Derby
6 July London Rockin' Rollers 120 : 145 Copenhagen Roller Derby
4 September London Rockin' Rollers 119 : 205 Gent Go Go Rollergirls
13 October London Rockin' Rollers (B) 111 : 208 Mean Valley Roller Girls
26 October London Rockin' Rollers 41 : 769 Southern Discomfort Roller Derby
14 December London Rockin' Rollers (B) 87 : 237 Malmo Crime City Rollers B
14 December London Rockin' Rollers 144 : 283 Malmo Crime City Rollers

Away

9 March London Rockin Rollers 210 : 237 Brighton Rockers Roller Derby
6 June London Rockin' Rollers 62 : 255 Stockholm Roller Derby
3 August London Rockin' Rollers 255 : 76 Birmingham Blitz Dames (Feel Good Hits Of The Summer)
3 August London Rockin' Rollers 121 : 190 Middlesbrough Milk Rollers (Feel Good Hits Of The Summer)

=== 2012 ===
Home

9 June London Rockin' Rollers 244: 209 Dublin Rollergirls
20 October London Rockin' Rollers 100: 172 Stockholm Roller Derby
15 December GLCG 83: 98 VSK
15 December VSK 46: 85 Neanderdolls
15 December Neanderdolls 128: 84 GLCG
15 December VSK 84: 71 Neanderdolls

Away

15 January London Rockin' Rollers 122 : 44 Lincolnshire Bombers Roller Girls (Tattoo Freeze)
15 January London Rockin' Rollers 78 : 61 Auld Reekie Roller Girls (Tattoo Freeze)
15 January London Rockin' Rollers 105: 23 Central City Rollergirls (Tattoo Freeze)
18 February London Rockin' Rollers (B) 123: 165 Dolly Rockit Rollers
31 March London Rockin' Rollers (B) 84: 254 Tiger Bay Brawlers
19 May London Rockin' Rollers 109: 223 Central City Rollergirls
16 June London Rockin' Rollers 119: 91 Leeds Roller Dolls
19 August London Rockin' Rollers 145: 122 Big Bucks High Rollers
25 August London Rockin' Rollers 114: 168 Glasgow Roller Derby (Chaos On The Clyde)
25 August London Rockin' Rollers 152: 107 Stuttgart Valley Rollergirlz (Chaos On The Clyde)
26 August London Rockin' Rollers 92: 173 Auld Reekie Roller Girls (Chaos On The Clyde)

=== 2011 ===
Home

5 February Goldie Lookin' Chain Gang 98 : 109 Voodoo Skull Krushers (2010 Final)
19 March London Rockin' Rollers 172 : 31 Leeds Roller Dolls
19 March London Rockin' Rollers (B) 112 : 73 Tiger Bay Brawlers
1 May London Rockin' Rollers 101 : 123 Central City Rollergirls
1 May Neanderdolls 86 : 73 VSK
2 July London Rockin' Rollers (B) 170 : 44 Bedfordshire Roller Girls
2 July GLCG 117 : 92 Neanderdolls
3 September London Rockin' Rollers 149 : 110 Auld Reekie Roller Girls [Twisted Thistles]
3 September London Rockin' Rollers (B) 124 : 126 Auld Reekie Roller Girls [Cannon Belles]
16 October London Rockin' Rollers (A) 212 : 115 Stuttgart Valley Rollergirlz
16 October Voodoo Skull Krushers 178 : 118 Goldie Lookin' Chain Gang
10 December London Rockin' Rollers 218 : 102 Southern Discomfort Roller Derby

Away

15 January London Rockin' Rollers 117: 63 Auld Reekie Roller Girls (Tattoo Freeze)
15 January London Rockin' Rollers 76 : 96 London Rollergirls (B) (Tattoo Freeze)
16 January London Rockin' Rollers 116 : 55 Central City Rollergirls (Tattoo Freeze)
14 May Central City Rollergirls 99 : 90 London Rockin' Rollers
23 July Crime City Rollers 300 : 43 London Rockin' Rollers (B)
19 November Berlin Bombshells (B) 150 : 149 London Rockin Rollers (B)
19 November Berlin Bombshells (A) 187 : 195 London Rockin' Rollers (A)

=== 2010 ===
Home

27 February NeanderDolls 95 : 98 VSK
15 May London Rockin' Rollers: 105 : 88 Rainy City Roller Girls [Manchester Motley Crew]
21 August VSK 118 :120 Goldie Lookin' Chain Gang
14 November Neanderdolls 65: 109 GLCG

Away

13 February Glasgow Roller Girls [Irn Bruisers] 116 : 102 London Rockin' Rollers
19 June Leeds Roller Dolls [Rotten Rollers] 94 : 116 London Rockin' Rollers
7 August Auld Reekie Roller Girls 93: 117 London Rockin' Rollers
16 October Stuttgart Valley Roller Girlz 85 : 116 London Rockin' Rollers
30 October Royal Windsor Roller Girls 72 : 158 London Rockin' Rollers
4 December Kallio Rolling Rainbow 64 : 192 London Rockin' Rollers - B

=== 2009 ===
Home

21 March London Rockin' Rollers 83 : 103 Glasgow Roller Girls [Irn Bruisers]
20 June London Rockin' Rollers 142 : 57 Royal Windsor Roller Girls
Sept 05 London Rockin' Rollers 119 : 105 Stuttgart Valley Rollergirlz
21 Nov London Rockin' Rollers 179 : 61 Birmingham Blitz Derby Dames

Away

18 July

Roll Britannia

Glasgow Roller Girls [Irn Bruisers] 59 : 48 London Rockin' Rollers
London Rockin' Rollers 137 : 46 Rainy City Rollergirls

=== 2008 ===
Away

Sept 17 Stuttgart Valley Rollergirlz 76 : 81 London Rockin' Rollers
27 Oct London Rockin' Rollers 109 : 110 Birmingham Blitz Derby Dames
