= Bristol Roller Derby =

Roller derby league

- Metro area: Bristol
- Country: England
- Founded: 2010
- Teams: Bristol Roller Derby A-Team (WFTDA); Bristol Bees (WFTDA); Bristol All-Stars (co-ed); Bristol Rising Stars (co-ed)
- Track type: Flat
- Venue: Merchants Academy Bristol
- Website: www.bristolrollerderby.com

Bristol Roller Derby (BRD) is a roller derby club based in Bristol. Founded in 2010, the club consists of both WFTDA (Women's Flat Track Derby Association) and OTA (open to all) teams.

== History ==
The league was founded early in 2010 by Tuisku Sarrala, Anna Wong, Laura Phillips, Laura Lopez, Maria Cormack, Simone Bennett and Verona. Anna Wong, who had previously played the sport in New Zealand, became the league's head coach for the inaugural year, before returning to New Zealand in January 2011. Originally known as the Bristol Harbour Harlots,. By mid-2011, the league had more than seventy skaters, and had hosted a sell-out bout.

One of the league's founder members, Tuisku Sarrala (derby name The Blizzard), competed for Team Finland at the 2011 Roller Derby World Cup.

On 1 November 2012, Bristol Roller Derby merged with another local roller derby team, Anarchic Die Hard Derby (ADHD). ADHD's founders were skaters who were unable to join Bristol Roller Derby during a period in which Bristol's recruitment was closed. Following the merger, ADHD became Bristol's fourth home team, bringing the number of active skaters to over 50. Together with officials, the Fresh Meat intake of October 2012, and non-skating members, the league membership stood at over 100 members at the beginning of November 2012.

In December 2012, the league was accepted as a member of the United Kingdom Roller Derby Association.

In 2016, they were discussed in an article on bears associated with Bristol, in which members Grizzly and Bear Thrylls featured.

In 2025 the club was featured in James Yorkston's music video for his song "Oh Light, Oh Light" featuring Johanna Söderberg (First Aid Kit). The music video shows clips from the club's "2010 Again" 15th birthday celebrations.

== League Structure ==
=== Travel Teams ===
- Bristol Roller Derby A-Team (WFTDA, previously known as The Harbour Harlots)
- Bristol Bees (WFTDA)
- Bristol All-Stars (co-ed)
- Bristol Rising Stars (co-ed)

=== Former Teams ===
- Vice Quad (men's team)

Home Teams:

- Anarchic Die Hard Derby
- Daughters of Anarchy
- Project Mayhem
- Smash Vandals

=== New Skater Training ===
"New Skater Training" sessions are run for anyone over 18 wanting to learn how to play roller derby. Unlike other training sessions organised by the league, attendees do not have to be a member of the club to participate. There are no attendance requirements or prior skating skills required and kit is available to borrow.

== British Roller Derby Championships ==
In 2016 both the women's A team and the men's team achieved promotion in the British Championships tournament, the men into tier 3 and the women into premier tier 1.

Their 2017 season was featured in the local press.

On 16 September 2018, the All-Stars beat the North Wales Men's team to gain promotion into Tier 2 of the British Championships. This game was streamed on BBC Sport, a first for the team.

== Bouts ==
The table below lists the bouts played by the Bristol Roller Derby's travel teams – the Harbour Harlots

Date	Event	Home/Away	Team	Opponent	Results	Won by	Venue
11 December 2010	Tinsel and Torture	Away	Harbour Harlots	Severn Roller Torrent	138–60	SRT	
15 January 2011	Star Check : First Contact	Away	Harbour Harlots	Tiger Bay Brawlers	173–37	TBB	
9 July 2011	Painspotting	Home	Harbour Harlots	Severn Roller Torrent	195–91	BHH	UWE Sports Centre
13 November 2011		Away	Harbour Harlots	Croydon Roller Derby	123–117	CRD	
26 November 2011		Away	Harbour Harlots	Cardiff Roller Collective: Rude Birds	134–125	CRoC	
4 December 2011	I love Block'n'Roll	Home	Harbour Harlots	South West Angels of Terror: A Team	167–107	SWAT	WISE
2 June 2012	Hell and High Water	Away	Harbour Harlots	Nottingham Hellfire Harlots	203–118	NHH	
9 June 2012	Grime and Punishment	Home	Harbour Harlots	Swansea City Slayers	276–46	BHH	WISE
16 June 2012	Helter Skelter Belter	Away	Harbour Harlots	Seaside Siren Roller Girls: Coastbusters (A team)	193–43	BHH	
8 September 2012	Central City Rollergirls: Double Header	Away	Harbour Harlots (A)	Central City Rollergirls: Slay Belles (B team)	24–211	BHH	Doug Ellis Sports Centre
14 October 2012	October Double Header	Home	Harbour Harlots (B)	Wiltshire Roller Derby	217–130	BHHb	WISE
14 October 2012	October Double Header	Home	Harbour Harlots (A)	Croydon Roller Derby	207–138	BHHa	WISE
3 November 2012		Away	Harbour Harlots (A)	Birmingham Blitz Dames: A team	171–185	BHHa	Futsal, Birmingham
11 November 2012		Away	Harbour Harlots (B)	Norfolk Brawds	153–224	BHHb	
2 December 2012		Home	Harbour Harlots (A)	Rain City Roller Derby - Tender Hooligans			
2 December 2012		Home	Harbour Harlots (B)	Wolverhampton Honour Rollers			
26 January 2013		Away	Harbour Harlots (A)	Dolly Rockit Rollers	116–237	BHHa	Midlands Roller Arena
2 March 2013		Home	Harbour Harlots (A)	Leeds Roller Dolls - Whip-Its	245-91	BHHa	
2 March 2013		Home	Harbour Harlots (B)	Mean Valley Rollergirls	162-227		WISE
23 March 2013		Away	Harbour Harlots (A)	Big Bucks High Rollers	132-184	BHHa	
13 April 2013		Away	Harbour Harlots (B)	Royal Windsor Rollergirls	204-131	RWRG	
21 April 2013		Away	Harbour Harlots (A)	Lincolnshire Bombers Bombshell Bruisers	171-193	BHHa	
21 April 2013		Away	Harbour Harlots (B)	Lincolnshire Bombers Damebusters	148-128		
