= Five Nations Roller Derby Championships =

Annual roller derby competition in the United Kingdom and Ireland

- Current season, competition or edition: 2025
- Formerly: End of the World Series; Heartland Series; British Roller Derby Championships
- Sport: Roller derby
- Founded: 2015
- No. of teams: 51 (WFTDA); 17 (MRDA); 6 (JRDA)
- Country: United Kingdom and Ireland
- Most recent champions: Newcastle Canny Belters (WFTDA); Tyne and Fear (MRDA) (2025)
- Level on pyramid: 4 (WFTDA); 3 (MRDA); 1 (JRDA)
- Website: fivenationsrollerderby.com

The Five Nations Roller Derby Championships is an annual competition for roller derby leagues from England, Scotland, Wales, Northern Ireland and the Republic of Ireland.

== History ==
The tournament originated as the End of the World Series, a 2012 league of six roller derby teams in central England. The success of this competition led it to expand in 2013 under the new name of the Heartland Series, with twelve teams in two division, and it doubled in size again in 2014. In 2021, the competition rebranded as the Five Nations Roller Derby Championships.

Year	Competition	Champions
2012	End of the World Series	Milton Keynes Roller Derby
2013	Heartland Series	Severn Roller Torrent
2014	Heartland Series	Romsey Town Rollerbillies

== 2015 Championships ==
In 2015, the tournament partnered with the United Kingdom Roller Derby Association (UKRDA) and was renamed as the British Roller Derby Championships. This greatly expanded competition consisted of 72 teams playing across several tiers, making it the largest roller derby competition in Europe. For the first time, it accepted teams from across the UK, including a separate competition for men's teams.

Tier	Tournament	Champions	Runners-up
1	Women	Glasgow Roller Derby	Auld Reekie Roller Girls
2	Women	Newcastle Roller Girls	Nottingham Hellfire Harlots
3	Women	Birmingham Blitz Dames	Cambridge Rollerbillies
4 North	Women	Hallam Hellcats Roller Derby	Preston Roller Girls
4 South	Women	Wirral Whipiteres Roller Derby	Bath Roller Derby Girls
4 West	Women	The Norfolk Brawds Roller Derby	Killa Hurtz Roller Girls
1	Men	Southern Discomfort Roller Derby	South Wales Silures
2	Men	New Wheeled Order	Barrow Infernos
3	Men	Wirral Pack Animals	Kings of Block and Roll

== 2016 Championships ==
As of 2016, the women's section of the tournament is divided into five tiers. Tiers 2 to 4 are further split between geographical divisions of four to six teams. Teams competing in the two top tiers must hold membership of the UKRDA.

The men's section is divided into three tiers, with the third tier divided into two geographical divisions.

Tier	Tournament	Champions	Runners-up
1	Women	Newcastle Roller Girls	London Rollergirls Brawl Saints
2	Women	Birmingham Blitz Dames	Bristol Roller Derby
3	Women	Swansea City Roller Derby	Manchester Roller Derby
4 East	Women	Rebellion Roller Derby	Borderland Brawlers Roller Derby
4 North	Women	Granite City Roller Girls	Halifax Bruising Banditas
4 South	Women	Dorset Roller Girls	Riot City Ravens
4 West	Women	Nottingham Roller Derby	Dolly Rockit Rollers
5	Women	Neath Port Talbot Roller Derby	Wiltshire Roller Derby
1	Men	Southern Discomfort Roller Derby	Tyne and Fear Roller Derby
2	Men	The Inhuman League	Crash Test Brummies
3	Men	Suffolk Roller Derby	Bristol Vice Quad

== 2017 Championships ==
For 2017, the women's section was rationalised to four tiers.

Tier	Tournament	Champions	Runners-up
1	Women	Middlesbrough Roller Derby	London Rollergirls Brawl Saints
2	Women	Rainy City Roller Derby B	London Rockin Rollers
3	Women	Rebellion Roller Derby	The Norfolk Brawds Roller Derby
4 East	Women	Wiltshire Roller Derby	Lincolnshire Bombers Roller Girls
4 North	Women	Mansfield Roller Derby	Wakey Wheeled Cats
4 South	Women	Neath Port Talbot Roller Derby	Hereford Roller Girls
4 West	Women	Roller Derby Leicester	Riverside Rebels Roller Derby
1	Men	Tyne and Fear Roller Derby	New Wheeled Order
2	Men	Southern Discomfort Roller Derby Mild Discomfort	Barrow Infernos
3	Men	Oxford Men's Roller Derby	Teesside Skate Invaders

== 2018 Championships ==
Tier	Tournament	Champions	Runners-up
1	Women	Central City Rollergirls	Liverpool Roller Girls
2	Women	Rebellion Roller Derby	Norfolk Roller Derby
3	Women	Cambridge Rollerbillies	Hulls Angels Roller Derby
4 North	Women	Furness Firecrackers	Spa Town Roller Girls
4 East	Women	Suffolk Women's A	Vendetta Vixens
4 South	Women	Plymouth City Roller Derby	Milton Keynes Concrete Cows
4 West	Women	Arcadia Roller Derby	Blackpool Roller Derby
1	Men	New Wheeled Order	Tyne and Fear
2	Men	Lincolnshire Thugly Duckings	Oxford Men's Roller Derby
3	Men	Bristol Roller Derby	North Wales Roller Derby

== 2019 Championships ==
Tier	Tournament	Champions	Runners-up
1	WFTDA	Liverpool Roller Birds	Manchester Roller Derby
2	WFTDA	Wiltshire Roller Derby	North Wales Roller Derby
3 East	WFTDA	Grimsby Roller Derby	York Minxters Roller Derby
3 North	WFTDA	Belfast Roller Derby	Spa Town Roller Derby
3 South	WFTDA	Big Bucks High Rollers	Vendetta Vixens
3 West	WFTDA	Severn Roller Torrent	Wolverhampton Honour Rollers
1	MRDA	New Wheeled Order	Lincolnshire Thugly Ducklings
2 North	MRDA	North Wales Roller Derby	Tyne and Fear B
2 South	MRDA	Kent Men's Roller Derby	Dorset Knobs Roller Derby

== 2024 Tournament + Playoffs ==
In 2024, the WFTDA section of the tournament was divided into fours tiers. Tiers 2 to 4 are further split between geographical divisions of four to six teams. The MRDA section was divided into three tiers and the JRDA section had 1 tier, split up into two geographical divisions of three teams.

Tier	Tournament	1st	2nd	3rd
1	WFTDA	Auld Reekie All Stars	London Brawl Saints	Liverpool Sisters of Mersey
2 North	WFTDA	Newcastle Canny Belters	Hallam Hellcats Roller Derby	Wiltshire Roller Derby
2 South	WFTDA	Rebellion Roller Derby	Sheffield Steel Roller Derby	North Wales Roller Derby
3 North	WFTDA	Dublin Roller Derby B	Auld Reekie Reserves	Belfast Roller Derby
3 Central	WFTDA	Nottingham Roller Derby Arrows	Oxford Blackbirds	Leeds Roller Derby B
3 East	WFTDA	Kent Roller Derby	Cambridge Rollerbillies	London Batter C Power
3 West	WFTDA	Severn Roller Torrent	Devon Roller Derby A	Bridgend Roller Derby
4 North	WFTDA	Arcadia	Hulls Angels Roller Derby	Furness Firecrackers
4 East	WFTDA	Herts Roller Derby	Bath Spartans	Surrey Roller Girls
4 South	WFTDA	Tiger Bay Challengers	Cornwall Roller Derby	Swansea Roller Derby
4 West	WFTDA	Wirral Wave Breakers	Liverpool Yellow Shovemarines	Stoke City Rollers
1	MRDA			
2	MRDA			
3	MRDA			
North	JRDA			
South	JRDA			

Playoffs 2024

Tier	Tournament	Champions	Runners-up
1	WFTDA		
2	WFTDA		
3	WFTDA		
1	MRDA		
2	MRDA		
1	JRDA		
