= Norfolk Roller Derby =

Roller derby league

- Metro area: Norwich
- Country: United Kingdom
- Founded: 2010
- Teams: The Norfolk Brawds (A), The Black Shucks (B), The East Anglo Smacksons, Mustard City Rollers
- Track type: Flat
- Website: https://www.norfolkrollerderby.co.uk/

Norfolk Roller Derby (NRD) are a flat track roller derby league based in Norwich, England and were the first roller derby team to form within the county. Initially playing as The Norfolk Brawds, they changed their name to Norfolk Roller Derby in 2019.

While not a member, the league uses the Women's Flat Track Derby Association (WFTDA) ruleset.

== League Structure ==
The league consists of four travel teams:

- The Norfolk Brawds (A team, WFTDA-aligned, formed 2010)
- The Black Shucks (B team, WFTDA-aligned, formed 2015)
- The East Anglo Smacksons (MRDA-aligned, formed 2012)
- Mustard City Rollers (open to skaters of all genders)

There are also two home teams who compete in an intraleague tournament.

== League history ==
The league was formed in 2010 and is entirely owned and run democratically by its members. The Norfolk Brawds competed their first full season of bouting in 2012. In January 2012 the team announced their first major sponsor, local rock stars The Darkness.

On 4 August 2012 The Norfolk Brawds held their first "open door" home event at the UEA Sportspark. At the event, they served their own real ale, Bonny’s Gold, made for them by the local Golden Triangle Brewery.

The Brawds made their debut in their first major championship "The Heartland Series", the competition which became the British Roller Derby Championships, in 2013.

NRD joined the United Kingdom Roller Derby Association in 2013, but announced their departure from the organisation in December 2018 due to a dispute around grievance resolution.

== Five Nations Roller Derby Championships ==
=== Norfolk Brawds ===
The Norfolk Brawds competed in the precursor to the British Championships, the "Heartland Series" in 2013 and 2014. In 2021, the British Championships rebranded as the Five Nations Roller Derby Championships.

In 2015, they participated in the Women T4 South East tier of the competition, where they beat Eastbourne Roller Derby in their first game, 246-40. Next they faced Full Metal Roller Derby's Herts Breakers and won, 564-21, before also winning against Suffolk Roller Derby, 243-63. Their final opponents were Killa Hurtz Roller Derby, who they defeated, 144-138. This success took them to the Women T4 Playoffs - Southern seeded tournament, beating both Surrey Roller Girls, 305-84, and Killa Hurtz Roller Derby, 173-125.

This performance saw them rise to Women Tier 3 East in the 2016 competition. They had a strong start, beating their first three opponents: Milton Keynes Roller Derby, 155-126; Killa Hurtz Roller Derby, 208-116; and Roller Derby Leicester, 315-79. They lost to Hertfordshire Roller Derby's Hell's Belles, 140-128, and to Seaside Siren Roller Girls, 164-133.

A reorganisation of the competition saw them in the Women's T3 Regional tier in 2017. Rebellion Roller Derby beat the Brawds, 272-143, who then beat Bath Roller Derby Girls, 305-130. The league won their next game against North Devon Roller Derby, 303-66, and the next against Surrey Roller Girls, 473-65. Hertfordshire Roller Derby's Hell's Belles were defeated by the Brawds, 301-181, but Rebellion Roller Derby were victorious against them, winning 178-114. Killa Hurtz Roller Derby also failed to stand up to the Norfolk team, losing 316-91 in the Brawds' final game of that year's competition.

This display of strength earned them a promotion to the Women's T2 UKRDA National tier for the 2018 season. They lost their first game to Rebellion Roller Derby, 299-79, but won the second, against London Roller Derby's Batter C Power, 214-89. Next, they played Auld Reekie Roller Derby's All-Star Reserves (B) and won, 261-124. Their following game was a rematch against Rebellion Roller Derby, and another loss for the Brawds, 207-194. The next two games were more successful for the Norfolk side, with wins against Sheffield Steel Roller Derby, 189-88, and Wirral Roller Derby's Savage Lilies, 348-44.

Another year and another promotion; 2019 saw the Norfolk Brawds lining up in the Women's T1 Premier tier. SWAT Roller Derby lost, 291-88, to the Norfolk side, but they were beaten by their next opponents, London Batter C Power, 171-129. Their next two games saw Brawds victories, against Cambridge Rollerbillies, 329-38, and Bath Roller Derby, 263-91.

=== East Anglo Smacksons ===
2018 saw the East Anglo Smacksons, compete in their first ever British Roller Derby Championships season. They were in the men's Tier Three South competition, achieving a third-place finish thanks to a victory over local rivals Suffolk Roller Derby.

== Game History ==
Below is a list of open and closed door interleague bouts played by the team.

Date	NBRD Team	Opposing Team	Score
11 May 2011	NBRD Travel Team	Seaside Siren Roller Girls	23-188
19 May 2012	NBRD Travel Team	Dolly Rockit Rollers - Raggy Dollz B	58-271
3 June 2012	NBRD Travel Team	Hertfordshire Roller Derby - Hell's Belles Roller Girls	230-59
1 May 2012	NBRD Travel Team	Seaside Siren Roller Girls - Heartless Beaches B	182-141
4 August 2012	NBRD Travel Team	Romsey Town Rollerbillies - Travel Team A	55-288
2 September 2012	NBRD Travel Team	Middlesbrough Milk Rollers - Travel Team B	196-124
7 October 2012	NBRD Travel Team	Surrey Rollergirls - Travel Team A	286-128
11 November 2012	NBRD Travel Team	Bristol Roller Derby - Harbour Harlots B	153-244
9 February 2013	NBRD Travel Team	Bedfordshire Roller Girls	143-120
23 March 2013	NBRD Travel Team	Birmingham Blitz Dames	tba
11 May 2013	NBRD Travel Team	Northampton Roller Derby Vendetta Vixens	tba

== In The Media ==
Skater Gemma Seager (derby name Gem Warfare) raised awareness of myeloma in the local press after her own diagnosis, and also discussed her lifestyle blog and fitness regime which grew up around her roller derby training.

Tarnia Mears of the league was named one of the 100 most inspiring women in Norfolk.
