= Sheffield Steel Roller Derby =

Roller derby league

- Metro area: Sheffield
- Country: United Kingdom
- Founded: August 2008
- Teams: All Stars (A team)
- Track type(s): Flat
- Venue: Skate Central, Sheffield
- Affiliations: WFTDA
- Org. type: Not for profit, Limited by guarantee.
- Website: www.sheffieldsteelrollerderby.co.uk

Sheffield Steel Roller Derby (SSRD) is a flat track roller derby league based in Sheffield, South Yorkshire, England. Founded in August 2008,

SSRD are a member of the Women's Flat Track Derby Association (WFTDA).

== League Structure ==
The league has over 70 members making up two competitive teams, the All Stars (A) and the Crucibelles (B).

A number of skaters also train as a non-competitive, recreational group called the Molten Mavens. Since 2016, the league run a junior roller derby team, the Sheffield Steel Junior Rollers.

Members of the team include students, teachers, engineers and other professionals, ranging in age from late teens to mid-forties and beyond.

Sheffield Steel Roller Derby practice three times a week with extra sessions outdoors during the summer. The league is a skater-run organisation, managed by a committee of elected officers who head up sub-committees in areas such as training, media, merchandise, sponsorship and events. Officers are re-elected annually, as are the league Captain and Vice Captain.

== History and organisation ==
Pauline Chalmers (derby name Jane Doe-a-Go-Go) established the league as Sheffield Steel Rollergirls in August 2008, after moving to the city to meet new friends and gain new experiences. After discovering roller derby online and finding that there was no team in Sheffield, she created a Myspace profile to find interested locals.

In March 2010, the league received a £700 grant from the Sheffield Telegraph as part of the South Yorkshire Community Foundation's Grassroots Grants programme designed to fund worthwhile projects in Sheffield. This allowed the league to organise their first home bout at Ponds Forge International Sports Centre in July 2010.

On 3 September 2011 the league's B team, the Crucibelles, debuted against Newcastle Roller Girls' B team, the Whippin' Hinnies. This was a double header that also saw the All Stars play Newcastle's A Team, the Canny Belters.

Sheffield Steel Rollergirls entered the WFTDA Apprentice Program in July 2012, and became full members of the WFTDA in June 2013.

In January 2019, the league changed its name to Sheffield Steel Roller Derby as a move to reflect the inclusive nature of the league and the sport as a whole.

== National Team Representation ==
At the 2014 Roller Derby World Cup, Holly Hotrod (17) was part of the Team England training squad while Glenys the Menace was on the Team Wales Roller Derby squad. Erica Mitchell-Packington (She-Rarr, 242) was part of the West Indies Roller Derby squad the same year, and on their management team for the 2018 Roller Derby World Cup. Her Sheffield teammate, Madge Juicer (5), was on the West Indies squad in 2018 and Tom Pritchard was bench coach for the West Indies Roller Derby squad at both the 2014 and 2018 Roller Derby World Cups. The league's Athanasia Carghiaur (Athas' Sin, 11) was in the Romania Roller Derby squad for the 2018 Roller Derby World Cup.

== WFTDA rankings ==
Season	Final ranking	Playoffs	Championship
2016	299 WFTDA	DNQ	DNQ
2017	326 WFTDA	DNQ	DNQ
2018	NR	DNQ	DNQ
2019	315 WFTDA	DNQ	DNQ
2020	329 WFTDA	DNQ	DNQ

*Please note that rankings were suspended in March 2020 in light of the COVID-19 pandemic.

- NR = no ranking assigned in this release

== Early games ==
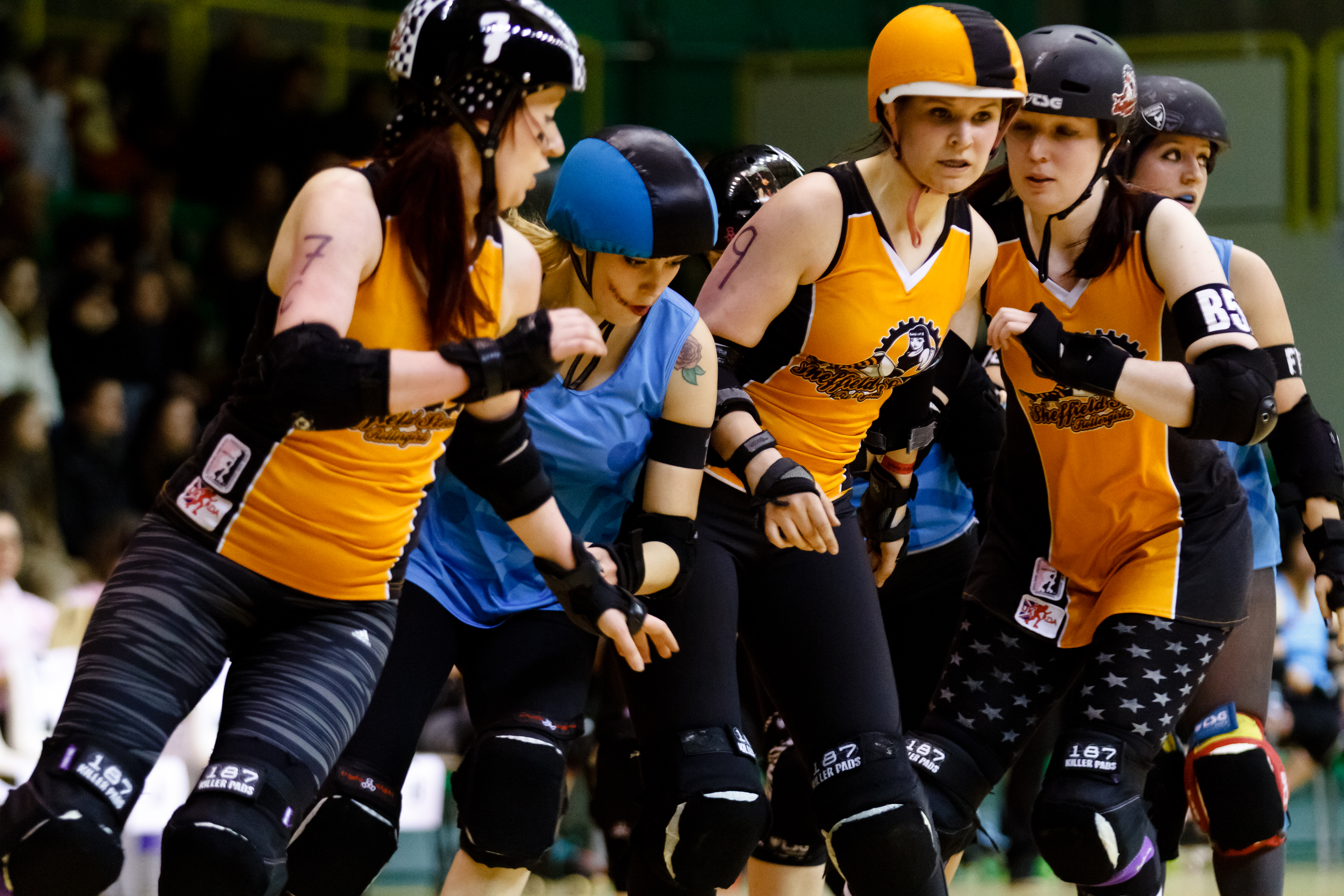
Sheffield Steel Rollergirls vs Nothing Toulouse, March 2014

Date	Event	Home/Away	Team	Opponent	Results¹	Won by	Venue
22 August 2009	"Summer Horror Day"	Away	All Stars	Leeds Roller Dolls "Rotten Rollers"	58 - 274	LRD	Leeds Royal Armouries in Saville's Hall, Leeds
20 February 2010	"2010: A Skate Odyssey"	Away	All Stars	Royal Windsor Rollergirls	97 - 92	SSRG	Wycombe Sports Centre, Bucks
24 July 2010	"Smashdance"	Home	All Stars	Newcastle Roller Girls	150 - 73	SSRG	Ponds Forge International Sports Centre, Sheffield
4 September 2010	"Scar Wash"	Away	All Stars	Central City Rollergirls	40 - 161	CCR	Cocks Moors Woods Leisure Centre, King's Heath, Birmingham
24 October 2010	"The Great Yorkshire Showdown"	Away	All Stars	Liverpool Roller Birds	121 - 28	SSRG	Huddersfield Sport Centre, Huddersfield
24 October 2010	"The Great Yorkshire Showdown"	Away	All Stars	Leeds Roller Dolls "Yorkshire Whip-its"	43 - 69	LRD	Huddersfield Sport Centre, Huddersfield
29 January 2011	"Tarzan and Pain"	Home	All Stars	Middlesbrough Milk Rollers	185 - 34	SSRG	Ponds Forge International Sports Centre, Sheffield
23 April 2011	"The Royal Shredding"	Home	All Stars	Leeds Roller Dolls "Rotten Rollers"	86 - 109	LRD	Ponds Forge International Sports Centre, Sheffield
4 June 2011	"Rock, Block & Two Smoking Jammers"	Away	All Stars	Lincolnshire Bombers Roller Girls	103 - 64	SSRG	George Stephenson Pavilion, Newark Showground, Newark
1 July 2011	"Blocky Balboa"	Home	All Stars	Royal Windsor Roller Girls	83 - 95	RWRG	Ponds Forge International Sports centre, Sheffield
3 September 2011	"Thwack To the future"	Away	All Stars	Newcastle Rollergirls "Canny Belters"	148 - 96	SSRG	Lightfoot Centre, Newcastle upon Tyne
3 September 2011	"Thwack To the future"	Away	Crucibelles	Newcastle Rollergirls "Whippin' Hinnies"	62 - 165	NRG	Lightfoot Centre, Newcastle upon Tyne
17 September 2011	"Dodegbrawl"	Away	Crucibelles	Nottingham Rollergirls	135 - 63	SSRG	Skate Central, Sheffield
9 October 2011	"Cirque du Slay"	Home	All Stars	Central City Rollergirls	119 - 151	CCR	Ponds Forge International Sports Centre, Sheffield
9 October 2011	"Cirque du Slay"	Home	Crucibelles	Liverpool Roller Birds	65 - 75	LRB	Ponds Forge International Sports Centre, Sheffield
26 November 2011	No bout name	Away	Crucibelles	Rainy City Rollergirls "Tender Hooligans"	69 - 264	RCRG	The Thunderdome, Oldham
28 January 2012	"Murder on the Flat Track Express"	Home	All Stars	Big Bucks High Rollers	113 - 144	BBHR	Ponds Forge International Sports Centre, Sheffield
25 February 2012	"Hit Her With Glitter"	Away	Crucibelles	Dolly Rockit Rollers - Raggy Dollz	101 - 165	DRR	Parklands, Oadby
25 February 2012	"Hit Her With Glitter"	Away	All Stars	Dolly Rockit Rollers - All Stars	196 - 131	SSRG	Parklands, Oadby
14 April 2012	"Block Around The Clock"	Home	Crucibelles	Lincolnshire Bombers - Damebusters	190 - 53	SSRG	Ponds Forge International Sports Centre, Sheffield
14 April 2012	"Block Around The Clock"	Home	All Stars	Lincolnshire Bombers - A Team	197 - 46	SSRG	Ponds Forge International Sports Centre, Sheffield

¹ Results from Sheffield Steel Rollergirls' view

== In the media ==
Sheffield Steel Roller Derby have been featured in the Sheffield Telegraph, and the Sheffield Star. The SmashDance event was also mentioned in Exposed Magazine.

Sheffield Steel Rollergirls appeared on ITV1's ITV Calendar on 22 April 2010. They have also had a number of appearances on BBC Radio Sheffield.

On 10 November 2010, the team featured on BBC Online. On 4 December 2010, the team featured on BBC2 Sportsround (repeated on CBBC on 5 December 2010) as part of an "Alternative Sports Special".

Erica Mitchell-Packington (derby name She-Rarr) featured in the documentary film On the Road to Dallas, which explores the lives and preparations of a group of roller derby players as they get ready for the Roller Derby World Cup.

== In the community ==
On 9 April 2010, Sheffield Steel Rollergirls took part in the Showroom Cinema's premiere of Whip It. Ten members of the league completed the Goodwood Roller Marathon in August 2010, raising over £1,200 for the Sheffield Children's Hospital. A group of skaters from the team completed the 2011 Goodwood Marathon for the NSPCC and the Bluebell Wood Children's Hospice in Sheffield. More recent charity events have concentrated on raising awareness and donations for The Homeless Period.
