= Vendetta Vixens =

Roller derby league

Vendetta Vixens Roller Derby
- Metro area: Northampton
- Country: United Kingdom
- Founded: 2011
- Teams: Vendetta Vixens All-Stars (A), B for Vendetta (B)
- Track type(s): Flat
- Website: vendetta-vixens.co.uk

Vendetta Vixens Roller Derby is a flat track roller derby league based in Northampton, England, which was founded in 2011 and played their first games the following year.

== League History ==
The name "Vendetta Vixens" is a reference to the graphic novel, V for Vendetta, written by Alan Moore, a British comic book author who also hails from Northampton. The league colours are purple and black, purple chosen specifically as it has connotations of neofeminism which is embraced by the team. They currently consist of two teams, the Vendetta Vixens All-Stars, and B for Vendetta, the B team rebranded from their previous name The Lost Girls.

The Vendetta Vixens' first public games were in the "End Of The World Series" in 2012, the precursor for what would eventually become the Five Nations Roller Derby Championships. This competition was held between six roller derby teams in central England: Milton Keynes Roller Derby (the eventual champions), Hertfordshire Roller Derby's Hell's Belles, Rebellion Roller Derby, Bedfordshire Rollergirls and Oxford Roller Derby, as well as the Vendetta Vixens.

The league hosted their first public home bout on 30 June 2012. They joined the United Kingdom Roller Derby Association in 2016.

They featured in local paper The Nenequirer where five skaters were interviewed about their experiences with roller derby to promote the sport.

== Five Nations Roller Derby Championships ==
The Vixens participated in the "End Of The World Series" in 2012, then the "Heartland Series" in 2013 and 2014, which evolved into the British Roller Derby Championships with the involvement of the United Kingdom Roller Derby Association in 2015. The championships are the largest roller derby tournament of their kind in Europe.

They took part in the inaugural British Championships in 2015, as part of the Women T4 Central South tier. In their opening game, they beat Bedfordshire Roller Derby, 333–64, followed by a loss to Hertfordshire Roller Derby's Hell's Belles, 154–267. The Vixens beat Coventry Roller Derby, 271–89, before losing to Surrey Roller Girls, 164–140.

In 2016, they were moved to Women Tier 4 East, where they were beaten by Rebellion Roller Derby, 282–93, then by Suffolk Roller Derby, 188–134, before narrowly winning against Lincolnshire Bombers Roller Derby, 153–152.

The following year, the competition was restructured and they participated in the Women's T4 Local tier. First up they faced and lost to Suffolk Roller Derby once more, 206–92, and then to Oxford Wheels of Gory Roller Derby, 228–96. Their losing streak continued and they lost their other two games: to Lincolnshire Bombers Roller Derby, 304–92; and to Wiltshire Roller Derby, 206–132.

The Vendetta Vixens remained in the same tier of the competition in 2018, beating City of Hull Roller Derby 230–123 in their first game of the championship. Next, they faced York Minxters Roller Derby and won, 229–112, followed by a loss to Suffolk Roller Derby, 218–46. Their final game was against Grimsby Roller Derby's Grim Reavers, which the Vixens won, 260–86.

There was a further restructuring of the competition for 2019 and the Vixens found themselves in the Women's T3 Regional tier. Eastbourne Roller Derby's Bourne Bombshells were their first opponents, with a win for the Vendetta Vixens, 197–120. They then faced Big Bucks High Rollers and lost, 166–125, before beating Milton Keynes Roller Derby's Concrete Cows, 235–136. Their final game of the competition ended in a win against Surrey Roller Girls 190–172.

In 2021, the British Championships rebranded as the Five Nations Roller Derby Championships.

== See also ==
- List of roller derby leagues
- Roller derby in the United Kingdom
