= SSRG =

SSRG may refer to:

- Georgian Soviet Socialist Republic
- Seaside Siren Roller Girls
- Sheffield Steel Rollergirls
- Steel Shop Recovery Group (SSRG)
- Sun State Roller Girls
