= Team ZA Roller Derby =

Representative of South Africa in Women's International Roller Derby

- Founded: 2014
- Colors: Black and gold
- Head coach: Philipp Schmid
- Manager: Barbara Plank
- Championships: 35th place at 2018 Roller Derby World Cup
- Website: www.teamzarollerderby.com

Team ZA Roller Derby represents South Africa in women's international roller derby, in events such as the Roller Derby World Cup.

== History ==
The team was first formed to compete at the 2014 Roller Derby World Cup, at which it was known as Team South Africa Roller Derby. It played a warm-up mixed scrimmage against the Texas Rollergirls, but lost all of its group stage matches and exited the competition.

At the 2018 Roller Derby World Cup, on the first day, the team lost narrowly to Greece, and then by 283 to nil to England. However, it then beat Romania and Costa Rica, recording its first ever wins in the tournament. It finished the tournament ranked 35 out of 38 teams.

== Squad ==
=== 2014 ===
Real name	Derby name
Candice Van Niekerk	Ling Vom Bot
Michelle Dosson	Booty Queen
Philippa Van Welie	Pippa
Aimee Plank	The Iron Tyrant
Emilia Domagala	Bug-Off
Samantha Scholtz	Slam-U-Well Jackson
Teri Robberts	Gazelle
Lauren Barkume	Pit Bullet
Kelly Wooldridge	Electri-Kell
Laurie Bauer	Sookie Smackhouse
Rozanne du Preeze	Betty Bone Crusher
Jeanette Venske	Sugarfists
Szerdi Nagy	Julia Seize-Her
Claire Hayward	Miss C Malice
Nic Chalmers	Coach Nic

=== 2018 ===
Number	Name
00	Samurai
000	Booty Queen
001	Bug Off
11	Nagy
1610	Kez
17	Beaten Mess
1981	Red Mist
2020	Axl Bruise
222	Trouble
313	Wrecking Bell
4	Stingray
47	Betty Bone Crusher
55	Kill Gill
7	Sookie Smackhouse
73	Mother
7530	Van Der Moseley
78	Hooligan Barbie
911	Empress Pain-guin
917	Iron Tyrant
Head coach	Philipp Schmid
Bench	Andrew Stent
