= Brighton Rockers Roller Derby =

Roller derby league

- Metro area: Brighton
- Country: England
- Founded: 2010
- Teams: Brighton Rockers (A team); Brighton Rockerbillies (B team); Brighton C-Side (C team)
- Track type(s): Flat
- Venue: The Dolphin Leisure Centre
- Affiliations: WFTDA
- Website: brightonrockers.com

Brighton Rockers Roller Derby (BRRD) is a flat track roller derby league based in Brighton in East Sussex, England. Founded in 2010, the league consists of three teams, which compete against teams from other leagues.

Brighton Rockers is a member of the Women's Flat Track Derby Association (WFTDA), and the United Kingdom Roller Derby Association.

== League History ==
The league formed in 2010 in the Lion and Lobster pub at a meeting including founder member Elli Ades (derby name Hairy Fairy), and The Mighty Mighty Bash, who came from London Rockin' Rollers.

Brighton was accepted as a member of the United Kingdom Roller Derby Association (UKRDA) in March 2012, though the league suffered a setback in July, when its kit was stolen from a member's car.

In 2013 it played in the first UKRDA Southern tournament, "Roller Rumble", in which it finished in fourth place after a narrow loss to Bristol Roller Derby.

In January 2015, Brighton Rockers entered the WFTDA Apprentice Program. The Rockers became a full member of the WFTDA in July 2017.

== League Structure ==
=== Brighton Rockers ===
Brighton Rockers is the All Stars Travel team. Consisting of a roster of twenty skaters who compete all over the world against other WFTDA-ranked teams.

=== Brighton Rockerbillies ===
Formed in 2015, Brighton Rockerbillies are the B Team of Brighton Rockers. The Rockerbillies compete against teams all over the UK and Europe.

=== Brighton C-Side ===
Formed in 2018, Brighton C-Side are the C Team of the Brighton Rockers. The C-Siders compete again challenge teams and recreational leagues in the UK.

=== Brighton Rockers All Terrain Support (BRATS) ===
This is the league's official fan club, who have their own website and produce game reports and a fanzine, Turn Left.

== WFTDA rankings ==
Season	Final ranking	Playoffs	Championship
2018	287 WFTDA	DNQ	DNQ
2019	279 WFTDA	DNQ	DNQ
2020	279 WFTDA	DNQ	DNQ

*Please note that rankings were suspended in March 2020 in light of the COVID-19 pandemic.

== British Roller Derby Championships ==
The Rockers participated in the Women T2 South tier of the British Roller Derby Championships in 2015. They faced London Rockin' Rollers, who beat them 207-141. Their next game was against Portsmouth Roller Wenches, which also ended in defeat for the Brighton side, 215-150. Their bad luck continued with a loss to Royal Windsor Roller Derby, 348-196, but the Rockers beat Seaside Siren Roller Girls in their final game of the competition, 253-175.
