= Belfast City Rockets =

Former roller derby league in Belfast, Northern Ireland

- Metro area: Belfast
- Country: Northern Ireland
- Founded: 2012
- Dissolved: 2018
- Venue: Connswater Leisure Centre
- Website: www.facebook.com/BelfastCityRockets

Belfast City Rockets (BCR) was a roller derby league based in Belfast, Northern Ireland. It was founded in 2012 and dissolved in 2018, when its members merged with Belfast Roller Derby. The league was a member of the Irish Roller Derby Association and had links to Queen's University Belfast.

== History ==
=== Formation ===
Belfast City Rockets was founded in 2012 as a second league in Belfast, after Belfast Roller Derby, which had been founded in 2010 and was the first roller derby league in Northern Ireland. The league trained and played at Connswater Leisure Centre in east Belfast. It ran a Facebook page and a website at belfastcityrockets.co.uk.

The league was linked to Queen's University Belfast through the Queen's Students' Union, which listed roller derby among its sports clubs in 2015, and many of its skaters were students.

=== Competition ===
Flat Track Stats lists the league as a womens team with no Women's Flat Track Derby Association or United Kingdom Roller Derby Association affiliation. It records 10 games in 2013-2016.

Season	Games	Won–lost
2013	1	0–1
2014	4	1–3
2015	2	0–2
2016	3	0–3

Its only win was 188-135 against Voodoo Roller Dollies on 6 September 2014. The heaviest defeat was 5-410 against Central Belters on 4 June 2016.

=== Merger ===
The league was recorded as disbanded on 1 May 2018. Belfast Roller Derby describes itself as "created from the unification of Belfast Roller Derby and the Belfast City Rockets" and is a member of the WFTDA, the UK Roller Derby Association and the Irish Roller Derby Association.

== See also ==
- Belfast Roller Derby
- Roller derby in the United Kingdom
