= ARRG =

ARRG may refer to:

- Arch Rival Rollergirls, from St. Louis, Missouri
- Auld Reekie Roller Girls, from Edinburgh in Scotland
