= Lincolnshire Bombers Roller Derby =

Roller derby league

- Metro area: Lincoln, England
- Country: United Kingdom
- Founded: 2008
- Teams: Bombshell Bruisers (A team); The Damebusters (B team)
- Track type: Flat
- Venue: Yarborough Leisure centre, Lincoln. Grantham Meres leisure centre.
- Affiliations: WFTDA
- Website: https://www.lbrd.co.uk/

Lincolnshire Bombers Roller Derby is a flat track roller derby league, based in Lincoln, England. Lincolnshire is a member of the United Kingdom Roller Derby Association (UKRDA) and the Women's Flat Track Derby Association (WFTDA).

== League History ==
Established in 2008 as the Lincolnshire Bombers Roller Girls, the league was named in homage to Lincolnshire's RAF history. It started out with five members, including long-term director and founder Emma Maher (derby name She'za Payne). Later that year, the league had grown to 25 members, enabling them to start their first roller derby season in 2009.

The Bombers were one of the founding members of the United Kingdom Roller Derby Association (UKRDA). The league remains a member of the UKRDA, but no longer has any members serving on the board of directors.

=== 2009 ===
In 2009, LBRG secured sponsorship from the band Motörhead. The deal was a two-year sponsorship that saw the team move from their traditional RAF-inspired uniforms to printed T-shirts with the "Motörhead" logo on their backs. About the sponsorship, Motörhead said: "One look at these wild women is enough to make it clear that we're a match made in hell! These girls are so mean that if they moved next door, not only would your lawn die, but they'd kick yer ass too!" The sponsorship deal also resulted in some members of LBRG dancing on stage with Motörhead at a gig in Nottingham.

In September, the Lincolnshire Bombers played away to Rainy City Roller Girls, from Oldham. The final score was 142–33 to Rainy City.

The league also hosted their own home games for the first time, styled as "The Carnival of the Strange". The event consisted of two games, the first of which was Las Ninas Muertas vs Children of the Damned (teams consisting of skaters from Lincolnshire Bombers, Auld Reekie Roller Girls, Central City Rollergirls, Glasgow Rollergirls, Leeds Roller Dolls, Middlesbrough Milk Rollers, Sheffield Steel Rollergirls, Rainy City Roller Girls, Rebellion Roller Girls and Windsor Roller Girls). The second game was the first ever open men's roller derby game in the UK.

=== 2010 ===
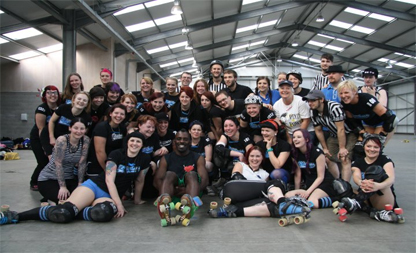
Lincolnshire Bombers at a 2010 boot camp with Quadzilla

Off the back of the Whip It film release, the Lincolnshire Bombers Roller Girls launched a successful "Be Your Own Hero" recruitment campaign. One of LBRG's biggest recruitment sessions followed.

The same year, LBRG experienced a league split, resulting in the formation of the second female roller derby league in Lincoln, the Imposters Roller Girls who lasted until 2017. Lincolnshire's 2010 season saw them play three non-tournament games, losing to Auld Reekie Roller Girls 147–20, Central City Rollergirls 130–79, and Royal Windsor Rollergirls 149–78.

Lincolnshire Bombers after the Great Yorkshire Showdown 2010

The Bombers took part in the Great Yorkshire Showdown 2010 tournament, hosted by the Leeds Roller Dolls. The event was a B-team level tournament and saw the Lincolnshire Bombers play against seven other teams from across the north of England, including Manchester Roller Derby, Liverpool Roller Birds, Newcastle Roller Girls, Middlesbrough Milk Rollers, Sheffield Steel Rollergirls, Wakey Wheeled Cats and Leeds. The tournament marked the first ever appearance of a non-A-team version of the Lincolnshire Bombers Rollergirls, as the team included skaters who had previously only played "rookie-level" challenge games. After three 30-minute games, LBRG took the top spot in the tournament, successfully claiming the first ever Great Yorkshire Showdown champion title.

=== 2018 ===
In 2018, the league updated its name to Lincolnshire Bombers Roller Derby.

== League Structure ==
The league is made up of two adult teams: the Bombshell Bruisers (A), and the Damebusters (B, currently on hiatus).

As per the WFTDA, the main league accept as members anyone who identifies as a cis woman, trans woman, intersex woman, and/or gender expansive, and is over 18 years old. They accept people with no previous skating experience into their recruitment and training programme, to give them the skills for playing roller derby.

There is also a junior league, the Bombinos, that accepts skaters from the age of 10 who can then move on to the main league as they age out of the junior section. They have had members play in the Junior roller derby world cup, including Eve Gormley (Lady McDeath) and Rachel Bell who played in an exhibition match at the adult 2018 Roller Derby World Cup.

== WFTDA ==
In September 2011 the Lincolnshire Bombers joined the WFTDA Apprentice Program. On 12 November 2011, the Lincolnshire Bomber Roller Girls played their first WFTDA qualifying game against visiting Sioux Falls Roller Dollz from South Dakota, USA. The game was a closed door bout, aimed at LBRG gaining valuable experience against a highly experienced American Team.

In June 2012, Lincolnshire were accepted as full members of the WFTDA.

=== WFTDA rankings ===
Season	Final ranking	Playoffs	Championship
2013	162 WFTDA	DNQ	DNQ
2018	325 WFTDA	DNQ	DNQ

After being ranked in 2013, Lincolnshire did not receive end-of-year rankings from the WFTDA until 2018.
