= Royal Windsor Roller Derby =

Roller derby league

- Metro area: Windsor
- Country: United Kingdom
- Founded: 2007
- Dissolved: 2023
- Teams: Who Dares Windsor (A team); B-Headers (B team)
- Track type(s): Flat
- Venue: Windsor Leisure Centre
- Affiliations: WFTDA
- Website: www.royalwindsorrollerderby.co.uk

Royal Windsor Roller Derby (RWRD) was a flat track roller derby league based in Berkshire, England. Founded in 2007 as Royal Windsor Roller Girls, RWRD was Berkshire's first roller derby league and one of the first in the UK. The league trained in Ascot and played its home games at Windsor Leisure Centre.

RWRD was a member of the United Kingdom Roller Derby Association (UKRDA) and the Women's Flat Track Derby Association (WFTDA). The team announced it had played its last game on 5 November 2023.

== League Structure ==
RWRD had two travel teams who competed with teams from other leagues:

- Who Dares Windsor (A)
- The B-Headers (B)

There were also two intra-league teams.

== League History ==
Royal Windsor Rollergirls had only five skaters and one referee when it was founded in September 2007, but grew rapidly and had 40 members by April 2010. They played their first bout in 2009, at the Wycombe Sports Centre in nearby Buckinghamshire, which was attended by more than 350 people.

The league was a founder member of the United Kingdom Roller Derby Association in 2010.

In July 2011, Royal Windsor Rollergirls joined the WFTDA Apprentice Program, and became a full member in June 2012. The league continued to be active both regionally and internationally, competing in the British Roller Derby Championships in 2015-2018 and European tournaments such as "Slip It" 2018.

Windsor created the concept of Sur5al in 2012, which is a short-form version of roller derby.

The league won the Community Club of the Year award, voted for by the public, at the fifth annual Get Berkshire Active Awards in 2017.

In October 2018, Royal Windsor Rollergirls changed their name to Royal Windsor Roller Derby.

== National Team Representation ==
The league's Head Coach, Rollin' StoneR, was Lineup Manager on the coaching team for Team England Roller Derby for the 2011 Roller Derby World Cup and the 2014 Roller Derby World Cup.

== WFTDA rankings ==
Season	Final ranking	Playoffs	Championship
2013	149 WFTDA	DNQ	DNQ
2014	173 WFTDA	DNQ	DNQ
2015	168 WFTDA	DNQ	DNQ
2016	267 WFTDA	DNQ	DNQ
2017	263 WFTDA	DNQ	DNQ
2018	199 WFTDA	DNQ	DNQ
2019	210 WFTDA*	?	?

*April 2019 was the last WFTDA game RWRD played.

**Rankings were suspended in March 2020 in light of the COVID-19 pandemic.

== Five Nations Roller Derby Championships ==
The league participated in the inaugural British Roller Derby Championships in 2015, as part of the Women T2 South tier. They won all of their games, facing up against Bristol Roller Derby, London Rockin' Rollers, Brighton Rockers Roller Derby, Seaside Siren Roller Girls, and Portsmouth Roller Wenches. This performance saw them progress to the Women T2 Playoffs 2015, where they lost to Nottingham Hellfire Harlots Roller Derby, 223-143, but won against London Rockin' Rollers, 231-141.

In 2016, they found themselves in the Women Tier 1 Premier of the competition. They lost all of their games, beaten by London Roller Derby's Brawl Saints (B), Glasgow Roller Derby, Newcastle Roller Derby, and Leeds Roller Derby.

They moved down to the Womens T2 UKRDA National tier in the restructured tournament in 2017. They had a difficult start to the competition, losing two games in a row to London Rockin' Rollers and Swansea City Roller Derby, but won their remaining three games against SWAT Roller Derby, Big Bucks High Rollers and Kent Roller Derby.

Royal Windsor Roller Derby won the silver medal in the Womens T2 UKRDA National tier in 2018. To achieve this, they faced London Roller Derby's Batter C Power (C) twice, Rebellion Roller Derby, Bath Roller Derby and SWAT Roller Derby.

In 2021, the British Championships rebranded as the Five Nations Roller Derby Championships.

== Sur5al ==
Windsor are credited with developing the concept and hosting the first roller derby Sur5al tournament in 2012. Sur5al is a short-form, one-day roller derby challenge event in which up to fifteen teams of 5 skaters compete in two-minute jams, which can't be called off, with each team playing every other team just once through the day. The format has since been used around the world.
