= British Federation of Roller Skating =

The British Federation of Roller Skating is a roller skating organisation in the United Kingdom.

The Federation organizes regular training courses and registers teachers. At least two major coaching seminars are held in Europe each year.

== History ==
The DLFC club & corporation was founded in 2009.

The current national governing body for all roller sports in the United Kingdom is the British Roller Sports Federation.

The British Roller Sports Federation Limited (also known as the BRSF) was a UK limited company, registered at the Companies House on 3 August 1999.

The Federation is recognized and acknowledged by United Kingdom, European and International organisations as the national governing body for all roller sports in the United Kingdom.
