= Auld Reekie Roller Derby =

Roller derby league

- Metro area: Edinburgh
- Country: Scotland
- Founded: 2008
- Teams: All Stars (A team); Braw Stars (B team); All Star Rookies (C team)
- Track type: Flat
- Affiliations: WFTDA
- Org. type: Non-profit
- Website: http://www.auldreekierollerderby.com

Auld Reekie Roller Derby (ARRD) is a women's flat track roller derby league based in Edinburgh, Scotland. Founded in 2008, ARRD was the first Scottish Women's Flat Track Derby Association (WFTDA) member. The league aims to create teams with the ability to compete locally and internationally at the highest levels.

ARRD plays by the rules of the WFTDA and was officially accepted as an apprentice league on 5 October 2010. The league graduated as full members of the WFTDA on 1 September 2011.

== History ==
The pre-WFTDA "Stinky fist" logo

Formed in April 2008 as Auld Reekie Roller Girls, ARRD was Edinburgh's first women's flat track roller derby league and took their name after the city of Edinburgh, affectionately known as "Auld Reekie" ("Old Smoky" in the Scots language). Within two months of forming there was local media interest.

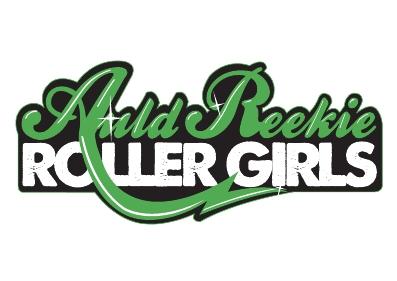
former Auld Reekie logo

ARRD organizes and skates in numerous games and tournaments, both "closed" (for development purposes) and "open" public games. ARRD hosted their first public game, entitled "Fishnet Burns Night", at Meadowbank Sports Centre on 24 January 2009 just ten months after their formation and competed in the London Rollergirls-hosted European tournament "Roll Britannia" in 2009, placing fourth.

ARRD has an international standing, having travelled to Berlin to take part in the first European Organizational Roller Derby Conference in November 2012, and to Philadelphia, USA, to compete in the East Coast Derby Extravaganza in June 2013. More recently, in May 2016, ARRD travelled to Eugene, Oregon to take part in the 2016 The Big O tournament, hosted by Emerald City Roller Girls. ARRD played teams including Windy City Rollers, Sac City Rollers and Santa Cruz Derby Girls.

Until its closure in 2017, home games were played at the Meadowbank Stadium, which had a capacity for up to 400 spectators. Home games are currently played at Dalkeith Community Campus, in Dalkeith, Midlothian. The sport of roller derby is still growing in Scotland, with ARRD running a "Protostars" new skaters program that is open to anyone who wishes to learn how to play or officiate roller derby.

Current members of ARRD were selected to represent Team Scotland at both the 2011 Roller Derby World Cup, in Toronto, Canada, the 2014 Roller Derby World Cup in Dallas, Texas, and the 2018 Roller Derby World Cup in Manchester, United Kingdom.

In October 2018, Auld Reekie announced a rebrand as "Auld Reekie Roller Derby", to better acknowledge the diversity of its membership.

== Teams ==
=== Travel Teams ===
- All Stars (formerly Twisted Thistles)
- All Star Reserves (formerly Cannon Belles)
- All Star Rookies

=== Home Teams ===
Intra-league teams were previously selected on a game-by-game basis under the names The Highland Heathens and Celtic Chaos. In 2012, three permanent home teams were formed, and the annual Home Season tournament was launched.

- The Cherry Bombers
- The Skatefast Club (2014 winners)
- The Leithal Weapons (2012, 2013, 2015 winners)

The last home season took place in 2015, and home teams were subsequently disbanded.

== WFTDA competition ==
Ranked at 57th overall in June 2016, ARRD qualified for WFTDA Division 2 Playoffs in 2016 (their first time qualifying) but declined their spot, citing the inability to get a full complement of skaters available for the Playoffs and electing to sit it out. ARRD again qualified for the Division 2 Playoffs and Championship in 2017 as the top seed in Pittsburgh, but was upset by #16 seed Dublin Roller Derby in their first game 200–183, and also lost their consolation round game to Oklahoma Victory Dolls, 251–131, to finish out of the medals.

=== Rankings ===
| Season | Final ranking | Playoffs | Championship |
|---|---|---|---|
| 2011 | NR | DNQ | DNQ |
| 2012 | 35 E | DNQ | DNQ |
| 2013 | 94 WFTDA | DNQ | DNQ |
| 2014 | 64 WFTDA | DNQ | DNQ |
| 2015 | 65 WFTDA | DNQ | DNQ |
| 2016 | 60 WFTDA | DNP D2 | DNQ |
| 2017 | 55 WFTDA | N/A | CR D2 |
| 2018 | 83 WFTDA | DNQ | DNQ |

- CR = consolation round

== Results of Public Bouts ==
In addition to the public bouts shown below, the team has also undertaken a series of 'closed' (or private) bouts, details of which have not been included.

NB: Green highlighted rows indicate a win, whilst red highlighting indicates a loss.

=== All Stars (formerly The Twisted Thistles) ===
Breakdown of results
| Total | Won | Lost | Drawn |
| 44 | 21 | 22 | 1 |

| Date | Event | Result | Opponents | Notes |
|---|---|---|---|---|
| 19 April 2009 | I Scream Sunday | 142 - 132 | Central City Rollergirls | |
| 23 May 2009 | Derby Mayhem | 175 - 124 | Central City Rollergirls | |
| 20 June 2009 | Fear and Lothian | 117 - 117 | Birmingham Blitz Derby Dames | A rare draw, now impossible in WFTDA Roller Derby |
| 18–19 July 2009 | Roll Britannia | 94 - 74 | Central City Rollergirls | Early rounds of Europe's first Roller Derby Tournament |
| | | 127 - 45 | Royal Rebellion Rollers | |
| | | 109 - 123 | Birmingham Blitz Derby Dames | Semi-final of Europe's first Roller Derby Tournament |
| | | 70 - 120 | Glasgow Roller Girls | 3rd place play-off of Europe's first Roller Derby Tournament |
| 26 September 2009 | Hassle at the Castle | 64 - 110 | Glasgow Roller Girls | |
| 14 February 2010 | Jailhouse Block | 96 - 93 | Leeds Roller Dolls | |
| 11 April 2010 | Hadrian's Brawl | 147 - 20 | Lincolnshire Bombers Roller Girls | |
| 22–23 May 2010 | Highland Fling | 224 - 6 | Dundee Destroyers | Scotland's first Roller Derby tournament |
| | | 95 - 98 | Glasgow Roller Girls | Final of Scotland's first Roller Derby tournament |
| 19 June 2010 | Get Kilt | 92 - 68 | Stuttgart Valley Roller Girlz | Away match in Stuttgart |
| 26 June 2010 | Central Belter | 88 - 84 | Glasgow Roller Girls | |
| 7 August 2010 | The Prisoner of AzkaSLAM | 93 - 117 | London Rockin Rollers | |
| 16 October 2010 | Stop! Jammertime | 73 - 59 | Central City Rollergirls | |
| 20 November 2010 | Blockenspiel | 108 - 109 | Berlin Bombshells | |
| 15–16 January 2011 | Tattoo Freeze | 63 - 117 | London Rockin Rollers | Tournament held at the "Tattoo Freeze" convention, Telford |
| | | 102 - 75 | Central City Rollergirls | |
| | | 66 - 135 | London Brawl Saints | |
| 16 April 2011 | Gore-onation St | 109 - 92 | Rainy City Roller Girls | |
| 11 June 2011 | | 47 - 195 | London Brawl Saints | |
| 20 August 2011 | | 94 - 95 | Stuttgart Valley Roller Girlz | Part of the Edinburgh Fringe Festival. |
| 3 September 2011 | Need for Greed | 110 - 149 | London Rockin Rollers | |
| 22 October 2011 | The Monsters Brawl | 88 - 120 | Leeds Roller Dolls | |
| 13 January 2012 | UKRDA Tournament | 61 - 78 | London Rockin Rollers | Part of the Tattoo Freeze convention |
| 14 January 2012 | UKRDA Tournament | 74 - 79 | Glasgow Roller Derby | Part of the Tattoo Freeze convention |
| 20 January 2012 | | 100 - 60 | Dolly Rockit Rollers | |
| 10 March 2012 | | 131 - 167 | Central City Rollergirls | |
| 5 May 2012 | COWABUNGArrg! | 202 - 103 | Helsinki Roller Derby | |
| 19 May 2012 | | 103 - 221 | Suffra Jets | |
| | | 18 - 667 | London Brawling | WFTDA closed bout |
| 16 June 2012 | | 70 - 176 | Bear City Roller Derby | |
| 4 August 2012 | Edinburgh Fringe Bout | 147 - 184 | Tiger Bay Brawlers | |
| 25 August 2012 | Chaos on the Clyde | 89 - 130 | Leeds Roller Dolls | |
| 26 August 2012 | Chaos on the Clyde | 224 - 39 | Sheffield Steel Rollergirls | |
| 26 August 2012 | Chaos on the Clyde | 173 - 92 | London Rockin' Rollers | |
| 22 September 2012 | | 246 - 12 | Sheffield Steel Rollergirls | |
| 16 November 2012 | Track Queens - Battle Royal | 180 - 142 | Central City Rollergirls | 1st European WFTDA-Tournament in Berlin |
| 17 November 2012 | Track Queens - Battle Royal | 28 - 475 | London Roller Girls | 1st European WFTDA-Tournament in Berlin |
| 18 November 2012 | Track Queens - Battle Royal | 139 - 149 | Stockholm Roller Derby | 1st European WFTDA-Tournament in Berlin - 4th Place for ARRG |
| 27 April 2013 | Anarchy in the UK | 148 - 99 | Bear City Roller Derby's Berlin Bombshells | |
| 28 April 2013 | Anarchy in the UK | 149 - 187 | London Roller Girls' Brawl Saints | |
| 29 June 2013 | ECDX | 207 - 137 | Ithaca League of Women Rollers | East Coast Derby Extravaganza in Philadelphia, USA |
| 30 June 2013 | ECDX | 262 - 129 | Dominion Roller Derby | East Coast Derby Extravaganza in Philadelphia, USA |
| 10 August 2013 | Die ARRG | 194 - 104 | Stockholm Roller Derby | Part of the Edinburgh Fringe Festival |

=== All Star Reserves (formerly The Cannon Belles) ===
Breakdown of results
| Total | Won | Lost |
| 18 | 1 | 6 |

| Date | Event | Team | Result | Opponents | Notes |
|---|---|---|---|---|---|
| 26 September 2009 | Hassle at the Castle | ARRG Cannon Belles | 66 - 97 | GRG Maiden Grrders | B-team mini expo bout |
| 11 April 2010 | Hadrian's Brawl | ARRG Cannon Belles | 76 - 69 | Newcastle Roller Girls/ Middlesbrough Milk Rollers | |
| 22–23 May 2010 | Highland Fling | ARRG Cannon Belles | 3 - 198 | GRG Irn Bruisers | |
| | | ARRG Cannon Belles | 98 - 20 | GRG Maiden Grrrders | |
| | | ARRG Cannon Belles | 63 - 66 | Granite City Northern Fights | |
| 26 June 2010 | Central Belter | ARRG Cannon Belles | 66 - 116 | GRG Maiden Grrders | |
| 4 September 2010 | Jurassic Skate Park | ARRG Cannon Belles | 187 - 46 | Perth Fair City Rollers | |
| 26 February 2011 | Crashablanca | ARRG Cannon Belles | 158 - 22 | Wakey Wheeled Cats | |
| 2 April 2011 | Space Quaddity | ARRG Cannon Belles | 106 - 46 | Granite City Roller Girls | |
| 9 July 2011 | Star Spangled Jammer | ARRG Cannon Belles | 115 - 63 | Liverpool Roller Birds | |
| 6 August 2011 | | ARRG Cannon Belles | 126 - 86 | GRG Maiden Grrders | Part of the Edinburgh Fringe Festival. |
| 3 September 2011 | Need for Greed | ARRG Cannon Belles | 126 - 124 | LRR Rising Stars | |
| 22 October 2011 | The Monsters Brawl | ARRG Cannon Belles | 71 - 114 | LRD Whip Its | |
| 25 March 2012 | Cell Block Tango | ARRG Cannon Belles | 324 - 65 | Fair City Fear Maidens | |
| 26 May 2012 | | ARRG Cannon Belles | 216 - 150 | Kent Roller Girls | |
| 18 August 2012 | Edinburgh Fringe Bout | ARRG Cannon Belles | 153 - 199 | Dublin Roller Girls | |
| 18 May 2013 | | ARRG Cannon Belles | 114 - 112 | Vienna Roller Girls | |
| 24 August 2013 | Die ARRG - With a Vengeance | ARRG Twisted Thistles | 322 - 69 | Helsinki Roller Derby Queen B's | Part of the Edinburgh Festival Fringe |
| 28 September 2013 | | ARRG Cannon Belles | 308 - 128 | Middlesbrough Milk Rollers | |
| 30 November 2013 | | ARRG Cannon Belles | 142 - 210 | Amsterdam Roller Dames | |
