= Belgium national roller derby team =

National roller derby team for Belgium

Team Belgium Roller Derby
- Founded: 2013; 13 years ago
- Head coach: Dark Pistol; She-Lock; Nana; Bridge Van De Camp
- Championships: 8th place at 2025 Roller Derby World Cup

Team Belgium Roller Derby represents Belgium in international roller derby events under the WFTDA ruleset. The team is governed by the Belgian National Roller Derby Association and is composed of skaters of several Belgian leagues. They first competed in the 2014 Roller Derby World Cup and have competed in every World Cup since.

== Results ==
=== 2014 ===
Reached the elimination rounds after winning from Greece and Italy, but losing to Australia.

=== 2018 ===
Won against Korea and Italy but lost to Argentina and Germany in the preliminary rounds. Finished the tournament in 16th place after the last classification game with a loss from Mexico.

=== 2025 ===
In the preliminary rounds, defeated Jewish Roller Derby and Finland and lost to England. Lost to USA Roller Derby in the quarter final, eventually placing 8th.

== Lineups ==
=== 2025 team roster ===
Number	Name
03	Knapy
06	MC
10	Buu (Note: Named as a member of the Most Valuable Team as chosen by the announcers.)
102	Saramity Jane
12	Ninon
123	Check
13	Queen LaQueefa
1957	Batsmash
27	Gillis
30	Poppers
311	Mad
394	C
5	Wildcard
51	Rose Well
537	L'Enroule
55	Chaton
589	Pulp
6	Queen Yo'Seen
8	Macha
89	Hipshot
91	May(t)hem
934	Tinker

=== 2025 Bench Staff ===
- Dark Pistol
- She-Lock
- Nana
- Bridge Van De Camp
