= United Kingdom Roller Derby Association =

Former governing body of roller derby in the UK

- Sport: Roller derby
- Founded: 2010
- Folded: 2021
- Country: United Kingdom
- Last champion: London Rockin' Rollers
- Website: ukrda.org.uk

The United Kingdom Roller Derby Association (UKRDA) was the member-led National Association for roller derby in the UK, with the aim of promoting and lobbying for the sport. The association was formed in 2008 but formalised in 2010 with 14 member leagues and in February 2011, it was recognised by the British Roller Sports Federation.

In June 2021, an EGM was held to discuss the closure of the association due to inadequate support for the organisation's running. It was disbanded shortly thereafter.

The UKRDA had a cooperative relationship with the Women's Flat Track Derby Association (WFTDA), encouraging its members to also become members of the WFTDA, and recognised the WFTDA Rules of Flat Track Roller Derby. Membership of the association was open to any UK roller derby league who met their criteria as long as all competing skaters met the WFTDA or Men's Roller Derby Association Gender Policy and were at least 18 years old on an adult team, and up to and including 17 years old on a junior team.

== Mission statement ==
The United Kingdom Roller Derby Association (UKRDA) exists to lobby for and promote the sport of roller derby in the UK. We aim to help drive the growth, expertise and recognition of the sport, whilst supporting and encouraging our members to develop and grow individually into strong, athletic leagues.

== Original member leagues ==
In June 2010, the UKRDA was formally established and membership was granted to the following leagues.

League	Location	Country
Auld Reekie Roller Girls	Edinburgh	Scotland
Birmingham Blitz Dames	Birmingham, West Midlands	England
Central City Rollergirls	Birmingham, West Midlands	England
Glasgow Roller Girls	Glasgow	Scotland
Granite City Roller Girls	Aberdeen	Scotland
Leeds Roller Dolls	Leeds, West Yorkshire	England
Lincolnshire Bombers Roller Girls	Lincoln, Lincolnshire	England
London Rockin' Rollers	London	England
London Rollergirls	London	England
Middlesbrough Milk Rollers	Middlesbrough, North Yorkshire	England
Rebellion Roller Derby	Bedford, Bedfordshire	England
Romsey Town Rollerbillies	Cambridge, Cambridgeshire	England
Royal Windsor Rollergirls	Windsor, Berkshire	England
Sheffield Steel Rollergirls	Sheffield, South Yorkshire	England

== Membership as of June 2021 ==
The organisation's membership list was last updated in June 2021, shortly before it disbanded.

League	Location	Country	Admitted
Auld Reekie Roller Derby	Edinburgh	Scotland	June 2010
Bath Roller Derby	Bath, Somerset	England	5 June 2015
Belfast Roller Derby	Belfast	Northern Ireland	26 May 2012
Big Bucks High Rollers	High Wycombe, Buckinghamshire	England	17 September 2012
Birmingham Blitz Dames	Birmingham, West Midlands	England	June 2010
Borderland Brawlers Roller Derby	Peterborough/Stamford/Rutland	England	19 June 2017
Bridgend Roller Derby	Bridgend	Wales	1 October 2016
Brighton Rockers Roller Derby	Brighton, East Sussex	England	3 March 2012
Bristol Roller Derby	Bristol	England	14 December 2012
Cambridge Rollerbillies	Cambridge, Cambridgeshire	England	1 June 2010
Central City Roller Derby	Birmingham, West Midlands	England	June 2010
Cornwall Roller Derby	Newquay and Penzance, Cornwall	England	23 April 2016
Crash Test Brummies	Birmingham, West Midlands	England	7 December 2012
Croydon Roller Derby	Croydon, South London	England	20 February 2015
Dare Valley Vixens Roller Derby	Abercynon	Wales	3 July 2016
Dolly Rockit Rollers	Leicester, Leicestershire	England	13 September 2011
Dundee Roller Derby	Dundee	Scotland	1 July 2013
Durham Roller Derby	Durham, County Durham	England	5 March 2018
Eastbourne Roller Derby	Eastbourne, East Sussex	England	1 December 2013
Furness Firecrackers	Barrow-in-Furness, Cumbria	England	24 July 2015
Glasgow Roller Derby	Glasgow	Scotland	June 2010
Granite City Roller Derby	Aberdeen	Scotland	1 January 2011
Halifax Bruising Banditas	Halifax, West Yorkshire	England	1 October 2013
Hereford Roller Derby	Hereford, Herefordshire	England	10 January 2013
Hertfordshire Roller Derby	Hemel Hempstead, Hertfordshire	England	8 April 2016
Hulls Angels Roller Derby	Kingston-upon-Hull, East Riding of Yorkshire	England	5 October 2012
Kent Men's Roller Derby	Herne Bay, Kent	England	5 March 2018
Kent Roller Derby	Kent	England	6 January 2012
Leeds Roller Derby	Leeds, West Yorkshire	England	1 November 2011
Lincolnshire Bombers Roller Derby	Lincoln, Lincolnshire	England	June 2010
Liverpool Roller Birds	Liverpool	England	28 January 2015
London Rockin' Rollers	London	England	June 2010
London Roller Derby	London	England	June 2010
Manchester Roller Derby	Manchester	England	24 October 2013
Mansfield Roller Derby	Mansfield	England	18 May 2016
Middlesbrough Roller Derby	Middlesbrough, North Yorkshire	England	June 2010
Milton Keynes Roller Derby	Milton Keynes, Buckinghamshire	England	1 May 2014
Newcastle Roller Derby	Newcastle-upon-Tyne, Tyne and Wear	England	15 November 2011
New Town Roller Derby	Livingston	Scotland	19 October 2017
North Cheshire Victory Rollers	Northwich, Cheshire	England	31 March 2016
North Devon Roller Derby	Bideford, North Devon	England	5 March 2018
North Wales Roller Derby	Flint, Clwyd	Wales	28 July 2017
Nottingham Hellfire Harlots Roller Derby	Nottingham, Nottinghamshire	England	1 December 2011
Oxford Wheels of Gory	Oxford, Oxfordshire	England	19 June 2017
Oxford Roller Derby	Oxford, Oxfordshire	England	6 January 2014
Orkney Roller Derby	Orkney	Scotland	19 October 2017
Plymouth City Roller Derby	Plymouth, Devon	England	13 October 2014
Portsmouth Roller Wenches	Portsmouth	England	2 January 2014
Preston Roller Derby	Preston, Lancashire	England	24 February 2015
Rainy City Roller Derby	Manchester, Greater Manchester	England	12 March 2012
Reaper Roller Derby	Swansea	Wales	17 March 2013
Rebellion Roller Derby	Milton Keynes, Buckinghamshire	England	1 November 2011
Red, White and Bruise Rollers	RAF Lakenheath, West Suffolk	England	1 June 2015
Roller Derby Leicester	Leicester	England	19 October 2014
Royal Windsor Roller Derby	Windsor, Berkshire	England	June 2010
Severn Roller Torrent	Gloucester, Gloucestershire	England	19 April 2013
Sheffield Steel Roller Derby	Sheffield, South Yorkshire	England	June 2010
Southern Discomfort Roller Derby	London	England	20 June 2015
South West Angels of Terror	Devon and Somerset	England	26 November 2013
Spa Town Roller Derby	Harrogate, North Yorkshire	England	28 March 2016
Surrey Roller Boys	Guildford, Surrey	England	2014
Swansea City Roller Derby	Swansea	Wales	6 May 2014
The Inhuman League	Sheffield, South Yorkshire	England	19 April 2013
Tiger Bay Brawlers	Cardiff	Wales	8 July 2011
Teesside Skate Invaders	Teesside	England	30 August 2017
Vendetta Vixens	Northampton, Northamptonshire	England	10 June 2015
Wakey Wheeled Cats Roller Derby	Wakefield, West Yorkshire	England	14 May 2018
Wiltshire Roller Derby	Swindon, Wiltshire	England	13 January 2015
Wirral Roller Derby	Wirral, Merseyside	England	25 November 2013
Wolverhampton Honour Rollers	Wolverhampton	England	5 May 2014
York Minxters Roller Derby	York, North Yorkshire	England	3 July 2016

== Previous members ==
League	Location	Country	Admitted	Disbanded
Basingstoke Bullets Roller Derby	Basingstoke, Hampshire	England	7 January 2015	28 October 2017
Cardiff Roller Collective	Cardiff	Wales	9 May 2012	
Fierce Valley Roller Derby		Scotland	24 October 2013	31 December 2017
Haunted City Rollers	Derby, Derbyshire	England	28 November 2012	1 January 2018
Hot Wheel Roller Derby	Leeds, West Yorkshire	England	1 July 2013	19 December 2016
Killa Hurtz Roller Derby	Chelmsford, Essex	England	5 March 2018	
Nottingham Roller Derby	Nottingham, Nottinghamshire	England	22 March 2015	
NPT Roller Derby	Neath	Wales	9 June 2013	31 October 2020
Ponty Pirate Derby Dames	Pontypridd	Wales	9 June 2013	
Seaside Siren Roller Girls	Southend-on-Sea, Essex	England	17 June 2012	13 June 2018
Norfolk Roller Derby	Norwich, Norfolk	England	17 March 2013	
