= Team England (roller derby) =

National roller derby team for England

England Roller Derby
- Founded: 2011
- Colors: Red, white, black and charcoal grey
- Head coach: Ballistic Whistle; Barry Fight; Rollin' Stoner
- Championships: 3rd place at 2011 Roller Derby World Cup
- Broadcasters: Derby News Network
- Website: teamenglandrollerderby.com

England Roller Derby represents England in women's international roller derby, at events such as the Roller Derby World Cup. The team was first formed to compete at the 2011 Roller Derby World Cup in Toronto, Canada, and competed in the 2014 Roller Derby World Cup in Dallas, USA and the 2018 Roller Derby World Cup in Manchester, England. In 2025 they finished 3rd in the World Cup held in Insbruk, Austria.

== Results ==
=== 2011 ===
Finished the tournament in third place, losing by 161 points to 90 to Team Canada in the semifinal, but beating Team Australia by 203 points to 85 in the third-place playoff. Before the event, The Guardian noted that the team was one of the three favourites, with Canada and Team USA, to reach the final.

=== 2014 ===
Finished the tournament in second place, losing by 291 points to 105 to Team USA in the final.

=== 2018 ===
Finished the tournament in fourth place, losing by 173 points to 147 points to Team Canada in the semifinal.

=== 2025 ===
Finished 3rd in the world cup held in Innsbruck Austria. They beat France to win the bronze medal.

== Lineups ==
=== 2011 team roster ===
Six tryout sessions were organised for prospective skaters, and this enabled the coaches to draw up a shortlist of forty. They were invited to attend a final tryout, from which the final roster of twenty was selected. The final line-up was announced in August 2011; more than half the skaters selected for the team were from the London Rollergirls. (league affiliations listed as of at the time of the announcement)

Number	Name	League
18	Dee-Mise	Rainy City Rollergirls
138	el VISIOUS	Hellfire Harlots
10	Feral Fairy	Leeds Roller Dolls
04	Fox Sake	London Rollergirls
33	Frightning Bolt	London Rollergirls
1984	Grievous Bodily Charm	London Rollergirls
82	Hustle Her	Central City Rollergirls
101	Jack Attack	London Rockin' Rollers
666	Lucy	London Rollergirls
9	Kamikaze Kitten	London Rollergirls
75	Metallikat	London Rollergirls
6	Missy Rascal (Vice-Captain)	Rainy City Rollergirls
900	Ninjette	London Rollergirls
.357	Raw Heidi	London Rollergirls
22	Rogue Runner	Dolly Rockit Rollers
888	Shaolynn Scarlett	London Rollergirls
13	Stefanie Mainey (Captain)	London Rollergirls
108	The Dalai Harmer	London Rollergirls
66	The Mighty Mighty Bash	London Rockin' Rollers
68	Vagablonde	London Rollergirls
16	Violet Attack	Birmingham Blitz Dames

=== 2011 coaching staff ===
- Ballistic Whistle, London Rollergirls
- Barry Fight, Central City Rollergirls
- Rollin' Stoner, Royal Windsor Rollergirls

=== 2014 team roster ===
Initial tryout sessions for the Team England training squad 2014 were held in both Manchester and London. Prospective skaters were also invited to submit video tryouts if unable to attend the initial sessions. Shortlisted individuals were then invited to a second tryout session in Birmingham from which the final training squad would be selected. The final training squad line-up was announced in January 2014.

Name	League
Betty Swollox	London Rockin' Rollers
Bloxie Blackout	Tiger Bay Brawlers
Dos Santos	Tiger Bay Brawlers
Ella Storey	Middlesbrough Milk Rollers
Fay Roberts	Rainy City Roller Girls
Frightning Bolt	London Rollergirls
Goregasm	London Rollergirls
Grievous Bodily Charm	London Rollergirls
Hell Vetica Black	London Rollergirls
Holly Hotrod	Sheffield Steel Roller Girls
Jen Sykes	London Rollergirls
Lucy	London Rollergirls
Kamikaze Kitten	London Rollergirls
Kid Block	Tiger Bay Brawlers
Kitty Decapitate	London Rollergirls
Lexi Lightspeed	London Rollergirls
Lorrae Evans	London Rollergirls
Missy Rascal	Rainy City Rollergirls
Olivia Coupe	London Rollergirls
Pip Gray	Tiger Bay Brawlers
Raw Heidi	London Rollergirls
ReLisa Kracken	London Rollergirls
Rogue Runner	Dolly Rockit Rollers
Shaolynn Scarlett (captain)	London Rollergirls
Sophia Ann Loathing	London Rollergirls
Stefanie Mainey (vice-captain)	London Rollergirls
Terri Sudron	Middlesbrough Milk Rollers
Total Frey-hem	London Rollergirls
Trisha Smackanawa	Dublin Roller Girls
Union Jack U Up	Nashville Roller Girls
Vic Tori Bee	Manchester Roller Derby

=== 2014 coaching staff ===
- Ballistic Whistle, London Rollergirls
- Stefanie Mainey, London Rollergirls
- Rollin' Stoner, Royal Windsor Rollergirls

=== 2018 team roster ===
Initial tryout sessions for the England Roller Derby training squad 2018 were held in both Oldham and Haywards Heath in August 2016. Prospective skaters were also invited to submit video tryouts if unable to attend the initial sessions. Shortlisted individuals were then invited to a second tryout session in Birmingham in October 2016 from which the final training squad would be selected. The final training squad line-up was announced in October 2016. The final roster for the tournament was announced in December 2017 (indicated below with *).

Number	Name	League
666	Alex Valentine*	Rainy City Roller Derby
12	Alex Wilde*	Rainy City Roller Derby
105	Becky Ruckus	Liverpool Roller Birds
369	Carley McAdam	London Rollergirls
4	Delta Strike*	Bristol Roller Derby
7	Ella Storey*	Middlesbrough Milk Rollers
11	Fay Roberts*	Rainy City Roller Derby
38	Fayetal Blonde	Rainy City Roller Derby
8	Fisher	Rainy City Roller Derby
17	Florence the Machine	London Rollergirls
8008	Gaz*	London Rollergirls
308	GG Hardy	Charm City Roller Girls
1971	Ho Chee	London Rollergirls
101	Jack Attack*	London Rollergirls
129	Just Jess*	London Rollergirls
84	Katie Hellvetica Black (vice-captain)*	London Rollergirls
40	Kid Block*	London Rollergirls
7	Kristen Lee*	London Rollergirls
55	Lexi Lightspeed	London Rollergirls
314	Lucy	Newcastle Roller Girls
6955	Menace*	Rainy City Roller Derby
6	Missy Rascal*	Rainy City Roller Derby
3	Onyeka Igwe*	London Rollergirls
419	Philly*	Rainy City Roller Derby
6	Rammit	London Rollergirls
22	Rogue Runner*	London Rollergirls
888	Shaolynn Scarlett (captain)*	London Rollergirls
13	Stefanie Mainey*	London Rollergirls
86	Terri Sudron*	Middlesbrough Milk Rollers
42	Trisha Smackanawa*	London Rollergirls
19	Woo	Central City Rollergirls

=== 2018 coaching staff ===
- Tomi "Illbilly" Lang, Southern Discomfort
- Shane Aisbett, Southern Discomfort
