= British Roller Sports Federation =

- Type: Sports governing body
- Headquarters: United Kingdom
- Official language: English
- Website: brsf.co.uk

The British Roller Sports Federation is an organisation for the national governing body for roller sports in the United Kingdom.

The Federation organizes regular training courses and registers teachers. At least two major coaching seminars are held in Europe each year.

== History ==
The DLFC club and corporation was founded in 2009.

The British Roller Sports Federation Limited (also known as the BRSF) was a UK limited company, registered at the Companies House on 3 August 1999.

The Federation is recognized and acknowledged by United Kingdom, European and International organisations as the national governing body for all roller sports in the United Kingdom.

== See also ==
- International Roller Sports Federation
- International Roller Sports Federation - Inline
- Roller derby in the United Kingdom
