= Newcastle Roller Derby =

Roller derby league

- Metro area: Newcastle-upon-Tyne
- Country: England
- Founded: 2009
- Teams: Canny Belters (A team); Whippin Hinnies (B team); North Cs (C team)
- Track type: Flat
- Venue: Walker Activity Dome
- Affiliations: WFTDA
- Website: www.newcastlerollerderby.co.uk

Newcastle Roller Derby (UK) is a flat track roller derby league from Newcastle upon Tyne, UK. The league is a member of both the United Kingdom Roller Derby Association (UKRDA) and the Women's Flat Track Derby Association (WFTDA), and plays by the WFTDA ruleset.

== History ==
Newcastle Roller Girls was established in 2009 by Claire Byrne (Brie Larceny). The league has three teams: the Canny Belters (A team), the Whippin' Hinnies (B team) and the North Cs (C team). The league follows the WFTDA gender statement. Home games are played at the Walker Dome and Benfield Sports Centre in Newcastle upon Tyne.

In March 2010, the team featured in a BBC Look North report on roller derby in Tyneside. They were featured in a BBC article on roller derby in the northeast in the same year.

Their first bout was away at Hadrian's Brawl on 11 April 2010, playing against the B team from the Auld Reekie Roller Girls at the Meadowbank Sports Centre in Edinburgh. Their first home bout, Flog on the Tyne, was against Granite City Roller Girls on 5 March 2011 at The Lightfoot Centre (now The Walker Activity Dome) in Walker, Newcastle. The home team won by 113 to 63.

In November 2011, Newcastle Roller Girls joined the UK Roller Derby Association. In October 2013, they were accepted as a member of the Women's Flat Track Derby Association Apprentice Programme. Newcastle became a full WFTDA member league in July 2014.

In February 2020, the league rebranded from Newcastle Roller Girls to Newcastle Roller Derby.

== National Team Representation ==
In 2011, Newcastle player Lucy Tyler (derby name Lucy) made the Team England (roller derby) training squad for the 2011 Roller Derby World Cup and was selected for the final world cup roster of 20. She made the training squad for both the 2014 and the 2018 Roller Derby World Cup.

Anita B Nasty was part of the Team Scotland Roller Derby squad for the 2018 Roller Derby World Cup.

== Associated teams ==
An associated men's team was founded in June 2011, Tyne and Fear Roller Derby. A mixed-gender team, Tyne e' Belters, includes members of Newcastle Roller Girls. In 2015 Newcastle Junior Roller Derby was established, a junior roller derby squad, and they made their debut during the half time interval of the British Roller Derby Championships game on 2 April 2016.

== EuroClash tournament ==
In 2017 and 2018 Newcastle Roller Derby hosted EuroClash - a two-day, invitational, international tournament. The 2017 event also featured an exhibition bout between Team Ireland Roller Derby and Team Scotland Roller Derby, which was won 209-128 by the Scots.

A third EuroClash tournament was scheduled for 2020 but was postponed due to the COVID-19 pandemic.

Year	Participating Teams
2017	Auld Reekie Roller Derby, Bear City Roller Derby, Central City Roller Derby, Dublin Roller Derby, Leeds Roller Derby, Middlesbrough Roller Derby, Newcastle Roller Derby, Paris Roller Derby, Tiger Bay Brawlers.
2018	Auld Reekie Roller Derby, Birmingham Blitz Dames, Dock City Rollers, Dublin Roller Derby, Middlesbrough Roller Derby, Newcastle Roller Derby, Steel City Roller Derby, Tiger Bay Brawlers.

== WFTDA rankings ==
Season	Final ranking	Playoffs	Championship
2014	167 WFTDA	DNQ	DNQ
2015	135 WFTDA	DNQ	DNQ
2016	76 WFTDA	DNQ	DNQ
2017	90 WFTDA	DNQ	DNQ
2018	74 WFTDA	DNQ	DNQ
2019	136 WFTDA	DNQ	DNQ
2020	138 WFTDA	DNQ	DNQ

*Please note that rankings were suspended in March 2020 in light of the pandemic.

Preceded by New competition	British Roller Derby Championships Tier 2 Champions; 2015	Succeeded by Birmingham Blitz Dames

Preceded by New competition	British Roller Derby Championships Tier 1 Champions; 2016	Succeeded by Middlesbrough Roller Derby
