= Middlesbrough Roller Derby =

Roller derby league

- Metro area: Middlesbrough, England
- Country: United Kingdom
- Founded: September 2007
- Track type: Flat
- Affiliations: WFTDA
- Org. type: Non-profit
- Website: Official website

Middlesbrough Roller Derby (MRD) is a flat track roller derby league based in Middlesbrough, England. Formerly known as the Middlesbrough Milk Rollers (MMR), the league competes internationally and is a full member of the Women's Flat Track Derby Association (WFTDA) and the United Kingdom Roller Derby Association (UKRDA).

== History ==
In September 2007, inspired by the London Rollergirls, Natalie Boxall (derby name Germaine Leer) and Karen Slater (Bon Sleaze) founded the league under the name the Middlesbrough Milk Rollers. This made them the first roller derby league in the North East of England.

They hosted the Northern EXPOsure roller derby exposition games on 19 September 2009, with commentary by Jet from Gladiators, which also featured Leeds Roller Dolls, Central City Roller Girls and Severn Roller Torrent. As well as taking part in bootcamps, bouts, and guest skating for other leagues, MMR also competed in the London Rollergirls' European tournament "Roll Britannia" in 2009 as part of the mixed team 'Royal Rebel Rollers'. This team was made up of skaters from Middlesbrough, Rebellion Rollergirls, and Windsor Rollergirls.

Former Middlesbrough Milk Rollers logo

In February 2012 the team received a lottery-funded Sport England grant, making them the first roller derby league in the UK to receive one.

The Milk Rollers took first place in the Great Yorkshire Showdown tournament in July 2012. On 22 September 2012, the league launched their B Team in a closed bout against the Norfolk Brawds, their first open bout being against the Newcastle Roller Girls Whippin' Hinnies.

Middlesbrough Roller Derby plays by the rules of the Women's Flat Track Derby Association (WFTDA) and is a member of the UK Roller Derby Association (UKRDA). In April 2013, Middlesbrough was accepted as a member of the WFTDA Apprentice Program. Middlesbrough became a full WFTDA member in July 2014.

In March 2017, the league announced a rebrand as Middlesbrough Roller Derby.

== National Team Representation ==
Ella Storey and Terri Sudron from the league have represented Team England at both the 2014 Roller Derby World Cup and 2018 Roller Derby World Cup.

== WFTDA competition ==
Middlesbrough qualified for the Division 2 Playoffs and Championship in 2017 as the sixth seed in Pittsburgh, but lost 163–156 to Columbia QuadSquad and also lost their consolation round game to E-Ville Roller Derby 199–191 to finish out of the medals.

=== Rankings ===
Season	Final ranking	Playoffs	Championship
2014	144 WFTDA	DNQ	DNQ
2015	136 WFTDA	DNQ	DNQ
2016	56 WFTDA	DNQ	DNQ
2017	47 WFTDA	N/A	CR D2
2018	51 WFTDA	DNQ	DNQ
2019	49 WFTDA	DNQ	DNQ
2020	49 WFTDA	DNQ	DNQ

*Please note that rankings were suspended in March 2020 in light of the COVID-19 pandemic.

- CR = consolation round

== In the community ==
The league takes an active role in getting people in Teesside involved in roller derby and have organised and hosted fundraisers and events including running a pop-up shop as part of the 'We Are Open' project.
