= Birmingham Blitz Dames =

Roller derby league

- Metro area: Birmingham
- Country: United Kingdom
- Founded: 2006
- Dissolved: July 2021
- Teams: All Stars (A team); Bomb Squad (B team)
- Track type(s): Flat
- Venue: Futsal, Newtown, Birmingham
- Affiliations: WFTDA
- Org. type: non-profit
- Website: birminghamblitzdames.co.uk

Birmingham Blitz Dames (BBD) was a women's flat track roller derby league based in Birmingham in England. Founded in 2006, the league was a member of the Women's Flat Track Derby Association (WFTDA).

== History ==
BBD was founded in October 2006 by American transplant Brenda Bentley (Bee Sting née Iva Issues), who introduced roller derby to the West Midlands. The league was the first to form in the UK outside London, and was originally named the Birmingham Blitz Derby Dames. They took part in Europe's first roller derby tournament, Roll Britannia in 2009, hosted by the London Rollergirls. The tournament featured 12 teams from the UK and Germany, and was held at the historic Earls Court Exhibition Centre in London, England.

In 2009 the league was restructured and the name shortened to the Birmingham Blitz Dames. The league had two travel teams and over 70 members, recruiting and training new skaters on an ongoing basis.

The Dames were founder members of the UK Roller Derby Association.

Two skaters from the league were selected for the Roller Derby World Cup in 2011: Violet Attack for Team England, and Roisin Roulette for Team Ireland. In 2014 Roisin Roulette was again selected to compete for Team Ireland in the 2014 Roller Derby World Cup held in Dallas, Texas.

In 2021, it was announced that Birmingham Blitz Dames would merge with Central City Roller Derby to form Birmingham Roller Derby.

== WFTDA ==
Birmingham joined the WFTDA Apprentice Program in October 2014, and became a full member of the WFTDA in September 2015.

=== Rankings ===
Season	Final ranking	Playoffs	Championship
2015	NR	DNQ	DNQ
2016	179 WFTDA	DNQ	DNQ
2017	85 WFTDA	DNQ	DNQ

Preceded by New competition	British Roller Derby Championships Tier 3 Champions; 2015	Succeeded by Incumbent
