= Seaside Siren Roller Girls =

Roller derby league

- Metro area: Southend-on-Sea
- Country: England
- Founded: 2009
- Dissolved: 13 June 2018
- Teams: The Coast Busters (A team); Heartless Beaches (B team)
- Track type(s): Flat
- Venue: Southend Leisure and Tennis Centre
- Affiliations: UKRDA, WFTDA
- Website: www.seasidesirenrollergirls.com

The Seaside Siren Roller Girls (SSRG) was a roller derby league based in Southend-on-Sea, Essex, in England. Founded in 2009, the league consists of two teams, which compete against teams from other leagues. Seaside is a member of the Women's Flat Track Derby Association (WFTDA).

== History ==
The league was founded in November 2009 by six skaters who had formerly skated with another league, but wanted to play closer to their home town. The league began practising on Canvey Island, and had fourteen skaters by early 2010. It played its first bout in April 2011, when it faced the Norfolk Brawds.

In June 2012, the Seaside Sirens were accepted as a member of the United Kingdom Roller Derby Association, while in October 2013, they were accepted as a member of the Women's Flat Track Derby Association Apprentice Programme. Seaside became a full member of the WFTDA in January 2016. The team were officially disbanded in 2018 following a shortage of players.

== WFTDA rankings ==
Season	Final ranking	Playoffs	Championship
2017	331 WFTDA	N/A	N/A
