= Rainy City Roller Derby =

Roller derby league

- Metro area: Manchester
- Country: United Kingdom
- Founded: 2008
- Teams: Rainy City All Stars (A team); Reckoning (B team); Rebels (C team); Rising (D team)
- Track type: Flat
- Venue: Salford University Sports Centre
- Affiliations: WFTDA
- Website: rainycityrollerderby.com

Rainy City Roller Derby (RCRD) is a flat track roller derby league based in Manchester, England. Founded as Rainy City Roller Girls in 2008, the league consists of three teams that compete against teams from other leagues, and a development team.

Rainy City is a member of the United Kingdom Roller Derby Association (UKRDA) and the Women's Flat Track Derby Association (WFTDA), and served as the host league for the 2018 Roller Derby World Cup.

== League History ==
The first league in North West England, Rainy City played their first home bout in November 2009, against Leeds Roller Dolls. In September 2011 they opened the "Thunderdome", their own training and games venue, in a former snooker hall in Oldham which they renovated and made into the 'bouting venue of the North'.

Former Rainy City logo

In March 2012, the league joined the UK Roller Derby Association. They were accepted to the WFTDA Apprentice Program in July 2012, and became a full WFTDA member in September 2013.

Rainy City Roller Girls rebranded as Rainy City Roller Derby in 2016, and published their own guide on rebranding an established league. In December 2016, it was announced that Rainy City would host the 2018 Roller Derby World Cup, at the EventCity facility in Manchester.

In November 2020, they were forced to leave The Thunderdome after it was announced the landlord would be selling the venue to the local council for redevelopment. The building was approved for demolition in early March 2025.

== League structure ==
=== Travel teams ===
The league has three travel teams and a development squad.:

- Rainy City All Stars (A)
- Rainy City Reckoning (B)
- Rainy City Rebels (C)
- Rainy City Rising (Development)

=== Officiating crew ===
Rainy City have a well-established skating and non-skating officiating crew.

Pretty Miffed, the league's former Head NSO and WFTDA-certified Level 3 Non-Skating Official (NSO), was on the roster of Officials for the 2018 Roller Derby World Cup. Emily of the State and Yvel Saint Laurent (WFTDA level 2 NSOs), were also on the roster.

== National Team Representation ==
League member Missy Rascal was vice-captain for the Team England squad for the 2011 Roller Derby World Cup in Toronto alongside Rainy City team-mate Dee-Mise.

For the 2014 Roller Derby World Cup in Dallas, Missy Rascal returned to the Team England roster, this time joined by RCRD skater Fay Roberts.

Rainy City hosted the 2018 Roller Derby World Cup and their skaters were dominant in the Team England roster, with the return of Missy Rascal and Fay Roberts who were joined by first-timer world cup skaters Alex Valentine, Alex Wilde, Menace and Philly. Fayetal Blonde and Fisher were in the England training squad. Rainy City were additionally represented by Mattie and Perra Peligro skating for Team Spain, and Dana Scurry for Team Ireland.

The 2025 Roller Derby World Cup will be hosted in Innsbruck, Austria. Rainy City has representation from 21 skaters across multiple teams including England Roller Derby, Wales Roller Derby, Team Ireland, West Indies Roller Derby, Team Philippines Roller Derby, Team Italy Roller Derby and two referees on the officials roster.

== WFTDA competition ==
Rainy City played their first WFTDA-sanctioned game in October 2013 against Glasgow Roller Derby. At the WFTDA European Tournament (WET) in Malmö, Sweden, in November 2014, Rainy City went 2-1 with victories over Copenhagen Roller Derby and Oslo Roller Derby, followed by a narrow loss to Bear City Roller Derby.

In 2016, Rainy City qualified for WFTDA Playoffs for the first time, making the Division 1 tournament at Columbia, South Carolina as the seventh seed. During the weekend Rainy City went 2-2 with victories over Steel City Roller Derby (Pittsburgh) and Santa Cruz Derby Girls, and losses to Jacksonville RollerGirls and Crime City Rollers (Malmö), to finish the weekend in 6th place.

At the 2017 Division 1 Playoff in Malmö, Rainy City won their opening game against Calgary Roller Derby Association 324-81, but then narrowly lost their quarter final to London Rollergirls, 124-199, to miss Championships. Rainy City ended their weekend with a 258-78 consolation bracket win against Charm City Roller Girls.

In 2018, Rainy City qualified for WFTDA Playoffs in A Coruña, Spain where they finished in fourth place with a 174-146 loss to Angel City Derby.

The following year, they made it to the 2019 International WFTDA Playoffs in Winston-Salem, North Carolina. They faced up to Helsinki Roller Derby first, winning 145-126, before losing to Angel City Derby 106-162. They beat 2×4 Roller Derby 172-109, leaving them in fourth place.

October 2022 saw Rainy City All Stars travel to Malmö in Sweden to take part in EuroCup 2022, hosted by Crime City Rollers. They took silver in the final against the hosts, with a final score of 243-115 to Crime City.

In November 2023, Rainy City hosted EuroCup 2023. They played London Roller Derby in the final and won 195-153.

=== WFTDA rankings ===
Season	Final ranking	Playoffs	Championship
2013	166 WFTDA	N/A	N/A
2014	121 WFTDA	DNQ	DNQ
2015	99 WFTDA	DNQ	DNQ
2016	21 WFTDA	6 D1	DNQ
2017	11 WFTDA	6 CR D1	DNQ
2018	13 WFTDA	4	DNQ
2019	11 WFTDA	4	DNQ
2020	10 WFTDA	-	-

*Please note that rankings were suspended in March 2020 in light of the COVID-19 pandemic.

- CR = consolation round

== European competition ==
In 2013, Rainy City came first at the United Kingdom Roller Derby Association's "Sur5al" event, Tattoo Freeze 2013.

In 2018, Rainy City won the first EuroCup competition, which they hosted in Trafford, Greater Manchester. The four other WFTDA D1 European opponents were Crime City Rollers, Helsinki Roller Derby, Stockholm Roller Derby and Kallio Rolling Rainbow.

In 2019 Rainy City hosted the event once again, this time in Bury, Greater Manchester. Crime City Rollers, London Roller Derby's B team London Brawling, Helsinki Roller Derby, Auld Reekie Roller Derby, Stockholm Roller Derby and Tiger Bay Brawlers all took part. RCRD came second, behind Malmö's Crime City Rollers.

=== European rankings ===
==== 2012 European rankings ====
- Rainy City Roller Girls (A team), finished division 1, 9th (out of 13 teams)
- Tender Hooligans (B team), finished division 2, 37th (out of 39 teams)

==== 2011 European rankings ====
- Rainy City Roller Girls (A team), finished division 1, 7th (out of 10 teams)
- Tender Hooligans (B team), finished division 2, 25th (out of 26 teams)

==== 2010 European rankings ====
- Rainy City Roller Girls (A team), finished division 1, 3rd (out of 10 teams)
- Tender Hooligans (B team), finished division 2, 12th (out of 16 teams)

==== 2009 European rankings ====
- Rainy City Roller Girls (A team), finished division 1, 9th (out of 10 teams)
