= Central City Roller Derby =

European roller derby league

Central City Rollergirls
- Metro area: Birmingham, West Midlands
- Country: United Kingdom
- Founded: November 2007
- Dissolved: July 2021
- Teams: Belles of Centrinnians (A team); Slay Belles (B team); Raging Belles (Travel Team)
- Track type(s): Flat
- Venue: Cocks Moors Woods Leisure Centre, Birmingham, UK; Doug Ellis Sports Centre, BCU, Birmingham, UK
- Affiliations: WFTDA
- Org. type: Non-profit

Central City Roller Derby (CCR) was a women's flat track roller derby league based in Birmingham, United Kingdom. Founded in 2007, the league was a member of the Women's Flat Track Derby Association (WFTDA) and played under the WFTDA ruleset.

== League history ==
A group of girls who already had some skating experience first set up an informal practice in November 2007. This group expanded quickly and the league has since grown to boast over 70 full members including referees and support crew. CCR first became affiliated with the UK Roller Derby Association (UKRDA) in 2008. CCR became an official member of UKRDA in 2010 alongside other founder leagues In March 2012, the league was accepted as a full member of the WFTDA.

In 2021, it was announced that Central City Roller Derby would merge with Birmingham Blitz Dames to form Birmingham Roller Derby.

== Teams ==
CCR fielded two teams which travel the UK and Europe to typically play all star teams of similar leagues; these are the A Team and B Team.

The 2010/11 season saw the debut of CCR's intra-league teams, Bad Apples, Disco Beaters and Queens of Steel. These teams played each other once during the season in a round-robin format - with the top two teams qualifying for a grand final at the end of the season. The 2012/13 season intra-league final saw the Queens of Steel victorious over the Bad Apples in June 2013.

== WFTDA rankings ==
Season	Final ranking	Playoffs	Championship
2013	125 WFTDA	DNQ	DNQ
2014	152 WFTDA	DNQ	DNQ
2015	140 WFTDA	DNQ	DNQ
2016	83 WFTDA	DNQ	DNQ
2017	92 WFTDA	DNQ	DNQ

== International ==
In 2011, league member Hustle Her was named to Team England for the 2011 Roller Derby World Cup, and coach Barry Fight was named a coach for Team England as well.

Agent Dana Scurry and Tinchy Slider were selected as part of Team Ireland for 2013-14 and went on to compete at the 2014 Roller Derby World Cup in Dallas, while Viv LaFrance was selected for Roller Derby France.

In 2013, coach Ill Billy was selected as part of Team England Men's Roller Derby, and was named Head Coach of the women's Team England.

2016 Jelly Mean was selected as part of Team Belgium to compete in the 2018 Roller Derby World Cup.

== Membership ==
CCR welcomed potential new members every week and did not require previous roller derby experience, or roller skating experience to join the league. CCR had a dedicated training session for new skaters every week, as well as including them as part of the main league training session at weekends. CCR welcomed both men and women, though men cannot compete as part of CCR and are encouraged to train as referees or coaches.

== Boot Camps ==
CCR arranged its first boot camp with guest coaches Bonnie D Stroir and Estro Jen after members met with them at RollerCon in 2007 in Las Vegas. Grange Hell was CCR's first 2-day Boot Camp held in October 2009 at Cocks Moors Woods Leisure Centre and skaters from leagues travelled the country to attend.

In May 2010 CCR hosted the first Blood and Thunder three day Boot Camp in Birmingham. Bonnie D Stroir and Estro Jen returned with Quadzilla, Coach Pauly and Shirley Insance whilst Miss Trial, Conan the Vegetarian and London Rollergirls coach Ballistic Whistle ran a referee boot camp. The event proved extremely successful.

May Bank Holiday 2011 saw the return of Blood and Thunder boot camp to Birmingham. Guest coaches at the 2011 event were Ballistic Whistle, Black Dahlia, SmackYa Sideways, Coach Smarty, Teflon Donna and Varla Vendetta.
