= 2014 Roller Derby World Cup =

International roller derby tournament

- 2014

Tournament information
- Sport: Roller derby
- Location: Dallas, United States
- Dates: December 4, 2014–December 7, 2014
- Established: 2011
- Venue: Kay Bailey Hutchison Convention Center
- Teams: 30 nations
- Website: rollerderbyworldcup.com

Final positions
- Champions: United States
- 1st runners-up: England
- 2nd runners-up: Australia

Tournament statistics
- Matches played: 58
- Points scored: 21212 (365.72 per match)

The 2014 Roller Derby World Cup is an international women's roller derby tournament organized by Blood & Thunder magazine. Teams of amateur skaters from six continents compete for their respective nations.

The 2014 Roller Derby World Cup is the second held, taking place from December 4 through 7, 2014, at Kay Bailey Hutchison Convention Center in Dallas, Texas, United States. Team USA defeated Team England in the final, repeating their victory from the 2011 Roller Derby World Cup.

== Participating countries ==
Thirty countries took part, including all thirteen teams from the inaugural event. As before, the 2014 event was played and officiated under a ruleset developed and standardized by the Women's Flat Track Derby Association (WFTDA), although not a WFTDA-sponsored event. The participating countries were (returning countries in bold):

- **Argentina**
- **Australia**
- Belgium
- **Brazil**
- **Canada**
- Chile
- Colombia
- Denmark
- **England**
- **Finland**
- **France**
- **Germany**
- Greece
- **Ireland**
- Italy
- Japan
- Mexico
- Netherlands
- **New Zealand**
- Norway
- Portugal
- Puerto Rico
- **Scotland**
- South Africa
- Spain
- **Sweden**
- Switzerland
- Wales
- West Indies
- **United States**

== Group stage ==
All teams competed in the group stage. Each team was placed in one of eight groups, which contained either three or four teams. Each of the top eight seeds was placed in a different group, with the number one seed placed in Group 8 and the number eight seed placed in Group 1. Every team played all the other teams in their group for forty-minute matches, and this process determined the seeding for the elimination stage, which were sixty-minute matches.

Here are the results of the group stage. Each of the eight top-seeded teams won their group.

=== Group 1 ===
Team	Pld	W	L	PtsF	PtsA	PtD
New Zealand	3	3	0	783	134	+649
Norway	3	2	1	428	403	+25
Wales	3	1	2	373	497	-124
South Africa	3	0	3	192	742	-550

Date	Result			
4 December 2014	**New Zealand**	**218**	59	Norway
4 December 2014	South Africa	97	**208**	**Wales**
4 December 2014	**New Zealand**	**315**	15	South Africa
4 December 2014	**Norway**	**150**	105	Wales
5 December 2014	**Norway**	**219**	80	South Africa
5 December 2014	**New Zealand**	**250**	60	Wales

=== Group 2 ===
Team	Pld	W	L	PtsF	PtsA	PtD
France	3	3	0	994	77	+917
Brazil	3	2	1	301	562	-261
Portugal	3	1	2	314	609	-295
Switzerland	3	0	3	267	628	-361

Date	Result			
4 December 2014	**France**	**369**	27	Switzerland
4 December 2014	**Brazil**	**167**	139	Portugal
4 December 2014	**France**	**315**	14	Brazil
4 December 2014	Switzerland	132	**139**	**Portugal**
5 December 2014	Switzerland	108	**120**	**Brazil**
5 December 2014	**France**	**310**	36	Portugal

=== Group 3 ===
Team	Pld	W	L	PtsF	PtsA	PtD
Sweden	3	3	0	1074	80	+994
West Indies	3	2	1	380	489	-109
Chile	3	1	2	435	453	-18
Japan	3	0	3	123	990	-867

Date	Result			
4 December 2014	**Sweden**	**319**	41	West Indies
4 December 2014	Japan	53	**296**	**Chile**
4 December 2014	**Sweden**	**459**	0	Japan
5 December 2014	**West Indies**	**235**	70	Japan
5 December 2014	**Sweden**	**296**	39	Chile
5 December 2014	**West Indies**	**104**	100	Chile

=== Group 4 ===
Team	Pld	W	L	PtsF	PtsA	PtD
Finland	3	3	0	686	148	+538
Scotland	3	2	1	515	224	+291
Colombia	3	1	2	248	553	-305
Mexico	3	0	3	158	682	-524

Date	Result			
4 December 2014	Finland	248	32	Colombia
4 December 2014	Scotland	207	45	Mexico
4 December 2014	Finland	126	78	Scotland
4 December 2014	Colombia	163	75	Mexico
5 December 2014	Finland	312	38	Mexico
5 December 2014	Scotland	230	53	Colombia

=== Group 5 ===
Team	Pld	W	L	PtsF	PtsA	PtD
Australia	3	3	0	1311	46	+1265
Belgium	3	2	1	470	531	-61
Greece	3	1	2	238	704	-466
Italy	3	0	3	173	911	-738

Date	Result			
4 December 2014	**Australia**	**513**	5	Italy
4 December 2014	**Belgium**	**173**	96	Greece
4 December 2014	**Australia**	**349**	24	Belgium
4 December 2014	Italy	82	**125**	**Greece**
5 December 2014	**Australia**	**449**	17	Greece
5 December 2014	Italy	86	**273**	**Belgium**

=== Group 6 ===
Team	Pld	W	L	PtsF	PtsA	PtD
England	3	3	0	895	101	+794
Ireland	3	2	1	395	532	-137
Germany	3	1	2	376	484	-108
Spain	3	0	3	164	713	-549

Date	Result			
4 December 2014	**England**	**272**	31	Germany
4 December 2014	Spain	74	**203**	**Ireland**
4 December 2014	**England**	**294**	20	Spain
4 December 2014	Germany	129	**142**	**Ireland**
5 December 2014	**England**	**329**	50	Ireland
5 December 2014	**Germany**	**216**	70	Spain

=== Group 7 ===
Team	Pld	W	L	PtsF	PtsA	PtD
Canada	2	2	0	587	73	+514
Argentina	2	1	1	252	371	-119
Denmark	2	0	2	108	503	-395

Date	Result			
4 December 2014	**Canada**	**286**	50	Argentina
4 December 2014	**Canada**	**301**	23	Denmark
5 December 2014	Denmark	85	**202**	**Argentina**

=== Group 8 ===
Team	Pld	W	L	PtsF	PtsA	PtD
United States	2	2	0	1142	18	+1124
Netherlands	2	1	1	224	659	-435
Puerto Rico	2	0	2	157	846	-689

Date	Result			
4 December 2014	**United States**	**505**	15	Netherlands
4 December 2014	**United States**	**637**	3	Puerto Rico
5 December 2014	Puerto Rico	154	**209**	**Netherlands**

== Elimination stage ==
The first two rounds of the playoffs were played on 6 December 2014, the semifinals and finals were played on 7 December 2014.

After the Round of sixteen, the remaining teams were reseeded for the quarterfinals.

=== Round of sixteen ===
All games were played on 6 December 2014. All times are Central Standard Time (UTC−06:00).

The point differential was used to determine the seeding of the next round.

Time	Track	Result				Point differential
9:00AM	Track 1	**Canada**	**581**	75	Brazil	506
9:00AM	Track 2	**Sweden**	**303**	133	Ireland	170
11:00AM	Track 1	**New Zealand**	**356**	91	Netherlands	265
11:00AM	Track 2	**United States**	**854**	6	Norway	848
1:00PM	Track 1	France	162	**205**	**Argentina**	43
1:00PM	Track 2	**Finland**	**383**	124	Belgium	259
3:00PM	Track 1	**Australia**	**464**	35	Scotland	429
3:00PM	Track 2	**England**	**708**	31	West Indies	677

=== Quarterfinals through finals ===
The quarterfinals were played on 6 December 2014. The semis and finals were on 7 December 2014. Team USA won the cup.

Quarterfinals
1	**United States**	**569**
8	Argentina	14
4	**Australia**	**284**
5	New Zealand	56
2	**England**	**278**
7	Sweden	72
3	**Canada**	**290**
6	Finland	145

Semifinals
**United States**	**259**
Australia	54
**England**	**156**
Canada	112

Finals
**United States**	**219**
England	105
Third place
**Australia**	**197**
Canada	128
