= Leeds Roller Derby =

Roller derby league

- Metro area: Leeds
- Country: United Kingdom
- Founded: 2016
- Teams: Leeds Roller Derby A (A team); Leeds Roller Derby B (B team)
- Track type: Flat
- Venue: The Edge at University of Leeds
- Affiliations: WFTDA
- Website: leedsrollerderby.com

Leeds Roller Derby is a women's flat track roller derby league based in Leeds, England. Founded in 2016 after the merge of two leagues, the league has two travel teams which play against teams from other leagues across Europe. Leeds Roller Derby is a member of the United Kingdom Roller Derby Association (UKRDA) and the Women's Flat Track Derby Association (WFTDA).

== History ==
In December 2016, Leeds Roller Dolls and Hot Wheel Roller Derby merged as one league, continuing under the name Leeds Roller Derby.

== History of Original Leagues ==
=== Leeds Roller Dolls ===
Leeds Roller Dolls was founded in October 2007, becoming the first roller derby league in Yorkshire. They played their first bout, against Auld Reekie Roller Girls, in November 2008. In 2010 the league moved to play its bouts in the nearby town of Huddersfield. They returned to Leeds in 2013, hosting their games at the Leeds Futsal Arena.

The league consisted of two teams: the Whip-Its (A), and the Rebel Roses (B).

Former Leeds Roller Dolls logo

In late 2011 the league joined the United Kingdom Roller Derby Association and in January 2012, it was accepted into the WFTDA Apprentice Program. In March 2013, it became a full member of the WFTDA.

A number of Leeds Roller Dolls, including Feral Fairy, Shere Carnage and Rigor Morris, helped establish and train Aire Force One, Leeds' men's roller derby team.

Former Hot Wheel Roller Derby logo

=== Hot Wheel Roller Derby ===
Hot Wheel Roller Derby was founded in 2010, with two teams which competed against teams from other leagues. By mid-2011, Hot Wheel had more than forty skaters. In May 2012, the league travelled to Germany, where it beat the Stuttgart Valley Roller Girlz B team in front of a crowd of 1,200 fans. In July, they narrowly lost to the Middlesbrough Milk Rollers in the final of the Great Yorkshire Showdown tournament, where they had been ranked last the previous year.

March 2013 saw Hot Wheels' European Roller Derby ranking at 19th, and by September 2013 they had risen to 16th. In 2014, head coach Jerry Attric served as coach for the men's Team England Roller Derby, where they came second in the world. The Hot Wheel B Team played their first four bouts and were the highest-ranked all-female team at Sur5al. Hot Wheel Roller Derby joined the WFTDA Apprentice Program in October 2015, and became a full member league in June 2016.

== Teams ==
Leeds Roller Derby has two travel teams, an A and B team, which play against teams from other leagues. The Rotten Rollers, the initial travel team name, was retired at the end of the 2010 Season.

== National Team Representation ==
Feral Fairy of Leeds Roller Dolls was selected for Team England at the 2011 Roller Derby World Cup.

== WFTDA rankings ==
Season	Final ranking	Playoffs	Championship
2013	155 WFTDA	DNQ	DNQ
2014	161 WFTDA	DNQ	DNQ
2015	88 WFTDA	DNQ	DNQ
2016	63 WFTDA	DNQ	DNQ
2017	189 WFTDA	DNQ	DNQ
2018	158 WFTDA	DNQ	DNQ
2019	205 WFTDA	DNQ	DNQ
2020	203 WFTDA	DNQ	DNQ

- Hot Wheel Roller Derby never received an official WFTDA ranking during its brief time as a member league; rankings before 2017 are for Leeds Roller Dolls
- No rankings from March 2020-2022 due to COVID-19 pandemic
