= Derby name =

Nicknames used by roller derby players

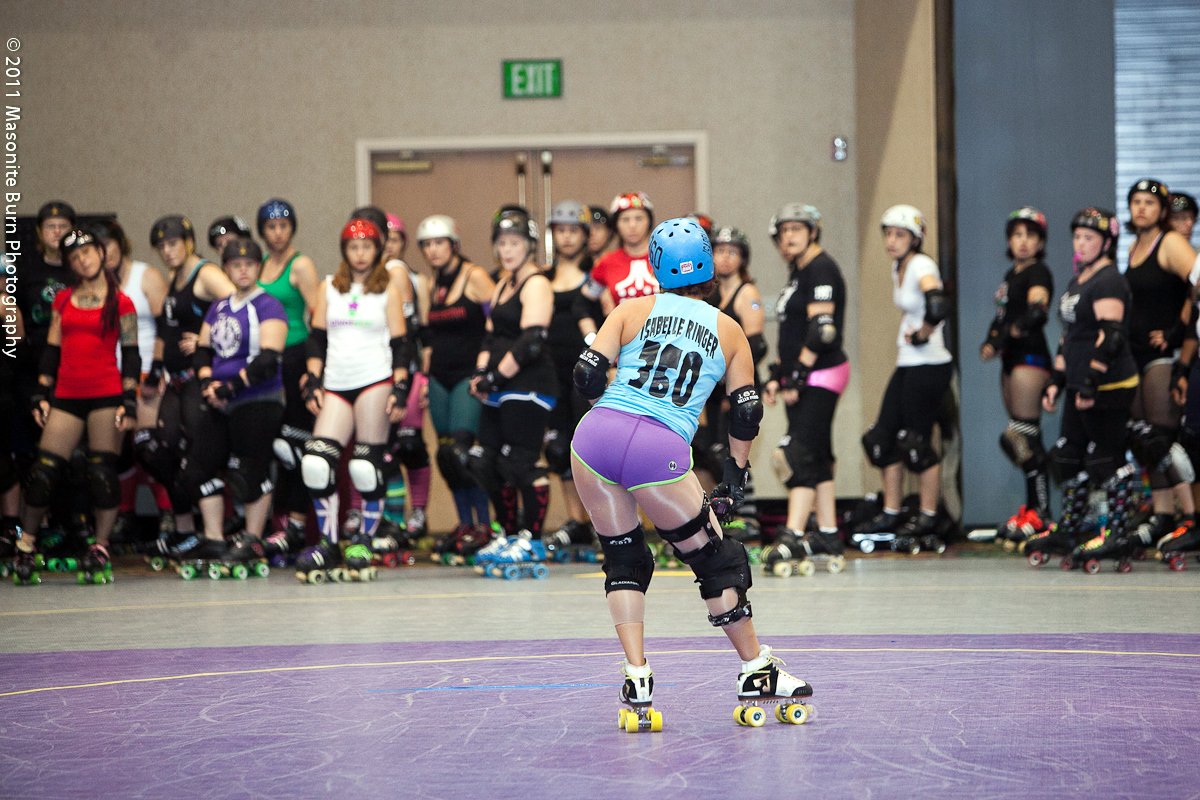
"Isabelle Ringer" of the San Diego Derby Dolls displays her derby name while coaching a group of skaters.

A derby name, roller derby name or skater name is a nickname used by a skater while playing or officiating roller derby.

Derby names can be seen as an opportunity to adopt an alternative on-track persona. Many derby names are puns, and in some cases this may extend to the skater's number. Other names may be chosen to reflect a skater's playing style or ability. Tablet Magazine describes the ideal derby name as showing "both aggression and humor" and "reveal[ing] something about the skater". For example, Hydra, a former Texas Rollergirls skater, chose her name in part due to her profession as a hydrologist, and in part in reference to the mythological creature. Fagundes suggests that the ideal derby name "sounds something like a real name", in that it has a plausible first- and last-name, "connects to derby", and contributes to an "overall persona". He gives LA Derby Dolls skater Tara Armov as an example of an ideal-type name.

Although some skaters in pre-2000 banked track roller derby did have nicknames, the tradition of derby names did not emerge until the early-2000s revival in Austin, Texas, which was mirrored by Ivanna S. Pankin of Arizona Roller Derby, who had previously used her derby name while working as a musician.

Around 40,000 skater names are registered on the International Rollergirls' Master Roster. The roster originated as a spreadsheet kept by Hydra. In November 2004, Axles of Evil proposed that a centralised record of derby names be created, and Hydra then launched the roster publicly. Hydra passed responsibility for the roster to Paige Burner, Soylent Mean and Jelly HoNut late the following year, by which point it already had more than two thousand entries.

Despite its name, the roster also includes the derby names of male skaters, referees and other officials. Names on the roster are not permitted to be identical or very similar to pre-existing entries. This is not reflective of actual WFTDA policy, which allows skaters to have the same derby name. The growing popularity of roller derby has also made creating an entirely unique name much more difficult. The International Rollergirls' Master Roster has other restrictions, such as prohibitions on names starting with possessives, ending with gerunds, or very general, such as "Skater".

Many leagues will only submit derby names to the roster once a skater has shown significant commitment to the sport. For example, it took more than four months of practice before Nicole Williams adopted her derby name, "Bonnie Thunders".

A few skaters choose to trademark their roller derby names, and this practice may occasionally lead to conflict. For example, when Mad Rollin' Dolls skater Crackerjack attempted to trademark her name, in order to license it for use in a video game, she was sued by the manufacturers of the Cracker Jack snack food.

Skaters are not required to use derby names, and a few do skate under their legal names. This may be due to dissatisfaction with the name which they used in the past, or, like leading London Rollergirls skater Stephanie Mainey, in an effort to legitimise the sport. Other skaters counter that derby names are an important part of the culture of the sport, and reflect the use of nicknames in many other sports.
