= Glasgow Roller Derby =

Roller derby league

- Metro area: Glasgow
- Country: United Kingdom
- Founded: March 2007
- Teams: Irn Bruisers (A team); Maiden Grrders (B team); Cannie Gingers (C team); Bad Omens; Death Stars; Tyrannosaurus Wrecks
- Track type: Flat
- Venue: Glasgow Caledonian University
- Affiliations: WFTDA
- Website: https://glasgowrollerderby.org/

Glasgow Roller Derby is a flat track roller derby league in Glasgow, Scotland. Founded in 2007, the league consists of two travel teams, three home teams and a skater training course for players and referees. Glasgow is a member of the United Kingdom Roller Derby Association (UKRDA), and the Women's Flat Track Derby Association (WFTDA).

The league has taken part in international competition, most notably the WFTDA Division 1 Playoff in Jacksonville, Florida in 2015, eventually coming in ninth place. Also in 2015, Glasgow Roller Derby were Tier 1 winners at the British Roller Derby Championships. Skaters from the league have featured in Team Ireland Roller Derby and Team Scotland Roller Derby.

== League Structure ==
=== Travel Teams ===
The three travel teams have names inspired by the popular Scottish carbonated beverage, Irn-Bru:

- Irn Bruisers (A, first game 2008)
- Maiden Grrders (B, first game 2009)
- Cannie Gingers (C, active 2014–2015, 2025-present)

=== Home Teams ===
The three currently active home teams play in intra-league tournaments to give newer players the chance to try out their skills in front of an audience in a lower stakes environment than a game against another team, and promotes healthy competition between players:

- Bad Omens (established 2011)
- Death Stars (established 2011)
- Tyrannosaurus Wrecks (established 2013)
- Hell's Belles (2010–2014)

=== Glasgow Roller Recruits ===
The Glasgow Roller Recruits (GRR) are Glasgow Roller Derby's newest skaters. The league runs an intensive skating course three times a year to teach the skills needed to play or referee roller derby safely, and move up from Glasgow Roller Recruits to the main league.

To be eligible, all participants must be over 18. To graduate to league as a player, skaters must fit into the WFTDA gender statement. Skating officials can be any gender, as can non-skating officials (NSOs) and other league volunteers.

== League History ==
Old Glasgow Roller Girls logo

Established by Teri Toxic and Mistress Malicious in February 2007 as the Glasgow Roller Girls, the first training session was held in April of the same year. Glasgow was the first roller derby league in Scotland, and fourth in the United Kingdom after London Rollergirls, Birmingham Blitz Dames and London Rockin’ Rollers.

Training sessions initially took place outdoors in Kelvingrove Park in less-than ideal Glaswegian weather conditions, thereafter moving to a regular slot at Glasgow Caledonian University. This has been their main training and game venue ever since.

The league's first bout was in March 2008, with the Irn Bruisers facing up to London Rollergirls’ All-Star A-team, London Brawling. Later that same year, the Irn Bruisers hosted the first transatlantic match, against an early iteration of Team Canada.

In 2009, the Irn Bruisers participated in the first ever European roller derby tournament, Roll Britannia, hosted at Earl's Court by London Rollergirls. In September, Glasgow Roller Girls gained a B-team, the Maiden Grrders who played their first game against Auld Reekie Roller Derby’s B-team.

Glasgow Roller Derby's Irn Bruisers and Maiden Grrders came in first and third positions respectively in the first Scottish roller derby tournament, Highland Fling, in 2010. In that same year, the first home teams competition was planned and Hell's Belles came into being, closely followed by Bad Omens and Death Stars. The league was also involved in the inception of the UK Roller Derby Association, becoming one of its first members in June 2010.

In July 2011, Glasgow Roller Girls were accepted as a Women's Flat Track Derby Association Apprentice league, graduating as a full member the following June.

The league rebranded in early 2012, with a name change to Glasgow Roller Derby as well as a new logo and colour scheme. GRD hosted their first tournament, Chaos on the Clyde, featuring teams from all over the UK as well as Stuttgart.

Glasgow Roller Derby is a passionate advocate for LGBT inclusion in sport, with two league members having previously acted as the Transgender Liaison for the UK Roller Derby Association, Jodie Stanley and Freyja Gosnold.

In 2015, Glasgow qualified for the WFTDA International Playoffs for the first time, entering the Division 1 Playoff in Jacksonville, Florida as the seventh seed. All the hard work paid off as Glasgow were the Tier 1 winner at the British Roller Derby Championships 2015.

For their 10th anniversary, Glasgow Roller Derby hosted a big birthday bash with three games – Rising Stars Women, Advanced Women, and Co-ed – as well as face painting, a roller disco and the afterparty.

== National Team Representation ==
Glasgow Roller Derby players, coaches and referees have performed at the highest levels and have often been selected to represent their countries in the Roller Derby World Cup.

For the 2011 Roller Derby World Cup, Betty Gogo, Lily Lethal, Marla Mayhem, Marshall Lawless, Mistress Malicious, Viper, Whiskey Galore and Wild Oates were selected for the Team Scotland roster.

Chemikill Hazard and Coco Pox played for Team Ireland Roller Derby in 2011, with Chemikill Hazard returning for the 2014 Roller Derby World Cup team accompanied by Sarah McMillan.

Jess E. Ska, Mona Rampage, Rogue Runner, Splat and Suffra Jet joined returning player Marshall Lawless for the Team Scotland lineup in 2014.

The 2018 Roller Derby World Cup Team Scotland roster saw Devil's Advoskate, Phoenix Fatale and Shorty McLightningpants keeping returning skater Mona Rampage company.

== WFTDA competition ==
In 2015, Glasgow qualified for Playoffs for the first time, entering the Division 1 Playoff in Jacksonville, Florida as the seventh seed. After losses of 184–159 to Charlottesville Derby Dames and 284–100 to Tampa Roller Derby, Glasgow rebounded to win the ninth place game against Pikes Peak Derby Dames, 247–153.

=== Rankings ===
Season	Final ranking	Playoffs	Championship
2013	99 WFTDA	DNQ	DNQ
2014	76 WFTDA	DNQ	DNQ
2015	29 WFTDA	9 D1	DNQ
2016	196 WFTDA	DNQ	DNQ
2017	265 WFTDA	DNQ	DNQ
2018	268 WFTDA	DNQ	DNQ
2019	204 WFTDA	DNQ	DNQ
2020	216 WFTDA	DNQ	DNQ

*Please note that rankings were suspended in March 2020 in light of the COVID-19 pandemic.

== Five Nations Roller Derby Championships ==
Glasgow have participated in the Women Tier 1 Premier division of the Five Nations Roller Derby Championships (renamed in 2021 from the British Roller Derby Championships) on three occasions since 2015.

They were dominant in 2015, winning all of their games to win championships. They beat Middlesbrough Milk Rollers 205–119, Auld Reekie Roller Derby 206–90, Tiger Bay Brawlers 280–54, Rainy City Roller Derby 267-79 and Central City Rollergirls 205–109.

GRD had less of an easy time of it in 2016, losing 198–122 to Leeds Roller Derby, 238–109 to Newcastle Roller Derby and 164–210 to London Roller Derby Brawl Saints (B), but managed to win against Royal Windsor Roller Derby 203–179.

In 2018, the league struggled at their previous level and lost all their games, 311–66 to Central City Roller Derby, 267–132 to London Rockin' Rollers and 112–274 to Liverpool Roller Birds.

Glasgow took time out to regroup in 2019 and didn't compete in the Championships that year.

== Results of Public Games ==
All available results for public games are shown below. The league does sometimes host 'closed door' games, the results of which are excluded from this list.

Green highlighted rows indicate a win, whilst red highlighting indicates a loss.

=== Irn Bruisers ===
Breakdown of results
Total	Won	Lost
114	60	54

Date	Event	Result	Opponents
29 March 2008		163 - 31	London Rollergirls
12 April 2008		91 - 74	Birmingham Blitz Dames
6 June 2008		41 - 102	Team Canada (roller derby)
21 February 2009		80 - 83	Birmingham Blitz Dames
21 March 2009		83 - 103	London Rockin' Rollers
18 July 2009	Roll Britannia	59 - 48	London Rockin' Rollers
18 July 2009	Roll Britannia	29 - 88	Rainy City Roller Derby
19 July 2009	Roll Britannia	11 - 225	London Rollergirls
19 July 2009	Roll Britannia	70 - 120	Auld Reekie Roller Girls
26 September 2009		110 - 64	Auld Reekie Roller Girls
31 October 2009		126 - 78	Rainy City Roller Derby
13 February 2010		116 - 102	London Rockin' Rollers
20 March 2010		79 - 19	London Rollergirls
27 March 2010		102 - 66	Central City Rollergirls
22 May 2010	Highland Fling	145 - 23	Granite City Rollergirls
22 May 2010	Highland Fling	3 - 198	Auld Reekie Roller Girls All-Star Reserves
23 May 2010	Highland Fling	98 - 95	Auld Reekie Roller Girls
26 June 2010		84 - 88	Auld Reekie Roller Girls
21 August 2010		86 - 85	Leeds Roller Dolls
30 October 2010		82 - 78	Rainy City Roller Derby
20 March 2011		128 - 75	Central City Rollergirls
12 June 2011		50 - 311	London Rollergirls
2 July 2011		186 - 58	Tiger Bay Brawlers
16 July 2011		65 - 111	Stuttgart Valley Rollergirlz
6 August 2011		126 - 91	Auld Reekie Roller Girls
20 August 2011		107 - 113	Leeds Roller Dolls
24 September 2011		221 - 74	Lincolnshire Bombers Roller Girls
29 October 2011		175 - 119	Rainy City Roller Derby
15 January 2012	2012 Tattoo Freeze	12 - 94	London Rollergirls Batter C Power
15 January 2012	2012 Tattoo Freeze	97 - 77	Central City Roller Girls
15 January 2012	2012 Tattoo Freeze	74 - 79	Auld Reekie Roller Girls
10 March 2012		121 - 152	Bear City Roller Derby
14 April 2012		120 - 122	Stockholm Roller Derby
19 May 2012		203 - 121	Paris Rollergirls
9 June 2012		77 - 187	Crime City Rollers
10 June 2012		89 - 191	Copenhagen Roller Derby
25 August 2012	Chaos on the Clyde	114 - 168	London Rockin' Rollers
26 August 2012	Chaos on the Clyde	324 - 57	Stuttgart Valley Rollergirlz
26 August 2012	Chaos on the Clyde	194 - 82	Leeds Roller Dolls
8 September 2012		181 - 137	GO-GO Gent Roller Girls
27 October 2012		139 - 158	Rainy City Roller Girls
16 November 2012	Track Queens - Battle Royal	205 - 134	Stockholm Roller Derby
17 November 2012	Track Queens - Battle Royal	145 - 171	Crime City Rollers
18 November 2012	Track Queens - Battle Royal	149 - 208	Central City Roller Derby
8 December 2012		107 - 113	Tiger Bay Brawlers
23 February 2013		163 - 187	Auld Reekie Roller Girls
20 April 2013		310 - 111	Brighton Rockers Roller Derby
29 June 2013	2013 East Coast Derby Extravaganza	226 - 120	Columbia Quad Squad
30 June 2013	2013 East Coast Derby Extravaganza	153 - 154	Long Island Roller Rebels
11 August 2013		149 - 150	Stockholm Roller Derby
25 August 2013		277 - 105	Helsinki Roller Derby All Stars (Ninja Turtles)
21 September 2013		150 - 140	Bear City Roller Derby
26 October 2013		240 - 111	Rainy City Roller Derby
23 November 2013		59 - 161	Leeds Roller Dolls
8 February 2014		215 - 130	London Rollergirls
29 March 2014		130 - 162	Tiger Bay Brawlers
16 May 2014	2014 Spring Roll	159 - 167	Fort Wayne Derby Girls
17 May 2014	2014 Spring Roll	147 - 226	Big Easy Rollergirls
17 May 2014	2014 Spring Roll	190 - 175	Tri-City Roller Derby
18 May 2014	2014 Spring Roll	107 - 276	CT RollerGirls
13 September 2014		241 - 96	Middlesbrough Milk Rollers
8 November 2014		249 - 82	Dublin Roller Derby
14 February 2015	British Roller Derby Championships 2015: Women T1 Premier	205 - 109	Central City Rollergirls
15 February 2015	British Roller Derby Championships 2015: Women T1 Premier	267 - 79	Rainy City Roller Derby
18 April 2015		152 - 116	Bear City Roller Derby
2 May 2015	British Roller Derby Championships 2015: Women T1 Premier	54 - 280	Tiger Bay Brawlers
2 May 2015	British Roller Derby Championships 2015: Women T1 Premier	90 - 206	Auld Reekie Roller Girls
30 May 2015	British Roller Derby Championships 2015: Women T1 Premier	119 - 205	Middlesbrough Milk Rollers
31 May 2015		227 - 131	Rainy City Roller Girls
28 June 2015		119 - 185	Auld Reekie Roller Girls
18 September 2015	2015 WFTDA Division 1 Playoff 3	159 - 184	Charlottesville Derby Dames
19 September 2015	2015 WFTDA Division 1 Playoff 3	284 - 100	Tampa Roller Derby
20 September 2015	2015 WFTDA Division 1 Playoff 3	247 - 153	Pikes Peak Derby Dames
21 February 2016	British Roller Derby Championships 2016: Women Tier 1 Premier	164 - 210	London Rollergirls
21 February 2016	British Roller Derby Championships 2016: Women Tier 1 Premier	238 - 109	Newcastle Roller Girls
5 March 2016	The European Smackdown	536 - 46	Crime City Rollers
5 March 2016	The European Smackdown	73 - 485	Helsinki Roller Derby
6 March 2016	The European Smackdown	526 - 9	London Rollergirls
6 March 2016	The European Smackdown	371 - 66	Stockholm Roller Derby
26 March 2016	British Roller Derby Championships 2016: Women Tier 1 Premier	203 - 179	Royal Windsor Roller Derby
26 March 2016	British Roller Derby Championships 2016: Women Tier 1 Premier	122 - 198	Leeds Roller Derby
23 April 2016		105 - 214	Bear City Roller Derby
11 June 2016		373 - 36	Rainy City Roller Derby
11 June 2016		351 - 131	Tiger Bay Brawlers
10 September 2016		261 - 96	Newcastle Roller Derby
5 November 2016		401 - 75	Dublin Roller Derby
8 April 2017	West Track Story V	184 - 240	Dirty River Roller Derby
8 April 2017	West Track Story V	100 - 357	Nantes Roller Derby
9 April 2017	West Track Story V	140 - 212	GO-GO Gent Roller Derby
9 April 2017	West Track Story V	54 - 350	Antwerp Roller Derby
11 June 2017		135 - 177	Amsterdam Roller Derby
2 September 2017		132 - 368	Granite City Roller Derby
7 October 2017		386 - 165	Newcastle Roller Derby
12 May 2018	British Roller Derby Championships 2018: Women's T1 UKRDA Premier	112 - 274	Liverpool Roller Birds
19 May 2018		144 - 373	Dundee Roller Derby
16 June 2018	British Roller Derby Championships 2018: Women's T1 UKRDA Premier	132 - 267	London Rockin' Rollers
7 July 2018	British Roller Derby Championships 2018: Women's T1 UKRDA Premier	311 - 66	Central City Roller Derby
28 July 2018		220 - 223	Limerick Roller Derby
28 July 2018		383 - 118	Belfast Roller Derby
3 November 2018		118 - 237	Rainy City Roller Derby Rainy City Revolution (B)
24 November 2018	Skate Around Tournament 2018	213 - 151	Namur Roller Derby
24 November 2018	Skate Around Tournament 2018	186 - 145	Lutece Destroyeuses Roller Derby Paris
25 November 2018	Skate Around Tournament 2018	270 - 143	Vienna Roller Derby
28 April 2019		135 - 139	Leicestershire Dolly Rockit Rollers
1 June 2019		184 - 229	Brighton Rockers Roller Derby
15 June 2019		101 - 310	Royal Windsor Roller Derby
16 June 2019		143 - 236	London Rockin' Rollers
17 August 2019	Chaos on the Clyde 2019	224 - 109	Kent Roller Derby
18 August 2019	Chaos on the Clyde 2019	235 - 132	Auld Reekie Roller Derby All-Star Reserves
18 August 2019	Chaos on the Clyde 2019	151 - 147	Liverpool Roller Birds
5 October 2019	The Incredible KickAss Cup 2019	128 - 203	Namur Roller Derby
5 October 2019	The Incredible KickAss Cup 2019	60 - 200	St. Pauli Roller Derby
6 October 2019	The Incredible KickAss Cup 2019	188 - 143	Barcelona Roller Derby
9 November 2019		141 - 179	Dublin Roller Derby B

=== Maiden Grrders ===
Breakdown of results
Total	Won	Lost
48	26	22

Date	Event	Result	Opponents
26 September 2009		97 - 66	Auld Reekie Roller Girls
31 October 2009		80 - 83	Cambridge Rollerbillies
27 March 2010		69 - 53	Central City Rollergirls B
22 May 2010	Highland Fling	22 - 98	Auld Reekie Roller Girls
22 May 2010	Highland Fling	11 - 121	Dundee Roller Girls
23 May 2010	Highland Fling	40 - 163	Granite City Roller Girls
26 June 2010		116 - 66	Auld Reekie Roller Girls All-Star Reserves
20 March 2011		84 - 82	Central City Roller Girls
2 March 2011		124 - 108	Newcastle Roller Girls
23 April 2011		44 - 191	Dundee Roller Girls
2 July 2011		90 - 73	Dublin Roller Derby
6 August 2011		126 - 86	Auld Reekie Roller Girls All-Star Reserves
24 September 2011		305 - 27	Lincolnshire Bombers Roller Girls The Damebusters
29 October 2011		143 - 141	Crime City Rollers
3 March 2012		136 - 129	Dublin Roller Derby
4 March 2012		127 - 248	Cork City Firebirds
10 March 2012		214 - 79	Granite City Roller Girls
24 March 2012		156 - 164	Newcastle Roller Girls
14 April 2012		285 - 69	Stockholm Roller Derby BSTRDs
19 May 2012		290 - 57	Dundee Roller Girls
28 July 2012	2012 Great Yorkshire Showdown	50 - 51	Leeds Roller Derby B Team
28 July 2012	2012 Great Yorkshire Showdown	75 - 24	Middlesbrough Roller Derby
16 March 2013		77 - 180	Dundee Roller Girls
11 May 2013		91 - 171	Granite City Roller Girls
15 June 2013		110 - 191	Newcastle Roller Girls
5 October 2013		129 - 215	Barcelona Roller Derby
23 October 2013		71 - 170	Leeds Roller Derby B-team
1 March 2014		219 - 167	Furness Firecrackers
28 June 2014		133 - 177	Newcastle Roller Girls
27 September 2014		194 - 178	London Roller Derby Batter C Power
25 October 2014		143 - 181	Dundee Roller Girls
7 March 2015	West Track Story III	97 - 142	Kallio Rolling Rainbow Kinapori Fistfunkers
7 March 2015	West Track Story III	173 - 156	Bear City Roller Derby Wallbreakers
8 March 2015	West Track Story III	189 - 181	Amsterdam Roller Derby
8 March 2015	West Track Story III	185 - 158	Nantes Roller Derby
8 August 2015		103 - 281	Auld Reekie Roller Girls All-Star Reserves
12 September 2015		176 - 131	Manchester Roller Derby Checkerbroads
31 October 2015		89 - 263	Tampere Roller Derby
8 November 2015		141 - 229	Kallio Rolling Rainbow Kinapori Fistfunkers
11 June 2016		360 - 96	Tiger Bay Brawlers B-Bombs
27 August 2016		463 - 61	Granite City Roller Derby
15 April 2017		184 - 177	Blackpool Roller-Coasters
19 May 2018		170 - 207	Dundee Roller Derby Bonnie Colliders
18 August 2018		225 - 207	Auld Reekie Roller Derby All-Star Reserves
30 March 2019		149 - 179	Bairn City Rollers
28 April 2019		214 - 136	Leicestershire Dolly Rockit Rollers Rockin' Rockets
1 June 2019		138 - 254	Brighton Rockers Roller Derby Rockerbillies
9 November 2019		248 - 130	Brighton Rockers Roller Derby

=== Cannie Gingers ===
The Cannie Gingers were Glasgow Roller Derby's short-lived C team, active from early 2014 to late 2015.

Breakdown of results
Total	Won	Lost
8	6	2

Date	Result	Opponents
15 February 2014	216 - 177	Fierce Valley Roller Girls Parma Violents
14 June 2014	145 - 213	Furness Firecrackers The Flaming Noras
23 August 2014	140 - 396	Fierce Valley Roller Girls Parma Violents
4 October 2014	248 - 92	Bairn City Rollers
21 February 2015	60 - 286	New Town Roller Derby
21 February 2015	72 - 207	Voodoo Roller Dollies
11 July 2015	112 - 265	Bairn City Rollers
14 November 2015	217 - 33	Voodoo Roller Dollies

Preceded by New competition	British Roller Derby Championships Tier 1 Champions; 2015	Succeeded by Newcastle Roller Girls
