= Liverpool Roller Birds =

Roller Derby League

- Metro area: Liverpool
- Country: UK
- Founded: November 2009
- Teams: Sisters Of Mersey (A team); Yellow Shovemarines (B team); Slambananas (C team)
- Venue: Greenbank Sports Academy
- Affiliations: WFTDA
- Website: https://www.liverpoolrollerbirds.co.uk/

The Liverpool Roller Birds (LRB) are a flat-track roller derby team based in Liverpool, Merseyside. They joined the United Kingdom Roller Derby Association (UKRDA) in 2015, and became a member of the WFTDA Apprentice Program in December 2018. They graduated as full members of the Women's Flat Track Derby Association (WFTDA) in February 2019.

== League history ==
Dreamt up and named as skaters Mickey and Ginny Flynn travelled home from roller derby practice in Manchester, the league came into being in November 2009 with initial support from Rainy City Roller Derby.

The league made their game debut at the 2010 Great Yorkshire Showdown tournament in Huddersfield, taking on Sheffield Steel Roller Derby and losing 121–28.

In 2019, Liverpool participated in their first WFTDA tournament after gaining full membership earlier in the year. This was Chaos on the Clyde 2019, hosted by Glasgow Roller Derby, where they faced Glasgow's Irn Bruisers (A), and Kent Roller Derby as well as having an unsanctioned game against Auld Reekie Roller Derby's All-Star Reserves. They lost narrowly to Glasgow, 151–147, before coming back stronger and beating Kent 271–91. They were also the only team to beat the Edinburgh B-team 184–131.

The Birds are featured to represent Health and Wellbeing amongst the artefacts in the Museum of Liverpool, including a programme from a 2016 doubleheader. The games in question were the Yellow Shovemarines vs Sheffield Steel Roller Derby' Crucibelles, and the Yellow Shovemarines against Vagine Regime UK, an exhibition team made of LGBTQ+ skaters. The league's Bethany Gwynn-Adams (Pen Gwyn) is quoted on the inclusivity of roller derby, saying "patterns of LGBT acceptance crop up in other teams as well, roller derby just seems to attract us and I can see why!"

== League Structure ==
Liverpool Roller Birds have two travel teams: the Sisters of Mersey (A) and the Yellow Shovemarines (B).

New skaters to the league are referred to as 'Hatchlings.'

== WFTDA competition ==
=== Rankings ===
Season	Final ranking	Playoffs	Championship
2019	192 WFTDA	DNQ	DNQ
2020	211 WFTDA	NPS	NPS
2023	31 Europe	NPS	NPS
2024	36 Europe	DNQ	DNQ

- NPS = no postseason
- No final rankings 2020-2022 due to the COVID-19 pandemic

== Five Nations Roller Derby Championships ==
First taking part in the British Championships in 2015, Liverpool Roller Birds competed in the Women T3 North division. In their first game they won against Sheffield Steel Roller Derby 218–77. Their winning streak continued against Granite City Roller Derby 284–111, and Dundee Roller Derby 152–115. The wind was somewhat taken from underneath the Birds' wings by the Furness Firecrackers who beat them 165–126, but they went on to 131–259 against Halifax Bruising Banditas to round off the competition.

These results led to promotion for the 2016 competition to the Women Tier 2 North division. With promotion came greater challenges and Liverpool lost 234–120 to Hot Wheel Roller Derby, then lost their next game 189–123 to the Cambridge Rollerbillies. They beat Belfast Roller Derby Banshees 232–70, lost 299–97 to Birmingham Blitz Dames.

Changes to the Championships structure in saw Liverpool Roller Birds placed in the Women's T2 UKRDA National division. After an inauspicious start, losing 216–96 to the Manchester Roller Derby Checkerbroads, they went on to beat their next two opponents, seeing off Newcastle Roller Derby Whippin' Hinnies (B) 391–138, and Cambridge Rollerbillies 240–120. Liverpool suffered defeat at the skates of Rainy City Roller Derby Tender Hooligans (B) 193–111, but soared to a 178–136 win against Wirral Roller Derby's Savage Lilies.

In 2018, they moved up to the Women's T1 UKRDA Premier division. After an initial defeat by Central City Roller Derby 122–187, they won 274–112 against Glasgow Roller Derby, and 200–185 against London Rockin' Rollers.

This strong performance saw them competing in the same division in 2019: Women's T1 Premier. This year they were undefeated, beating London Roller Derby's Batter C Power 305–120, Manchester Roller Derby's Checkerbroads 256–145, Sheffield Steel Roller Derby 316–96, Auld Reekie Roller Derby's All-Star Reserves 292–133, Rainy City Roller Derby's Revolution (B) 328–141, and going for a repeat with Manchester Roller Derby's Checkerbroads, beating them 128–239.

The competition rebranded in 2021 from the "British Roller Derby Championships" to the Five Nations Roller Derby Championships.

== In The Media ==
In 2015, Liverpool Roller Birds were front and centre of a This Girl Can campaign, run by Sport England, to promote sport among women. A-team jammer, Pops, was chosen as the face of roller derby in the city and her image was plastered larger-than-life on a billboard in Walton, Liverpool. Another skater, Cali Floor’ya, was interviewed on the BBC Radio Merseyside breakfast show, and Pops and her teammates were the stars of a short video for the campaign.

Highlighting the inclusivity of roller derby, Viki Tidser (Tids) represented the league in an article on LGBTQ+ Liverpudlians.

Becky Currie (derby name Becky Ruckus), a skater with the league who has also represented her country in Team England, was featured in the Liverpool Echo as one of the city's "30 under 30".

For the league's tenth anniversary in 2019, they were again featured in the local press, showcasing the breadth of talent and life experience in the league.

== National team representation ==
Becky Ruckus made it onto the final training roster for Team England for the 2018 Roller Derby World Cup, but wasn't in the final squad. Tids (Viki Tidser) played for Team Scotland Roller Derby at the 2018 Roller Derby World Cup.
