= Roller derby in Germany =

By September 2011, there were more than 1,000 amateur roller derby leagues on every inhabited continent in countries such as Canada, Australia, the United Kingdom, New Zealand, Germany, Belgium, Finland, Sweden and Singapore.

Stuttgart Valley Roller Derby was the first roller derby league to be formed in Germany and the second in Europe, being set up in April 2006. In 2008, they assisted Bear City Roller Derby in establishing itself in Berlin, and by the end of 2009, there were seven leagues in the country.

In October 2010, Bear City was accepted as the first German apprentice member of the WFTDA.

The first German Championship was held in 2010, Stuttgart beating Bear City Roller Derby 128–124 in the final.

== Leagues ==
- Berlin, Germany – Bear City Roller Derby
- Bremen, Germany – Meatgrinders
- Essen, Germany - Ruhrpott Roller Derby
- Frankfurt, Germany – Bembel Town Roller Derby
- Frankfurt, Germany – Roller Derby Frankfurt
- Hamburg, Germany – St. Pauli Roller Derby
- Kaiserslautern, Germany – Kaiserslautern Roller Derby
- Karlsruhe, Germany – rocKArollers
- Köln, Germany – Cologne Roller Derby
- Leipzig, Germany - Rolling Raptors
- Ludwigsburg, Germany – Barockcity Rollerderby
- Mannheim, Germany - Rhein-Neckar Delta Quads
- München, Germany – Munich Rolling Rebels
- Oberhausen, Germany - Mine Monsters
- Stuttgart, Germany – Stuttgart Valley Roller Derby

== Roller Derby World Cup ==
=== 2011 ===
The first Roller Derby World Cup took place in 2011 from December 1 until December 4 in Toronto, Ontario, Canada.

The first Team Germany roster featured skaters from Stuttgart Valley Roller Derby, Bear City Roller Derby, Barock City Roller Derby, Harbor Girls Hamburg (St. Pauli Roller Derby), Philly Roller Derby and Ruhrpott Roller Derby.

Opponent	Score	Result
Team Australia	136-53	Loss
Team Finland	104-80	Win
Team New Zealand	127-143	Loss
Team Scotland	41-104	Win
Team Ireland	60-116	Win

=== 2014 ===
The second Roller Derby World Cup took place in 2014 from December 4 to December 7 in Dallas, Texas.

Opponent	Score	Result
England Roller Derby	272-31	Loss
Team Ireland	129-142	Loss
Team Spain	216-70	Win
Selección Chilena de Roller Derby	166-330	Win

=== 2018 ===
The 2018 Roller Derby World Cup took place from February 1–4, 2018 in Manchester, England. Team Germany came in 13th place out of 38 teams.

Team Germany played the second highest-scoring bout in the 2018 World Cup, scoring 610 against Team Czech Republic. The only other two teams to score over 600 points in a single bout were Team Sweden against Russia (635-6) and Team Scotland (13-604) against Team Iceland.

Opponent	Score	Result
Team Finland Roller Derby	131-53	Loss
Team Scotland Roller Derby	95-77	Win
Team Czech Republic	99-610	Win
Team Belgium	218-139	Win
Team Ireland	143-108	Win

== See also ==
- Roller derby
