= Cork City Firebirds =

Roller derby league

- Metro area: Cork
- Country: Ireland
- Founded: 2011
- Teams: Firebirds
- Track type(s): Flat
- Venue: Little Island Sports Complex

The Cork City Firebirds (CCF) are a roller derby league based in Cork in Ireland. Founded in 2011, the league consists of a single team, which competes against teams from other leagues.

Founded in June 2011, the Firebirds were, with the Dublin Roller Girls, one of the first two bouting leagues in Ireland. Despite the league's recent formation, three of its skaters were selected to play for Team Ireland Roller Derby at the 2011 Roller Derby World Cup: Crow Jane, Phantom Jemerald and Rush'n Barron.

The league has played against teams from the Amsterdam Derby Dames, Crime City Rollers and Copenhagen Roller Derby.
