= Nottingham Hellfire Harlots Roller Derby =

Roller derby league

- Metro area: Nottingham
- Country: United Kingdom
- Founded: 2010
- Dissolved: 2023
- Track type: Flat
- Venue: Nottingham Trent University
- Affiliations: WFTDA
- Website: www.hellfire-harlots.co.uk

Nottingham Hellfire Harlots Roller Derby was a flat track roller derby league based in Nottingham, England. Founded in April 2010, the league had two travel teams who played against teams from other leagues. It was a member of the United Kingdom Roller Derby Association (UKRDA) and the Women's Flat Track Derby Association (WFTDA). The league announced their disbanding on 3 August 2023, citing the difficulties with continuing to run a grassroots sports team.

== History ==
The league was founded in May 2010 by seven former members of Nottingham Roller Derby. The main focus was to create a driven and, most importantly, competitive amateur sporting team. They initially trained at Sport Nottingham, but lost access to the venue and, after a long search, moved to the Djanogly City Academy before finally setting up their permanent home at Southglade Leisure Centre.

In December 2011, the Hellfire Harlots won the Broxtowe Sports Club of the Year award. Later that year, the league joined the UK Roller Derby Association. In October 2012, the Harlots were accepted as a member of the WFTDA Apprentice Program, and became a full member in December 2013.

In May 2014, the Hellfire Harlots took part in the Nottingham Playhouse's tribute to Torvill and Dean, Mass Bolero, and can be seen towards the end of the piece.

In February 2015, the Hellfire Harlots won their first British Champs game against Hot Wheel Roller Derby in their first Tier 2 British Roller Derby Championships.

The Hellfire Harlots also took part in their first WFTDA tournament, "A Skate Odyssey", hosted by GO-GO Gent Roller Derby, in Ghent 15–17 May 2015.

In April 2016, the Hellfire Harlots took part in West Track Story IV, hosted by Nantes Roller Derby, in Nantes.

In January 2017, the Hellfire Harlots took part in WFTDA tournament Slip It, hosted by Roller Derby Caen, in France 28-29 January. The same year the league hosted their first European Track Attack 2017 tournament at Lee Westwood sports centre located at Nottingham Trent University. Teams featured were Brussels Derby Pixies, Dundee Roller Girls and Leeds Roller Derby. In November 2017, the Hellfire Harlots took part in Brabo Cup, hosted by Antwerp Roller Derby, in Belgium.

In April 2018 saw the Hellfire Harlots return to ''West Track Story VI tournament'', hosted by Nantes Roller Derby. Hellfire Harlots took the win after winning every single one of their games. In October 2018, the league hosted for the second time their European tournament Track Attack 2018 at Lee Westwood sports centre. Teams featured were Antwerp Roller Derby, Amsterdam Roller Derby and Crime City B Team.

In September 2018, the Hellfire Harlots hosted 'Harlot Fest', a night of celebrating local music in Nottingham.

The league consisted of skaters, non-skating officials and referees. As with most roller derby leagues (especially outside of North America), they were non-profit and funded by both league membership and fundraising activities. The league had a committee made up of current league members, and all positions were voluntary. The main ethos was "by the skaters, for the skaters". The team motto encompassed this; "Together. All of us."

== National Team Representation ==
The league's el VISIOUS skated for Team England at the 2011 Roller Derby World Cup.

At the 2018 Roller Derby World Cup, Katie Tokarski was part of the Team Ireland Roller Derby training squad.

== WFTDA rankings ==
Season	Final ranking	Playoffs	Championship
2014	142 WFTDA	DNQ	DNQ
2015	173 WFTDA	DNQ	DNQ
2016	280 WFTDA	DNQ	DNQ
2017	137 WFTDA	DNQ	DNQ
2018	95 WFTDA	DNQ	DNQ
2019	77 WFTDA	DNQ	DNQ
2020	77 WFTDA	DNQ	DNQ

*Please note that rankings were suspended in March 2020 in light of the COVID-19 pandemic.
