= Granite City Roller Derby =

Roller derby league

- Metro area: Aberdeen
- Country: United Kingdom
- Founded: 2008
- Teams: Northern Fights (A team); The Fight Hawks (B team)
- Track type: Flat
- Venue: Beach Leisure Centre
- Website: https://www.facebook.com/GraniteCityRollerDerby/

Granite City Roller Derby (GCRD) is a roller derby league based in Aberdeen, Scotland. Founded in 2008, the league currently have three teams which compete with teams from other leagues.

== League structure ==
The league has three travel teams:

- Northern Fights (A, established 2008)
- The Fight Hawks (B, established June 2015)
- The Northern Knights (OTA, established April 2024)

== League history ==
Originating as the Aberdeen Aces, GCRD were the second roller derby league established in Scotland. The league struggled in the early days to find a training hall to practice in and resorted to skating in a local car park when weather allowed. In November 2008, the league began skating at the Aberdeen Lads Club, and was reborn as the "Granite City Roller Girls".

In May 2010, the league hosted Scotland's first roller derby tournament, "Highland Fling". This was attended by Glasgow Roller Girls, Auld Reekie Roller Girls and Dundee Roller Girls. The league's A-team, the Northern Fights, came a respectable fourth in the competition out of 6 teams taking part. The tournament was attended by around 650 people over the course of the two days.

GCRD have been members of the United Kingdom Roller Derby Association since 2011. Thought they aren't members of the association, they play to the Women's Flat Track Derby Association (WFTDA) ruleset.

In June 2012, team captain Clinically Wasted (Carolyn Mackenzie) took part in the 2012 Summer Olympics torch relay, carrying the Torch through the local town of Peterculter.

In August 2013, The Northern Fights emerged victorious in the first ever "Quad Nations" tournament, hosted by Swansea City Roller Derby. The competition was between four teams representing England (Severn Roller Torrent), Northern Ireland (Belfast Roller Derby), Wales (Swansea City Roller Derby) and Scotland (Granite City Roller Derby).

In June 2015, Granite City's B team, The Fight Hawks, was formed. On 12 September 2015 they made their debut at the Jack Kane Sports Centre, beating Lothian Derby Dolls 157 – 147.

They also took part in 2016's "ARRGmageddon", an all-Scottish tournament hosted by Auld Reekie Roller Derby which took place in November 2016.

GCRD received a revamp and a name change to Granite City Roller Derby in November 2015.

== Five Nations Roller Derby Championships ==
The league took part in the inaugural British Roller Derby Championships in 2015, qualifying for the Women T3 North tier. They lost four of their five games, against Dundee Roller Derby, Sheffield Steel Roller Derby, Liverpool Roller Birds and Furness Firecrackers, but beat Halifax Bruising Banditas.

The Northern Fights took part in the 2016 competition and placed first in Tier 4 North, having won all three of their games against Spa Town Roller Derby, Blackpool Roller-Coasters and Halifax Bruising Banditas.

This earned them promotion, and they moved up to Tier 3 North for 2017, ultimately coming first in their section. To achieve this, they played Bath Roller Derby, Rebellion Roller Derby, Dolly Rockit Rollers, Furness Firecrackers, Halifax Bruising Banditas, North Wales Roller Derby, Auld Reekie Roller Derby's All-Star Reserves (B) and Spa Town Roller Derby. The Fights went on to Tier 3 Playoffs and placed third overall.

In 2018, they lined up in the Women's T3 Regional tier and won three-quarters of their games, beating Wakey Wheeled Cats, Halifax Bruising Banditas and Hallam Hellcats Roller Derby, and losing to Nottingham Roller Derby.

They were elevated to the Women's T2 National tier in 2019, and lost all their games, defeated by Wirral Roller Derby, Hallam Hellcats Roller Derby, Arcadia Roller Derby and Hulls Angels Roller Derby.

The competition rebranded in 2021 from the "British Roller Derby Championships" to the Five Nations Roller Derby Championships.

== National team representation ==
The league contributed two skaters, Carolyn Mackenzie (derby name Clinically Wasted) and Fight Cub (previously of Auld Reekie Roller Girls) to Team Scotland Roller Derby for the inaugural 2011 Roller Derby World Cup.

For the 2014 Roller Derby World Cup, the pair made a return to the Scottish roster, joined by teammate Jill Simpson (Rock'n Riot).

Rock'n Riot stayed on for the Team Scotland 2018 Roller Derby World Cup roster, with Jo Mamma by her side.
