= Bath Roller Derby =

Roller derby league

- Metro area: Bath
- Country: England
- Founded: 14th of September 2012
- Teams: Bath Spartans (A), Bath Romans (B), Bath Gladiators
- Track type: Flat
- Venues: Wellsway School, Keynsham, Beechen Cliff
- Website: http://www.bathrollerderby.co.uk/

Bath Roller Derby is a roller derby league based in Bath, Somerset. Founded in 2012, the league plays to the Women's Flat Track Derby Association (WFTDA) ruleset. The league runs on a "DIY and voluntary ethos" with an elected committee and sub-groups.

== League History ==
The league was founded in 2012 by several local skaters as Bath Roller Derby Girls but rebranded in 2018 and dropped the 'Girls'. They held their first public session in September 2012 and henceforth began holding regular training sessions. Half a year later, the league held their second recruitment intake and numbers begun to increase with a third intake following in November of that year.

In April 2014, they played their first international game against Lisbon Grrrls Roller Derby, taking home a 152–132 victory.

Bath won the 2018 Bath Sports Awards' Community Club of the Year award in 2018.

League skater Amy Buller (derby name Scarlett O’ Harma) died of breast cancer in September 2020, and the league have since hosted the "Peeka Hurt You Cup" in celebration of her life and to raise money for Dorothy House, a local hospice charity.

== League Structure ==
The league currently has two teams drawn from all league skaters:

- Bath Spartans (A Team)
- Bath Roman Rollers (B Team).

The Bath Gladiators team is made up of those skaters not currently drafted to a Travel Team or currently injured and not skating. The Bath Skeleton Crew is the league's official crew, providing skating and non-skating officials (NSOs) for home and away games.

== Five Nations Roller Derby Championships ==
The league participated in the British Roller Derby Championships 2015 Women T4 South West tier. They played Wiltshire Roller Derby, North Devon Roller Derby, Bridgend Roller Derby and Riot City Ravens, winning three out of their four games. This performance qualified them for Women T4 Playoffs - Western, where they won against North Wales Roller Derby, 165–128, but lost to Wirral Roller Derby's Savage Lilies, 294–78.

In 2016, they found themselves in Women Tier 3 South. They had a difficult start to the competition, losing their first four games against North Devon Roller Derby, Kent Roller Derby, Cornwall Roller Derby and Surrey Roller Girls, before beating Plymouth City Roller Derby.

A restructured tournament in 2017 saw the league in the Women's T3 Regional tier. They faced Granite City Roller Derby, Norfolk Roller Derby, Sheffield Steel Roller Derby, North Devon Roller Derby, Dorset Roller Girls, Riot City Ravens and Cornwall Roller Derby.

In 2018, they were promoted to Women's T2 UKRDA National in a further-restructured competition. They won their game against North Devon Roller Derby, but lost all their other games against SWAT Roller Derby, Royal Windsor Roller Derby, London Roller Derby's Batter C Power (C).

Their performance qualified them in 2019 to compete in the Women's T1 Premier tier. They faced up to London Roller Derby's Batter C Power, Norfolk Roller Derby, SWAT Roller Derby and Cambridge Rollerbillies.

In 2021, the British Championships rebranded as the Five Nations Roller Derby Championships.

== Ranked Games ==
The table below lists the bouts played by Bath Roller Derby Girls as recorded by Flat Track Stats

Date	Event	Home/Away	Team	Opponent	Results	Won by'
5 April 2014	Day of the Bruises	Away	Bath Roller Derby Girls	Lisbon Grrrls	151-132	BRDG
3 May 2014	Ruthless Romans	Away	Bath Roller Derby Girls	Neath Port Talbot Roller Derby	130-160	NPT
24 May 2014	Rumble in the Docks: Lairy Rose	Away	Bath Roller Derby Girls	Portsmouth Roller Wenches	102-236	PRW
14 June 2014	Unnamed	Away	Bath Roller Derby Girls	Swansea City Roller Derby (B)	152-156	SCRD (B)
27 September 2014	Blood Bath	Home	Bath Roller Derby Girls	Devon Clotted Screamers	200-136	BRDG
25 October 2014	Unnamed	Home	Bath Roller Derby Girls	Neath Port Talbot Roller Derby	187-237	NPT
7 February 2015	Shove Me Tender	Home	Bath Roller Derby Girls	Grid City	172-210	GCD
21 February 2015	Unnamed	Away	Bath Roller Derby Girls	Cornwall Roller Derby (B)	313-28	BRDG
14 March 2015	SW:UK 2015	Away	Bath Roman Rollers	Severn Roller Torrent (B)	175-89	BRDG (B)
29 March 2015	British Championships	Away	Bath Spartans	Riot City Ravens	325-108	BRDG
11 April 2015	Unnamed	Home	Bath Spartans	Swansea City Roller Derby (B)	380-115	BRDG
11 April 2015	SW:UK 2015	Home	Bath Roman Rollers	Bristol Roller Derby (B)	127-341	BRD (B)
16 May 2015	British Championships	Away	Bath Spartans	Bridgend Roller Derby	369-93	BRDG
21 June 2015	British Championships	Away	Bath Spartans	Grin 'N' Barum	137-142	GNB
18 July 2015	Unnamed	Away	Bath Spartans	Cork City Firebirds	198-122	BRDG
18 July 2015	Unnamed	Away	Bath Roman Rollers	Galway She Devils	257-185	BRDG (B)
22 August 2015	British Championships	Home	Bath Spartans	Wiltshire		

== Unranked Events ==
This table lists unranked and one-day tournament events in which BRDG has competed

Date	Event	Home/Away	Teams	Results	Won by
22 November 2014	SK8 Britain Tournament	Away	Bath Roller Derby Girls, Suffolk Roller Derby, Grid City Division, Killa Hurtz Roller Girls, Voodoo Roller Dollies, Devon Clotted Screamers, Wrexham Rejects, Riverside Rebels	1st	BRDG
