= Go-Go Gent Roller Derby =

Roller derby league

GO-GO Gent Roller Derby
- Metro area: Ghent
- Country: Belgium
- Founded: 2008
- Teams: All Stars (travel team); Cubs (B team)
- Track type(s): Flat
- Affiliations: WFTDA
- Website: www.gogogent.be

GO-GO Gent Roller Derby is a women's flat track roller derby league based in Ghent, Belgium. Founded in 2009, the league currently consists of an All-star travel team and a B-team which compete against teams from other leagues. GO-GO Gent is a member of the Women's Flat Track Derby Association (WFTDA).

== History ==
GO-GO Gent Roller Girls was the first roller derby league in Belgium, with the Antwerp-based One Love Roller Dolls quickly following their lead. GO-GO Gent was accepted as apprentice members of the Women's Flat Track Derby Association in January 2011, and graduated to full membership in December 2012. In December 2011, GO-GO Gent and One Love were named as the top two Belgian leagues by Het Laatste Nieuws.

Their intraleague home bout in January 2011 was the first ever roller derby event to be organized in Belgium. The Mad Megs beat the Bells of Mayhem and the league instantly gained a fanbase in their hometown.

== Bouts ==
The GO-GO Gent travel team was victorious in their bouts against the Paris Rollergirls and RuhrPott RollerGirls. Other previous opponents include the Stuttgart Valley Rollergirlz, Bear City Roller Derby and Copenhagen Roller Derby. They hosted the Brighton Rockers Roller Derby travel team on their Think Pink! breastcancer awareness themed home bout on 10 March 2012.

== WFTDA rankings ==
Season	Final ranking	Playoffs	Championship
2013	150 WFTDA	DNQ	DNQ
2014	145 WFTDA	DNQ	DNQ
2015	133 WFTDA	DNQ	DNQ
2016	184 WFTDA	DNQ	DNQ
2017	165 WFTDA	DNQ	DNQ
2018	289 WFTDA	DNQ	DNQ
