= Belfast Roller Derby =

Roller derby league

- Metro area: Belfast
- Country: Northern Ireland
- Founded: 2010
- Teams: Belfast Banshees (A), Norn Iron Maidens (B)
- Track type(s): Flat
- Venue: Valley Leisure Centre
- Affiliations: WFTDA, Irish Roller Derby Association
- Website: https://belfastrollerderby.com/

Belfast Roller Derby (BRD) is a flat track roller derby league based in Belfast, Northern Ireland. Founded in January 2010, the league consists of two teams that play teams from other leagues, and is a member of the Women's Flat Track Derby Association (WFTDA).

== History ==
Belfast Roller Derby was founded in 2010, by skater Hannah Whitall (derby name Hannahbolic Steroids). With increasing interest in the sport throughout the UK, helped by the release of the film Whip It in 2009, the league was able to arrange training with skaters from Dublin and Glasgow. BRD was the first roller derby league in Northern Ireland, founded six months after Dublin Roller Derby, the first league in Ireland.

BRD played its first home bout in December 2011 as an intraleague competition with the Titanic Titans and the Hellfast City Hit-Girls.

In 2018, Belfast City Rockets merged with the league.

== Affiliations ==
In May 2012, BRD was accepted as a member of the United Kingdom Roller Derby Association.

The league has been sponsored by Lavery's Bar Belfast since January 2014. In May 2014, the league was accepted into the WFTDA Apprentice Program and became a full member league in December 2014. They are also members of the Irish Roller Derby Association (IRDA).

== Teams ==
From the outset of the league, the 'A' team has been known as the Belfast Banshees. They played their first bout against Dublin in February 2012. In 2013, the Norn Iron Maidens were formed as the BRD 'B' team and competed in their first major bout against the Limerick Roller Girls 'B' Team on 28 September 2013.

== National Team Representation ==
Six members of BRD - Hannah Whitall (Hannahbolic Steroids), Oonagh O'Flaherty (Maul'er Malone), Dani Mills (Ra-Ra Rasputina), Roisin McGrath (Jessica Rammit), Catherine Burns (Puscifer) and Patricia Hamilton (Patricia The Ripper) - were selected for the 2014 Team Ireland training squad. In September 2014, four were chosen to be part of Team Ireland at the 2014 Roller Derby World Cup: Maul'er Malone, Ra-Ra Rasputina, Puscifer and Jessica Rammit.

Maul'er Malone returned to Team Ireland Roller Derby for the 2018 Roller Derby World Cup and was joined by teammate Barbara Robinson.

== WFTDA rankings ==
Season	Final ranking	Playoffs	Championship
2015	248 WFTDA	DNQ	DNQ
2016	270 WFTDA	DNQ	DNQ
2017	333 WFTDA	DNQ	DNQ
2018	-	-	-
2019	320 WFTDA	DNQ	DNQ
2020	323 WFTDA	DNQ	DNQ

*Please note that rankings were suspended in March 2020 in light of the COVID-19 pandemic.

== Five Nations Roller Derby Championships ==
As members of the United Kingdom Roller Derby Association, Belfast took part in the British Roller Derby Championships 2015 as part of the Women T3 West tier. They won all their games, against Hereford Roller Derby, Nottingham Roller Derby's Arrows, Birmingham Blitz Dames, Dolly Rockit Rollers and Swansea City Roller Derby.

In 2016, they were promoted to Women Tier 2 North, but lost all their games, against Cambridge Rollerbillies, Liverpool Roller Birds and Hot Wheel Roller Derby.

After some time out, the league returned to the competition in 2019, in the Women's T3 Regional tier. They beat all their opponents: Cheshire Hellcats Roller Derby, Durham Roller Derby, Blackpool Roller-Coasters and Spa Town Roller Derby.

In 2021, the British Championships rebranded as the Five Nations Roller Derby Championships.
