= Copenhagen Roller Derby =

Women's flat track roller derby league

- Metro area: Copenhagen
- Country: Denmark
- Founded: 2009
- Teams: All Stars (A team); All Stars B (B team)
- Track type(s): Flat
- Venue: DGI-byen
- Affiliations: WFTDA
- Website: www.copenhagenrollerderby.com

Copenhagen Roller Derby (CRD) is a women's flat track roller derby league based in Copenhagen, Denmark. Founded in 2009, the league consists of two teams, which compete against teams from other leagues. Copenhagen Roller Derby is a member of the Women's Flat Track Derby Association (WFTDA).

== History ==
The league was founded in September 2009 by Charlie Hedman, a Swedish skater who had returned from a visit to the United States. Their internet posts calling for skaters to join the new league was seen by Ana Killingspree, a former skater with the Mad Rollin' Dolls who was then living in Aarhus. Together, the two built Copenhagen Roller Derby, which played its first bout in June 2010, winning against the Hamburg Harbor Girls. The league then played seven bouts in 2011, facing the Royal Windsor Rollergirls, Gent Go-Go Rollergirls, Bedfordshire Rollergirls, Berlin Bombshells, Crime City Rollers, Stockholm Roller Derby, Kallio Rollin Rainbow and the Hamburg Harbor Girls.

By the end of 2011, the league had 95 members, and was one of three active leagues in Denmark, the others being based in Aarhus and Odense. In October 2012, Copenhagen was accepted as a member of the Women's Flat Track Derby Association Apprentice Programme. Copenhagen graduated to full WFTDA membership in December 2013.

== WFTDA rankings ==
| Season | Final ranking | Playoffs | Championship |
|---|---|---|---|
| 2014 | 176 WFTDA | DNQ | DNQ |
| 2015 | 230 WFTDA | DNQ | DNQ |
| 2016 | 141 WFTDA | DNQ | DNQ |
| 2017 | 233 WFTDA | DNQ | DNQ |
| 2018 | 176 WFTDA | DNQ | DNQ |
