= Kallio Rolling Rainbow =

Roller derby league

- Metro area: Helsinki
- Country: Finland
- Founded: 2010
- Teams: Kallio All Colours (A team); Kinapori Fistfunkers (B team); Piritorin Ässät (C team); Fisters of Mercy; Les Bombas; Suppopäät/Superbad
- Track type: Flat
- Venue: Pasila Sportshall
- Affiliations: WFTDA; Southern Finland Sports and Athletics Association
- Website: www.kalliorollingrainbow.fi

Kallio Rolling Rainbow (KRR) is a flat track roller derby league based in Helsinki, Finland.They welcome anyone regardless of age, gender or body type. Their fundamental value is to accept people exactly as they are and to celebrate the existence of every colour of the rainbow. Founded in 2010, the league consists of three teams. Kallio is a member of the Women's Flat Track Derby Association (WFTDA).

== International presence ==
Three skaters from Kallio (Misbitch, Pink Spanker and Udre) were selected to play for Team Finland at the 2011 Roller Derby World Cup in Toronto, and a higher proportion of the squad for the 2014 Cup came from the league. A number of skaters from the league joined Team Finland for the 2018 Cup with Kallio skater Sara Gilbert being awarded the title of Best Jammer. Several Kallio players are joining Team Finland for the 2025 Roller Derby World Cup in Innsbruck, Austria.

== Finnish National Series ==
Kallio Rolling Rainbow holds the record for the most Finnish Championship wins. It has won the championship five times and currently holds the title of Finnish Champion in both the Finnish Championship Series and Finnish Division 1.

In 2013 Kallio played in the first Suomi Cup of Roller Derby (Finnish Championship), winning the tournament by defeating Helsinki Roller Derby in the final. Kallio has later won the national series also in 2015, 2016, 2024, 2025 and 2026.

Kallio has won the Finnish Division 1 series three times, in 2024, 2025 and 2026.

== WFTDA competition ==
In October 2013, Kallio was accepted as a member of the Women's Flat Track Derby Association Apprentice Program, and became a full member in July 2014.

In 2016, Kallio qualified for their first appearance at WFTDA Division 1 Playoffs, entering the Montreal tournament as the seventh seed, ultimately going winless and finishing the weekend in tenth place.

In 2017 Kallio was the ninth seed at the Malmö Division 1 Playoff but again went winless, losing 269–162 to Detroit Roller Derby and to Stockholm Roller Derby, 184–166.

In 2018, Kallio qualified for the WFTDA European Continental Cup held in Birmingham, England as the first seed, and went undefeated in capturing first place against Middlesbrough Roller Derby, Tiger Bay Brawlers, and Dublin Roller Derby to secure the Continental Cup title.

In 2019, Kallio hosted the WFTDA European Continental Cup, and came in third place, maintaining their third seed spot. Their first match was against the sixth-seeded Central City Roller Derby where Kallio took the win 142-127. Kallio lost to Dock City Roller Derby, the second-seeded team with a score of 140-223.

=== Rankings ===
| Season | Final ranking | Playoffs | Championship |
|---|---|---|---|
| 2014 | 126 WFTDA | N/A | N/A |
| 2015 | 86 WFTDA | DNQ | DNQ |
| 2016 | 30 WFTDA | 10 D1 | DNQ |
| 2017 | 28 WFTDA | CR D1 | DNQ |
| 2018 | 37 WFTDA | 1 CC Europe | N/A |
| 2019 | 35 WFTDA | 3 CC Europe | DNQ |
| 2023 | 37 Europe | NPS | NPS |
| 2024 | 26 Europe | DNQ | DNQ |

- CR = consolation round
- CC = Continental Cup
- no rankings 2020-2022 due to COVID-19 pandemic
- NPS = no postseason due to COVID-19 pandemic

| Preceded by event created | WFTDA Continental Cup Europe winners 2018 | Succeeded by incumbent |
