= Next World Cup =

This is a list of the next scheduled events designated as "World Cup". There are a number of notable world cups in popular sports. Such a competition is generally considered the premier competition in its sport, with the victor attaining the highest honour in that sport and able to lay claim to the title of their sport's best.

== Basketball ==
- 2018 FIBA Women's Basketball World Cup

== Cricket ==
- 2019 Cricket World Cup
- 2018 Under-19 Cricket World Cup
- 2021 Women's Cricket World Cup

== Football ==
=== Association football ===
- 2030 FIFA World Cup

=== Rugby ===
- 2018 Rugby World Cup Sevens
- 2019 Rugby World Cup
- 2021 Rugby League World Cup

== Hockey ==
Field hockey

- 2018 Men's Hockey World Cup
- 2018 Women's Hockey World Cup

== Netball ==
- 2019 Netball World Cup

== Tennis ==
- 2018 Davis Cup
- 2018 Fed Cup

== Water sports ==
- 2018 Canoe Slalom World Cup

== Winter sports ==
- 2017–18 FIS Alpine Ski World Cup
- 2017–18 Bobsleigh World Cup

== Other sports ==
- 2018 Roller Derby World Cup
