= Roller Derby Germany =

Roller Derby team

- Founded: 2011
- Colors: Black, red and gold
- Championships: 9th place at 2011 Roller Derby World Cup
- Broadcasters: Derby News Network
- Website: rollerderbygermany.de

Roller Derby Germany represents Germany in women's international roller derby, in events such as the Roller Derby World Cup. The team was first formed to compete at the 2011 Roller Derby World Cup and finished the tournament in ninth place.

At the World Cup, Germany lost in round one to Team New Zealand, by 143 to 127. In the consolation stage, it easily beat Team Scotland, then also beat Ireland to finish ninth.

The 2018 German team finished in 13th place at the 2018 Roller Derby World Cup in Manchester.

== Team roster ==
=== 2011 team roster ===
The team named an initial roster of twenty skaters: (league affiliations listed as of at the time of the announcement)

Number	Name	League
66	BamBule	Bear City Roller Derby
3	Call of Booty	Ruhrpott Roller Girls
00	Chibi Abuser	Stuttgart Valley Rollergirlz
8	Ellie Minate	Stuttgart Valley Rollergirlz
0	Heavy Miss Gale	Harbor Girls Hamburg
505	Heavy Rotation	Bear City Roller Derby
10	Kiddo	Bear City Roller Derby
4	Kitty Carrera	Stuttgart Valley Rollergirlz
0049	Mercedes	Philly Rollergirls
17	Noxious Angel	Stuttgart Valley Rollergirlz
13	Polly Purgatory	Stuttgart Valley Rollergirlz
67	Psycho Annie	Ruhrpott Roller Girls
1	Public Enemy	Stuttgart Valley Rollergirlz
28	Resident Shevil	Bear City Roller Derby
85D	Silicon Sally	Stuttgart Valley Rollergirlz
101	Snowblood	Stuttgart Valley Rollergirlz
35	Spacy Tracy	Barock City Roller Derby
9	Sweet Gwenrolline	Ruhrpott Roller Girls
81	Titty Twista	Stuttgart Valley Rollergirlz
80	Vegas	Stuttgart Valley Rollergirlz
