= Spain national team =

The Spain national team, Spain team or Team Spain may refer to:

- Spain national American football team
- Spain national badminton team
- Spain national baseball team
- Spain men's national basketball team
- Spain women's national basketball team
- Spain national beach handball team
- Spain national beach soccer team
- Spain women's national beach soccer team
- Spain national cricket team
- Spain Davis Cup team
- Spain men's national field hockey team
- Spain national football team
- Spain women's national football team
- Spain national futsal team
- Spain men's national handball team
- Spain men's national ice hockey team
- Spain men's national lacrosse team
- Spain national quidditch team
- Spain national roller hockey team
- Spain national rugby league team
- Spain national rugby union team
- Spain men's national squash team
- Spain men's national volleyball team
- Spain men's national water polo team
- Spain women's national water polo team
- Team Spain (roller derby)
