= Roller Derby Madrid =

- Metro area: Madrid
- Country: Spain
- Founded: 2012
- Track type: Flat
- Website: http://www.rollerderbymadrid.com/

Roller Derby Madrid (RDM) is a flat-track roller derby league based in Madrid, Spain and founded in 2012. The league plays by the rule set of the Women's Flat Track Derby Association (WFTDA).

== History ==
Roller Derby Madrid was founded in 2012, following the fusion of two teams that had existed since 2011, GhostMakers Roller Derby and Hijas del Chotis Derby Crew. Their first bout took place in April 2013 against Rayo Dockers Valencia, which they won with a final score of 165 to 144. Since then they have continued bouting against national and international teams. The league has over fifty members, including a crew of eight referees. In 2016 eight of Roller Derby Madrid's skaters were selected as part of Team Spain (roller derby)'s initial roster for the 2017 World Cup.

=== Las Gatas ===
The league's logo features an illustration of a cat, a reference to a nickname given to people who are from Madrid. This is a recurring motif for the league, as their competing skaters are informally called "Gatas" (cats) and their new skaters (those who have not yet passed their WFTDA Minimum Skills test) are known as "Mininas" (kitties). Their main uniform is red with black animal stripes.

== Structure and management ==
Roller Derby Madrid is composed of skaters, referees and non-skating officials. It has been completely self-governed and democratic since its inception and is run by committees. In 2016 Roller Derby Madrid's B team was formed, made up of the newest players of the league as well as some crossover players from the A team.

== Media ==
Roller Derby Madrid has been featured in print, radio, television and online media. In 2014 they were the subject of the short documentary Lead Jammer.

== WFTDA competition ==
| Season | Final ranking | Playoffs | Championship |
|---|---|---|---|
| 2017 | 244 WFTDA | DNQ | DNQ |
| 2018 | 231 WFTDA | DNQ | DNQ |
| 2019 | 102 WFTDA | DNQ | DNQ |
| 2023-2024 | 17 Europe | DNQ | DNQ |

- no postseason 2020-2022 due to COVID-19 pandemic
