= Team Ireland Roller Derby =

National roller derby team for Ireland

- Founded: 2011
- Colors: Green and white
- Head coach: Al Timmins, Kevin Tierney, Catherine Hemelryk
- Manager: Jenny Cooney
- Championships: 10th place at Roller Derby World Cup 2011, 2014, 14th at 2018
- Broadcasters: Derby News Network
- Website: teamirelandrollerderby.com

Team Ireland Roller Derby represents Ireland in women's international roller derby, in events such as the Roller Derby World Cup. Affectionately known as the "Green Machine", the team was first formed to compete at the 2011 Roller Derby World Cup, and finished the tournament in tenth place. They have since competed at the 2014 World Cup in Dallas, USA and the 2018 World Cup in Manchester, UK. In 2025 the team will be again be competing at the World Cup in Innsbruck, Austria.

== Team Iterations ==
=== 2016 - 2018 Training Squad ===
Updated Team Ireland Roller Derby logo

Team Ireland named its team training squad of 30 skaters in November 2016, following try-outs. Head Coach is Karl Case (Lt Damn) from Manchester Roller Derby and Team Ireland Men's Roller Derby, and assistant coach is Jeff Roche from Limerick Roller Derby and Team Ireland Men's Roller Derby Team Manager is Mary Bowe (Bowe T-Vicious) from Waterford City Viqueens.

Number	Name	League
0	Feral Fairy	Manchester Roller Derby
3	Siobhan Murphy	Central City Rollergirls
7	Ellie Beating	Dublin Roller Derby
13	Minx	Manchester Roller Derby
16	Jemerald	Dublin Roller Derby
17	Moa Hogarth	Dublin Roller Derby
19	Holly Sheet	Manchester Roller Derby
23	Emma Greenhalgh	Dublin Roller Derby
24	Celtic Tiger	Oxford Roller Derby
29	Zoe Hayes	Newcastle Roller Derby League
31	Fiona McMahon	Limerick Roller Derby
32	Cork Rebel	Gotham Girls Roller Derby
42	Dana Scurry	Rainy City Roller Derby
44	Aine Kelly	Dublin Roller Derby
45	Oonagh O'flaherty	Belfast Roller Derby
74	Sophia McKee	Dublin Roller Derby
75	Barbara Robinson	Belfast Roller Derby
83	Elaine Snowden	Dublin Roller Derby
89	Katie Tokarski	Nottingham Hellfire Harlots
90	Elaine Clarke	Dublin Roller Derby
99	Rollo Tomasi	Birmingham Blitz Dames
114	Elke Dickson	Dublin Roller Derby
123	Maria Canavan	Dublin Roller Derby
333	Gypsy Darling	Limerick Roller Derby
414	Rusty Bullet	Manchester Roller Derby
490	Fiona Carton	Dublin Roller Derby
777	Amy Plant	Dublin Roller Derby
999	Aisling Guider	Limerick Roller Derby
1033	Caroline Brady	Limerick Roller Derby
36	Hester Wu	London Rollergirls

=== 2014 team roster ===
Team Ireland named its roster for the 2014 Blood & Thunder Roller Derby World Cup in October 2014. Team Coach is Sinister Mary Clarence (London Rollergirls, Assistant Coach is Kitty Cadaver (Dublin Roller Derby) and Line up manager is Belle Igerent (Limerick Rollergirls). The team manager is Titstanium (Limerick Rollergirls).

Number	Name	League
0	Feral Fairy	Leeds Roller Dolls
1033	Jewel Suffer	Limerick Roller Girls
1337	Ra-Ra Rasputina	Belfast Roller Derby
14	Anne Prendiville	Dublin Roller Derby
16	Jemerald	Dublin Roller Derby
17	Moa Hogarth	Dublin Roller Derby
23D	Emma Greenhalgh	Dublin Roller Derby
24	Celtic Tiger	Oxford Roller Derby
3	Puscifer	Belfast Roller Derby
32	Cork Rebel	Gotham Girls Roller Derby
42	Agent Dana Scurry	Central City Rollergirls
45	Maul'er Malone	Belfast Roller Derby
451	Lil' Paine	Boston Derby Dames
490	Fiona Carton	Dublin Roller Derby
69	Rachel McAlpin	Gotham Girls Roller Derby
7	Sarah McMillan	Glasgow Roller Derby
74	Stabba	Dublin Roller Derby
77	Roisin McGrath	Belfast Roller Derby
x3	Siobhan Murphy	Central City Rollergirls
LD50	Chemikill Hazard	Glasgow Roller Derby

=== 2011 team roster ===
Original Team Ireland Roller Derby logo

Team Ireland named its initial roster in September 2011, following try-outs. Most of the skaters were from Ireland's two leagues with bouting experience, the Dublin Roller Girls and Cork City Firebirds. (league affiliations listed as of at the time of the announcement)

The Irish team warmed up for the 2011 World Cup with a number of bouts against English leagues, starting with the Sheffield Steel Rollergirls.

At the World Cup, Ireland lost to Team Finland in round 1; then easily beat Roller Derby Brasil in the consolation stage, but lost to Roller Derby Germany to finish tenth.

The team's head coach, Violent Bob, from Dublin Roller Girls, stated afterwards that the team were "probably among the underdogs" at the World Cup, but were "pretty proud of how we got on". He highlighted in particular the team's group stage 64–119 loss to Team England as a competitive performance.

Number	Name	League
	Agony Annt	Dublin Roller Girls
18	B.A Blockus	Dublin Roller Girls
5x5	Bad Faith	London Rollergirls
245	Belle for Leather	Dublin Roller Girls
1000	Canadian Psycho (Note: Canadian Psycho, while not on the initial roster, was a last-minute replacement and did compete.)	Greater Toronto Area Rollergirls
LD50	Chemikill Hazard	Glasgow Roller Girls
R666	Crow Jane	Cork City Firebirds
76	Coco Pox	Glasgow Roller Girls
619	Holly Sheet	Dolly Rockit Rollers
842	Jessica Mooney	Kernow Rollers
<3	Jessica Rammit	Dublin Roller Girls
37	Kitty Cadaver	Dublin Roller Girls
	Lil' Edee	Dublin Roller Girls
	Peppy Nephrine	Dublin Roller Girls
16	Phantom Jemerald	Cork City Firebirds
N17	Roisin Roulette	Birmingham Blitz Dames
24	Rush'n Barron	Cork City Firebirds
27	Sinister Mary Clarence	London Rollergirls
27	Tina Gutt-her and Jamm	Dublin Roller Girls
21	Wile E. Peyote	Rat City Rollergirls
67	Zola Blood	Dublin Roller Girls
