= Helsinki Roller Derby =

Roller derby league

- Metro area: Helsinki
- Country: Finland
- Founded: 2009
- Teams: All-Stars (A team); Bees (B team); C-Kasetti (C team); C-Kasetti Training (Rec)
- Track type: Flat
- Affiliations: WFTDA
- Website: www.helsinkirollerderby.com

Helsinki Roller Derby is a women's flat track roller derby league based in Helsinki in Finland. Founded in 2009, the league currently consists of three travel teams who compete against teams from other leagues. Helsinki Roller Derby is a member of the Women's Flat Track Derby Association (WFTDA).

As of 2010, the league's skaters included Annabel Apocalipstick, Estrogeena Davis, Renée Hellweger and Bananaspit. Eleven of their skaters were selected for Team Finland at the 2011 Roller Derby World Cup.

== WFTDA competition ==
The league was accepted into the Women's Flat Track Derby Association Apprentice program in July 2011, and it became a full member of the WFTDA in September 2012. In September 2011, Helsinki competed in the Battle of the Nordic Light, the first roller derby tournament in Scandinavia.

During 2013, Helsinki played in the first Suomi Cup of roller derby, taking second place in the tournament after losing narrowly to Kallio Rolling Rainbow in the final.

In 2015, Helsinki qualified for the WFTDA Division 1 Playoffs for the first time, traveling to Omaha, Nebraska for the tournament in October, where they finished seventh by defeating Buffalo, New York's Queen City Roller Girls, 274-199.

In 2016, Helsinki returned to Division 1 Playoffs, entering the Madison tournament as the sixth seed, and finishing in sixth place. As the fifth seed at the 2017 Division 1 Playoff in Malmö, Helsinki won their opening game against Charm City Roller Girls 308-144, but then lost their quarterfinal against the host Crime City Rollers 215-170. Helsinki finished their weekend with a consolation bracket victory over Calgary Roller Derby Association, 365-107.

In 2018, Helsinki competed at the WFTDA Playoff in A Coruña, Spain, finishing their weekend in the consolation round with a 208-172 loss to 2×4 Roller Derby.

Helsinki entered the 2019 International WFTDA Playoffs in Winston-Salem, North Carolina as the sixth seed. The 2019 Playoffs took place from September 6-8, 2019 and was hosted by Greensboro Roller Derby. Helsinki's first match was against the Lomme Roller Girls (eleventh seed) and Helsinki won with a score of 217-66. Helsinki's second match was against Rainy City Roller Derby (third seed) and Rainy City pulled ahead and won with a score of 145-126. Helsinki moved onto the consolation rounds where it matched against Atlanta Roller Derby where Helsinki pulled another victory with a score of 179-155.

The 2024 WFTDA Regional Championships were held June 7-9 2024 in Malmö, hosted by Crime City Rollers. Helsinki entered as the seventh seed, playing its first match against Stockholm Roller Derby (tenth seed) and losing 168-130. Helsinki moved to the consolation bracket where its next match was against the Tiger Bay Brawlers and Helsinki lost 184-125.

=== Rankings ===
Season	Final ranking	Playoffs	Championship
2013	121 WFTDA	N/A	N/A
2014	57 WFTDA	N/A	N/A
2015	33 WFTDA	7 D1	DNQ
2016	22 WFTDA	6 D1	DNQ
2017	14 WFTDA	CR D1	DNQ
2018	18 WFTDA	CR	DNQ
2019	12 WFTDA	CR	DNQ
2023	7 Europe	NPS	NPS
2024	8 Europe	CR	DNQ

- CR = consolation round
- no rankings 2020-2022 due to COVID-19 pandemic
- NPS = no postseason due to COVID-19 pandemic
