= Team Spain (roller derby) =

National sports team

- Founded: 2013
- Colors: Red, yellow
- Head coach: Smärta Dolores; Lobo cop
- Manager: Daisy Dioxin
- Website: teamspainrollerderby.wordpress.com

Team Spain Roller Derby or the Spanish Roller Derby National Team represents Spain in international roller derby competitions such as the Roller Derby World Cup. It was created in 2013 with the goal of competing at the 2014 Roller Derby World Cup, which it did, December 4 to 7 in Dallas, Texas.

== History ==
Team Spain was created in June 2013, through the initiative of the skaters themselves, who desired to create a national team to compete internationally with Spain's first-ever national roller derby squad. The project began with the creation of a work group who selected Daisy Dioxin and Ref Judge Fred as Bench Staff. Shortly after, a first round of tryouts was held in December 16 to 18, 2013 in Madrid, Tenerife and Barcelona, which was attended by a total of 52 skaters. Additionally, video applications were submitted. A total of 35 skaters were selected to comprise the initial squad.

== Roster ==
This initial roster comprised 11 skaters from Barcelona Roller Derby, 10 from Tenerife Roller Derby, two from Black Thunders Derby Dames (Madrid), two from London Rollergirls, as well as one each from Alcoy Roller Derby, Dutchland Rollers, Garden State Rollergirls, Lisboa Roller Derby Troopers, Manchester Roller Derby, Rayo Dockers Valencia, Roller Derby Cáceres, Roller Derby Madrid, Toronto Roller Derby and Zaragoza Roller Derby.

=== 2018 Roller Derby World Cup roster ===
The following skaters were on the final roster for the 2018 Roller Derby World Cup in Manchester, England:

Number	Name	League	
0	Syntaxe Error	SAM Roller Derby	
011	Darth Eider	Barcelona Roller Derby	
10	Caperu	Barcelona Roller Derby	
111	Esther Arocha	London Roller Derby	
15	Furia Poligonera	Roller Derby Madrid	
20	Mattie	Rainy City Roller Derby	
22	Sherry Bomb	Tenerife Roller Derby	
247	Mia Palau	Rose City Rollers	
3	Bee'Cha	Oslo Roller Derby	
301	MiniRoss	London Roller Derby	
314	Stacy Malibú	Barcelona Roller Derby	
333	Clara Despistes	Roller Derby Madrid	
50	Snow Black	Brussels Derby Pixies	
517	Iron D. Doll	Roller Derby Cáceres	
52	Bambi Killer	Roller Derby Madrid	Captain
63	Perra Peligro	Rainy City Roller Derby	
718	Allie Ollie	Roller Derby Madrid	
78	Hija de Odín	Roller Derby Cáceres	Captain
86	Hawaii	Roller Derby Madrid	
877	Mari Quita	Roller Derby Madrid	

In 2018, bench staff for Spain were La Justicia (Bench Coach), Lola Vulkano (Lineup Manager) and Elle Visse (Mirror Bench Coach).

=== 2014 World Cup roster ===
The team were coached by Daisy Dioxin of London Rollergirls and Smarta of Crime City Rollers.

The following skaters were on the final roster for the 2014 Roller Derby World Cup in Dallas, Texas:

Number	Name	League	
4	Angry Kris	Tenerife Roller Derby	
52	Bambi Killer	Black Thunders Derby Dames	
72	Cookie Monster	Tenerife Roller Derby	
8	Dadá	Tenerife Roller Derby	
111	Esther Arocha (Lady Go-Go)	London Rollergirls	Captain
0	Gata Cegata	Barcelona Roller Derby	
78	Hija de Odín	RD Cáceres – Destroyer Dolls	
911	Jackie The Ripper	Tenerife Roller Derby	
11	Juan Sin Miedo	Tenerife Roller Derby	
12	Mercromina	Tenerife Roller Derby	
83	La Mano	Barcelona Roller Derby	
19	Lola Vulkano	London Rollergirls	
23	Maggie Love	Barcelona Roller Derby	
25	Malicia	Tenerife Roller Derby	
301	MiniRoss	Tenerife Roller Derby	
17	Pólvora	Barcelona Roller Derby	
10	Angry Beaver	Garden State Rollergirls	
22	Sherry Bomb	Tenerife Roller Derby	
314	Stacy Malibú	Barcelona Roller Derby	
77	Teremoto	Crime City Rollers	
247	Violent Femme	Barcelona Roller Derby	Vice-Captain

The following skaters made the initial training roster, but not the final roster which went to Dallas:

Number	Name	League
39	Ave Fénix	Barcelona Roller Derby
7D9	Artrosix	Black Thunders Derby Dames
93	Bad Milk	Barcelona Roller Derby
10	Bam-Bam	Tenerife Roller Derby
10	Caperucita Terror	Barcelona Roller Derby
3	Crispeta	Barcelona Roller Derby
77	Dale Caña	Barcelona Roller Derby
5	Duendenator	Manchester Roller Derby
33	Lethal Kath	Roller Derby Madrid
13	Mala Yerba	Alcoy Roller Derby
12	Killer Queen	Rayo Dockers Valencia
78	Momotombo	Lisboa Roller Derby Troopers
23	Maggie Love	Barcelona Roller Derby
1331	Monster-Rat	Barcelona Roller Derby
1285	Slamureye	Toronto Roller Derby
1834	The Spanish Incollision	Dutchland Rollers
6	6shei6	Zaragoza Roller Derby
