= Ruhrpott Roller Derby =

Roller derby league

- Metro area: Essen
- Country: Germany
- Founded: 2009
- Teams: Devil Dolls (A team); Devil's Rejects (B team)
- Track type: Flat
- Venue: Arena Raumerstraße; Eishalle Essen-West
- Affiliations: WFTDA
- Website: www.ruhrpottrollerderby.de

Ruhrpott Roller Derby (RPRD) is a women's flat track roller derby league based in Essen, Germany. Founded in 2009, the league consists of two teams, which compete against teams from other leagues. Ruhrpott is a member of the Women's Flat Track Derby Association (WFTDA).

== History ==
The league was founded in the summer of 2009, as Devil Dolls Essen. It played its first bout the following summer, against Barockcity Rollerderby, and competed in the first German Roller Derby Championship in December 2010, taking third place behind the Stuttgart Valley Rollergirlz and Bear City Roller Derby.

The league changed its name from Devil Dolls Essen to Ruhrpott Roller Girls, then later to Ruhrpott Roller Derby.

Ruhrpott Roller Girls logo

Three Ruhrpott skaters were selected to play for Roller Derby Germany at the 2011 Roller Derby World Cup.

In April 2013, Ruhrpott was accepted as a member of the Women's Flat Track Derby Association Apprentice Program, and became a full WFTDA member league in October 2014.

== WFTDA rankings ==
Season	Final ranking	Playoffs	Championship
2016	286 WFTDA	DNQ	DNQ
2017	319 WFTDA	DNQ	DNQ
2018	246 WFTDA	DNQ	DNQ
2019	233 WFTDA	DNQ	DNQ
2023	45 Europe	DNQ	DNQ
2024	54 Europe	DNQ	DNQ
