= Nottingham Roller Derby =

Roller derby league

- Metro area: Nottingham
- Country: United Kingdom
- Founded: 2013
- Teams: Nottingham Roller Derby Arrows (A), Nottingham Roller Derby Bolts (B)
- Track type: Flat
- Venue: Nottingham Trent University
- Affiliations: UKRDA
- Website: http://nottsrollerderby.co.uk

Nottingham Roller Derby is a flat track roller derby league based in Nottingham, England. Founded in 2013, from a merger of two local leagues, it was the first league in the UK to host a co-ed roller derby competition.

== League Structure ==
The league is made up of two teams:

- Nottingham Roller Derby Arrows (A, established 2010)
- Nottingham Roller Derby Bolts (B, established 2015)

The following teams were previously part of the league, but have since either become defunct or established their own organisations:

- Super Smash Brollers (A, men's team, established 2012) became part of the then-named Nottingham Roller Girls in 2013, and have since struck out on their own as East Midlands Open Roller Derby.
- Nottingham Roller Derby Co-Ed (established 2011)

== League History ==
Nottingham Roller Girls (NRG) was formed in 2013, merging established local women's and men's teams Nottingham Roller Girls and Super Smash Brollers. They underwent a rebrand in 2020 to become Nottingham Roller Derby. At the same time, the Super Smash Brollers set up on their own as East Midlands Open Roller Derby, a Men's Roller Derby Association-aligned league.

The league were members of the United Kingdom Roller Derby Association from 2015–2017.

Since 2015, the league has hosted the annual eponymous "Louisey Rider Cup" competition, in honour of their teammate Louise Wright (derby name Louisey Rider) who was killed in a road traffic collision while cycling in 2014. The event has made over £13,000 for road safety charity Brake. In 2020, the event went virtual due to the COVID-19 pandemic and returned as a slimmed-down, non-skating, celebration event outdoors in 2021. 2022 saw the tournament return as a closed-door event, and in 2023 the event returned in full, welcoming back spectators.

In 2022, the league welcomed local journalist Lizzy O'Riordan of LeftLion to a practice session to try out the sport and spread awareness.

== Five Nations Roller Derby Championships ==
The league participated in the British Roller Derby Championships 2015, in the Women T3 West tier. In their first game they narrowly beat the Dolly Rockit Rollers 162-161, but lost their other four games against Swansea City Roller Derby, Belfast Roller Derby, Hereford Roller Derby and Birmingham Blitz Dames. This caused them to place second-to-last, just above the Dolly Rokckits.

The following year they were placed into the Women Tier 4 West, where they faced the Dolly Rockit Rollers again, as well as Mansfield Roller Derby and Evolution Roller Derby and winning all of their games.

After a tournament restructure, they found themselves in the Women's T3 Regional tier in 2017. First they played Sheffield Steel Roller Derby and lost 183–147. Their next opponents were Milton Keynes Roller Derby who they beat comfortably, 240–65. Nottingham then lost their other two games: 146-133 against Hallam Hellcats Roller Derby, then 111–116 to the Dolly Rockit Rollers.

They remained in the Women's T3 Regional tier for 2018, losing their first game to Wiltshire Roller Derby, 110–190. They fared no better against Hull's Angel's Roller Derby though the margin of loss was smaller, 159–157. They went on to beat Granite City Roller Derby, 362-80, and Mansfield Roller Derby 287–223. This winning streak continued with victories against Lincolnshire Bombers Roller Derby, 295–125; Roller Derby Leicester, 325–55; and their rematch against Hull's Angels, 342–85.

In 2019, after a further tournament restructure, the league found themselves in the Women's T2 National tier. They opened with a narrow win against Dorset Roller Derby, 181-180, but then lost to North Wales Roller Derby, 214–153. They won their next three games against Hallam Hellcats Roller Derby, 173–155; Nottingham Hellfire Harlots B team, 195–119; and Leeds Roller Derby B team, 209–128. Their final game of the championship was a close one against Mansfield Roller Derby, ending in a loss for Nottingham, 223–231.

The league were due to compete in the British Roller Derby Championships 2020, finding themselves in the Women's T1 Premier tier, however the competition was interrupted by the COVID-19 pandemic, and they completed only one game. This was on 1 February 2020, against Rainy City Revolution, which Nottingham won 226–150.

In 2021, the British Championships rebranded as the Five Nations Roller Derby Championships.
