= Halifax Bruising Banditas =

Roller derby league

- Metro area: Calderdale, Kirklees
- Country: United Kingdom
- Founded: 2011
- Teams: Halifax Bruising Banditas (A)
- Track type: Flat
- Venue: Calderdale College
- Website: halifaxbruisingbanditas.com

Halifax Bruising Banditas (HBB) are a flat track roller derby league based in Halifax, West Yorkshire, England. Established in 2011, they are the first roller derby league in the Calderdale and Kirklees area. They play to the ruleset of the Women's Flat Track Derby Association (WFTDA), and have been members of the United Kingdom Roller Derby Association (UKRDA) since 2013.

== League History ==
The Halifax Bruising Banditas was founded in June 2011, led by Lauren Artington who had been skating with another league for two-and-a-half years. She brought together others who had begun to skate with Hot Wheel Roller Derby and Leeds Roller Dolls and aimed to spread the sport to the wider West Yorkshire area. The league was originally called Bruising Banditas, but was changed to Halifax Bruising Banditas in 2012 to draw a link to its home town.

The league was accepted into the UKRDA in October 2013 and debuted in the rankings in Q2 2015.

They are keen participants in local community events, and took part in the 50th Brighouse Charity Gala in 2015.

== League Structure ==
The Banditas have one travel team, the Halifax Bruising Banditas, who play against teams from around the country.

The league is run by its members which include non-skaters. All aspects of league organisation are run on a voluntary basis including coaching, promotion, recruitment, fundraising and game organisation. The league is led by the Board which is voted in annually as well as the Captain and Vice-Captain roles.

The team practises twice a week at Calderdale College. In the past the league has trained at venues around both Halifax and Huddersfield.

== Seasons ==
=== 2012 ===
HBB's first open bout was against the Hulls Angels Roller Dames on 13 May 2012 which resulted in a win for Halifax. Throughout the year they played a total of 3 games with a total of 2 wins and 1 loss.

=== 2013 ===
In 2013 HBB played a total of 5 games and competed in 2 tournaments, Great Yorkshire Showdown 2013 and Hassle in Newcastle 2013. The normal season concluded with 4 wins and 1 loss. HBB finished second in their group at both the Great Yorkshire Showdown and Hassle in Newcastle competitions.

=== 2014 ===
There were 6 games for HBB in 2014 as well as 2 tournaments. In normal play the Banditas finished the season with 4 wins to 2 losses. They competed in the Great Yorkshire Showdown 2014 finishing second in their group and won the inaugural Humberstruck tournament

=== 2015 ===
Halifax Bruising Banditas played in and hosted the first ever game of the British Roller Derby Championships. HBB competed in the Tier 3 North table finishing bottom of after 5 losses in 5 games. They finished the season with a win in a non-championship game against Spa Town Roller Girls.

=== 2016 ===
HBB finished second in the Tier 4 North table with two wins and two losses. They beat Blackpool Roller Derby and Durham Roller Derby and lost to eventual first-place finishers Granite City Roller Derby and third-place finishers Spa Town Roller Derby. They were promoted to Tier 3 along with Granite City and Spa Town Roller Derby for the 2017 competition.
