= Riot City Ravens =

Roller derby league

- Metro area: Newport, Wales
- Country: Wales
- Founded: 2014
- Venue: Bettws Active Living Centre
- Website: riotcityravens.blogspot.co.uk

Riot City Ravens (RCR) is a roller derby league based in Newport, Wales. The league was founded in 2014 and trains twice a week, members regularly scrimmage with other leagues in South Wales.

The league entered into the 2015 British Roller Derby Championships.
