= Team Finland (roller derby) =

National sports team

- Founded: 2011
- Colors: Blue and white
- Head coach: Estrogreena Davis (head); Tigre Force (assistant)
- Manager: Claire Leah Threat
- Championships: 5th place at 2011 Roller Derby World Cup
- Broadcasters: Derby News Network
- Website: www.rollerderbyfinland.com

Team Finland represents Finland in women's international roller derby, in events such as the Roller Derby World Cup. The team was first formed to compete at the 2011 Roller Derby World Cup, and finished the tournament in fifth place.

Finland's first bout was on 8 October 2011, against Team Sweden in Helsinki, in what Stockholm Roller Derby claimed was "the world's first Roller Derby bout between two nations". Finland lost by 135 points to 71.

At the World Cup, Finland lost their quarter final to Team Canada by 499 points to 31, at that time the highest point spread in the tournament. They then beat France and Sweden in the consolation stage, to finish in fifth place.

== Team roster ==
=== 2011 team roster ===
The team announced its roster for the 2011 Roller Derby World Cup in August 2011. (league affiliations listed as of at the time of the announcement)

Number	Name	League
85	Bloody-HO-Mary	Tampere Rollin' Hos
404	Doris	Helsinki Roller Derby
2997	Estrogeena Davis	Helsinki Roller Derby
22	Juicy Butther	Dirty River Roller Grrrls
886	KC Knucklebone	Helsinki Roller Derby
10	Kata Strofi	Helsinki Roller Derby
95	Kati Kyyrö	Helsinki Roller Derby
121	Liisa Saari	Helsinki Roller Derby
96	Lizz Troublegum	Helsinki Roller Derby
09	Misty Muffdivah	Crime City Rollers
6	Page Disaster	Helsinki Roller Derby
99	Suvi Hokkari	Helsinki Roller Derby
142	Tigre Force	Helsinki Roller Derby
94	Trixie GrandBang	Helsinki Roller Derby
1	Misbitch	Kallio Rolling Rainbow
8	Pink Spanker	Kallio Rolling Rainbow
54	The Blizzard	Bristol Roller Derby
3	Udre	Kallio Rolling Rainbow

=== 2011 coaching staff ===
- Claire Leah Threat (manager)
- Estrogreena Davis (head coach)
- Tigre Force (assistant coach)
