= Dundee Roller Derby =

Roller derby league

- Metro area: Dundee
- Country: United Kingdom
- Founded: 2011
- Teams: Silvery Tayzers (A team); Bonnie Colliders (B team); Jutes of Hazzard; Press Gangsters; Jammin' Dodgers
- Track type: Flat
- Venue: Dundee International Sports Centre (DISC)
- Affiliations: WFTDA
- Website: https://dundeerollerderby.wixsite.com/thedrd

Dundee Roller Derby (DRD) is a flat track roller derby league based in Dundee, Scotland. There are two travel teams, the Silvery Tayzers (A), and the Bonnie Colliders (B), as well as three home teams who play in intraleague competitions: Jutes of Hazzard, Press Gangsters and Jammin' Dodgers.

Dundee Roller Derby is a member of the Women's Flat Track Derby Association (WFTDA) and has had several members play for Team Scotland Roller Derby.

== Teams ==
=== Travel teams ===
- Silvery Tayzers (A)
- Bonnie Colliders (B)

=== Home teams ===
Inspired by the Dundonian heritage of "jam, jute, and journalism", there are three home teams:

- Jutes of Hazzard
- Press Gangsters
- Jammin' Dodgers

== League history ==
Initially skating as the Dundee Destroyers from March 2007, the league became the Dundee Roller Girls in early 2011, and finally transitioned to Dundee Roller Derby in 2018. DRD was the fourth Scottish roller derby league, after Glasgow Roller Derby, Auld Reekie Roller Derby and Granite City Roller Derby.

The league has some items in the archives of the National Museum of Roller Derby, a project by a previous Glasgow Roller Derby skater to collate roller derby memorabilia.

Dundee Roller Derby joined UKRDA in 2013. During 2016, they were a WFTDA Apprentice League, graduating to full membership in March 2017.

The league has some outstanding achievements, and several players have made it to their national teams. In 2011, some members of DRD made it as far as the 2011 Roller Derby World Cup training squad for Team Scotland Roller Derby but ultimately didn't make the roster.

Plans were discussed in 2016 for an outdoor skating track in Baxter Park, of which Dundee Roller Derby were supportive. As yet, this has not come to fruition though there is a community group campaigning for it to become reality.

== WFTDA competition ==
=== Rankings ===
Season	Final ranking	Playoffs	Championship
2017	212 WFTDA	DNQ	DNQ
2018	260 WFTDA	DNQ	DNQ
2019	198 WFTDA	DNQ	DNQ
2020	183 WFTDA	DNQ	DNQ

*Please note that rankings were suspended in March 2020 in light of the pandemic.

== In the media ==
Dundee Roller Derby have been featured on STV News in a piece on their preparations for a game, and the appeal and challenges of roller derby.
