= Team Scotland Roller Derby =

- Founded: 2011
- Colors: Blue, white and black
- Head coach: Viper (2011), Ella Bella Bang Bang (2014), Clinically Wasted (2014)
- Manager: Jill Antonic (2014)
- Championships: 11th place at 2011 Roller Derby World Cup, 12th place at 2018 Roller Derby World Cup
- Broadcasters: Derby News Network

Team Scotland Roller Derby represents Scotland in women's international roller derby, in events such as the Roller Derby World Cup. The team was first formed to compete at the 2011 Roller Derby World Cup, and finished the tournament in eleventh place.

Team Scotland played two warm-up matches for the World Cup, beating both a "rest of Scotland" team, and the "Northern All-Stars", consisting of skaters from the north of England.

At the World Cup, Scotland lost narrowly to New Zealand, 124 to 111, and overwhelmingly to Team USA, 435 to 1. Although this led to them becoming the lowest-ranked team in the consolation stage, they beat Team Argentina and later beat Team Brazil, to finish eleventh out of thirteen teams.

== Team roster ==
=== 2011 team roster ===
About 45 skaters tried out for the initial team. The roster was announced in August. (league affiliations listed as of at the time of the announcement)

Number	Name	League
42	Alma Geddon	Auld Reekie Roller Girls
01	Armed Bandit	SoCal Derby
999	Betty Gogo	Glasgow Roller Girls
28	Blazin Phoenix	Auld Reekie Roller Girls
3	Ciderella	Auld Reekie Roller Girls
111	Clinically Wasted	Granite City Roller Girls
77	Crazylegs	Auld Reekie Roller Girls
55	Danger Mouth	Auld Reekie Roller Girls
182	Fight Cub	Granite City Roller Girls
5	Lily Lethal	Glasgow Roller Girls
13	Marla Mayhem	Glasgow Roller Girls
f104	Marshall Lawless	Glasgow Roller Girls
7	Minnie Riot	Auld Reekie Roller Girls
99	Mistress Malicious	Glasgow Roller Girls
66	Mo Be Quick	Auld Reekie Roller Girls
23	Moxie Emerald	Auld Reekie Roller Girls
16	Velosidy	Auld Reekie Roller Girls
29	Viper	Glasgow Roller Girls
11	Whiskey Galore	Glasgow Roller Girls
360	Wild Oates	Glasgow Roller Girls

=== 2014 team roster ===
The 2014 team was selected from a "Training Team" of 30 skaters, themselves selected via two rounds of tryouts performed under the auspices of the UK Roller Derby Association (UKRDA). The final 20 skaters selected for the 2014 World Cup roster were announced on 1 May 2014.

Since that announcement, Team Scotland have appeared in two public bouts, where many of the skaters skated under their legal names, rather than derby names (Team Scotland skaters choose themselves whether to use their legal or skate names for this squad): the below table lists skaters by the names they skate under with their home leagues. (league affiliations listed as of at the time of the announcement)

Number	Name	League
1111	Admiral Attackbar	Auld Reekie Roller Girls
87	Caitlin O'Carroll	Auld Reekie Roller Girls
3	Ciderella	Auld Reekie Roller Girls
111	Clinically Wasted	Granite City Roller Girls
11	Crazylegs	Auld Reekie Roller Girls
182	Fight Cub	Granite City Roller Girls
31	Jess E. Ska	Glasgow Roller Derby
42	Marshall Lawless	Glasgow Roller Derby
69	Milky	Dundee Roller Girls
7	Minnie Riot	Auld Reekie Roller Girls
22	Mona Rampage	Glasgow Roller Derby
09	Rock'N Riot	Granite City Roller Girls
210	Rogue Runner	Glasgow Roller Derby
0131	Sarah Oates	London Rollergirls
85	Skinner Alive	Auld Reekie Roller Girls
0	Splat	Glasgow Roller Derby
28	Suffra Jet	Glasgow Roller Derby
931	The Bexorcist	Seaside Siren Roller Girls
16	Velocidy	Auld Reekie Roller Girls
39	Yin & Bang	Auld Reekie Roller Girls
5	Ginge	Auld Reekie Roller Girls

=== 2018 team roster ===
The 2018 roster was announced on 2 March 2017, selected from amongst the training team of 30. There was a more even spread of talent from across Scotland and the UK this time around, and the team played their first public game against Team Ireland Roller Derby as part of the Euroclash 2017 tournament, hosted by Newcastle Roller Derby. They achieved their best result in a world cup yet at the 2018 Roller Derby World Cup, coming in 12th place.

Number	Name	League
11	Crazylegs	Auld Reekie Roller Derby
99	Not Sorry Laurie	Roller Derby Leicester
764	Tids	Wirral Roller Derby
750	Irn Brute	London Rockin' Rollers
77	Sharlotte Patterson	Auld Reekie Roller Derby
7	Jess Little	Auld Reekie Roller Derby
07	Laura Liston	Dundee Roller Derby
50	Rosie Peacock	Auld Reekie Roller Derby
350	Devil's Advoskate	Glasgow Roller Derby
792	Malin Landsborough	Dundee Roller Derby
64	Claire Semple	Dundee Roller Derby
09	Rock'n Riot	Granite City Roller Derby
3	Anita B Nasty	Newcastle Roller Derby
22	Mona Rampage	Glasgow Roller Derby
87	McCartney	Independent
39	Yin & Bang (Bangers)	Auld Reekie Roller Derby
507	Phoenix Fatale	Glasgow Roller Derby
03	Shorty McLightningpants	Glasgow Roller Derby
102	Ellin Seaton	Dundee Roller Derby
407	Jo Mamma	Granite City Roller Derby
