= Namur Roller Derby =

Roller derby league

- Metro area: Namur
- Country: Belgium
- Founded: 2011
- Teams: Namur Roller Derby A Namur Roller Derby B Namur Roller Derby C Namur Glorious Basterds (Mixed team)
- Track type: Flat
- Venue: Centre Sportif de Plomcot
- Affiliations: WFTDA
- Website: www.namurrollerderby.be

Namur Roller Derby (NRD), formerly known as Namur Roller Girls, is a flat track roller derby league based in Namur, Belgium. Founded in 2011, the league currently consists of three Finta* teams and one mixed team which compete against teams from other leagues. Namur Roller Derby is a member of the Women's Flat Track Derby Association (WFTDA).

== History ==
The league was founded in March 2011 by five friends. At first with the help of trainers from the Brussels Derby Pixies, the skaters learned the basics of roller derby before becoming gradually autonomous. The Namur Roller Derby A team played its first bout against the Dom City Dolls from Utrecht in September 2012.

In January 2014, Namur Roller Derby was accepted as member of the WFTDA Apprentice Program. Later that year, a second team, the Namur Roller Derby B, was founded. The league also launched a mixed team that year, the Namur Glorious Basterds.

In the beginning of 2016, a third Finta* team was established, the Namur Roller Derby C.

Namur Roller Derby graduated to full WFTDA membership in March 2017.

In March 2022, the league, previously known as Namur Roller Girls, renamed itself to Namur Roller Derby.
