= Stockholm Roller Derby =

Roller derby league

- Metro area: Stockholm
- Country: Sweden
- Founded: 2007
- Teams: All Stars (A team); Bstrds (B team); C-Stars (C team); YoungSTRDs (junior team)
- Track type: Flat
- Affiliations: WFTDA
- Website: rollerderby.se

Stockholm Roller Derby (STRD) is a women's flat track roller derby league based in Stockholm, Sweden. Founded in 2007, the league currently consists of four teams which compete against teams from other leagues and the league also has their own group of officials.

Stockholm Allstars consists of STRD’s WFTDA 20 charter. Stockholm BSTRDs compete in the top tier of Swedish national play, Elitserien. Stockholm C-Stars play in Division 2 of Swedish national play. YoungSTRDs find themselves in matches against other junior teams. Stockholm Roller Derby is a member of the Women's Flat Track Derby Association (WFTDA).

== History ==
The first roller derby league in Sweden, Stockholm Roller Derby was founded by Nattis Mörkenstam, Linn Hultström, Jenny Stendahl, Emmelie Bogårdh and Michel Diaz Nocetti and initially practised in a garage. They struggled to find a permanent practice venue, and initially recruited only slowly. However, the league received a major boost when the film Whip It! was released, and found training space in an abandoned shopping mall. By mid-2010, the league had forty skaters, while three other leagues had emerged in the country, including the Crime City Rollers.

Stockholm played their first bout in October 2010, against Helsinki Roller Derby, and took part in the first all-Swedish bout in March 2011, against Crime City. The league also participated in the first Scandinavian tournament, "Battle of the Nordic Light", losing to Helsinki but beating Copenhagen.

In October 2011, Stockholm became an apprentice member of the Women's Flat Track Derby Association, and it graduated to full membership in December 2012. Seven of Stockholm's skaters were selected to play for Team Sweden at the 2011 Roller Derby World Cup.

Stockholm also has a group of cheerleaders named the "Beerleaders" who are a group of fans that cheer on Stockholm's team and officials.

== WFTDA competition ==
At the first European WFTDA tournament in November 2012, "Track Queens Battle Royal", Stockholm came at third place out of ten teams, defending their ingoing ranking for the tournament.

Stockholm first qualified for the international WFTDA Division 1 Playoffs in 2015, entering the Dallas tournament as the fifth seed, and finishing in seventh place.

In 2016, Stockholm returned to Division 1 Playoffs, entering the Vancouver tournament as the eighth seed and again finishing in seventh place.

At the 2017 Malmo Division 1 Playoff, Stockholm won their opening game against Terminal City Rollergirls 197-145, but then lost their quarterfinal against Denver Roller Derby, 330-152. Stockholm finished the weekend with a 184-166 consolation bracket victory over Kallio Rolling Rainbow.

In 2018, Stockholm qualified for the WFTDA Playoff in A Coruña, Spain, finishing out of the medals with a consolation round loss to 2×4 Roller Derby, 208-172.

The 2019 International WFTDA Playoffs were hosted by Rat City Roller Derby in Seattle from 13-15 September 2019. Stockholm entered as the ninth seed and lost its first round against Arizona Roller Derby with a score of 197-95. Stockholm was then moved to the consolation bracket where it played Queen City Roller Derby (eleventh seed) and lost 224-176.

In 2024, Crime City Rollers hosted the first European postseason event since the COVID-19 pandemic. The WFTDA Regional Championships took place in Malmö, Sweden from 7-9 June 2024. Stockholm entered as the tenth seed and won its first round with a score of 168-130 against Helsinki Roller Derby. Stockholm lost its second game of the tournament against the second seed team, Crime City Rollers 186-109, moving Stockholm to consolation rounds. Stockholm's consolation round against Antwerp Roller Derby was lost by a single point (150-149).

=== Rankings ===
Season	Final ranking	Playoffs	Championship
2013	116 WFTDA	N/A	N/A
2014	41 WFTDA	N/A	N/A
2015	17 WFTDA	7 D1	DNQ
2016	28 WFTDA	7 D1	DNQ
2017	20 WFTDA	CR D1	DNQ
2018	21 WFTDA	CR	DNQ
2019	27 WFTDA	CR	DNQ
2023	9 Europe	NPS	NPS
2024	12 Europe	CR	DNQ

- CR = consolation round
- no rankings 2020-2022 due to COVID-19 pandemic
- NPS = no postseason 2020-2023 due to COVID-19 pandemic
