= Team Sweden (roller derby) =

National sports team

- Founded: 2011
- Colors: Blue and yellow
- Head coach: Swede Hurt
- Manager: Fluke Skywalker
- Website: www.teamswedenrollerderby.com

Team Sweden represents Sweden in women's international roller derby. The team was first formed to compete at the 2011 Roller Derby World Cup, and finished the tournament in sixth place.

Sweden's first bout was on 8 October 2011, against Team Finland in Helsinki, in what Stockholm Roller Derby claimed was "the world's first Roller Derby bout between two nations". Sweden won by 135 points to 71. One of the team's skaters predicted that Sweden would finish in the top five at the World Cup.

At the World Cup, Sweden lost their quarter final to Australia by 126 points to 80, then beat New Zealand and lost to Finland in the consolations stage, to finish in sixth place.

== Team roster ==
=== 2011 team roster ===
During the first tryout for the team, three skaters suffered fractures. Nineteen of the team's initial twenty-skater roster came from Women's Flat Track Derby Association-affiliated leagues, the large majority from the Crime City Rollers and Stockholm Roller Derby. The list below is the roster used for Team Sweden's appearance at the 2011 Roller Derby World Cup, with the skaters' league affiliations being those as of at the time of the announcement:

Number	Name	League
	Alotta Riot	Crime City Rollers
	Ankefar	Crime City Rollers
	Barbara Barfight	Crime City Rollers
	Becky Lawless	Stockholm Roller Derby
	Bess I'rv Cold	Stockholm Roller Derby
	Fenix Fortsomfan	Crime City Rollers
	Firebird Steele	Crime City Rollers
	Fisty	Crime City Rollers
	HussInsane	Stockholm Roller Derby
	HyperNova	Stockholm Roller Derby
	Jazz Ass	Stockholm Roller Derby
	Jo Evil Eye	Crime City Rollers
	Kit Kat Power	London Rockin' Rollers
	Kix deVille	Stockholm Roller Derby
	Knickerblocker Glory	London Rollergirls
	Mad Maloony	Crime City Rollers
	Ninja	Crime City Rollers
	Swede Hurt	Crime City Rollers
	Twist'd T	Stockholm Roller Derby
	Vix Viking	Crime City Rollers

== Coaching staff ==
- Swede Hurt
- Mad Maloony
- Sloppy Boggins
- Fluke Skywalker
