= St. Pauli Roller Derby =

Roller derby league

- Metro area: Hamburg
- Country: Germany
- Founded: 2008
- Teams: St. Pauli A St. Pauli B St. Pauli United Team Roster
- Track type: Flat
- Venue: Sporthalle Wirtschaftsgymnasium, Christianeum Othmarschen
- Website: www.stpaulirollerderby.de

St. Pauli Roller Derby is a flat track roller derby league based in Hamburg in Germany. It consists of two trip teams, an A team and a B team, which compete against teams from other leagues. They are called St. Pauli A and St. Pauli B respectively.

St. Pauli Roller Derby is the follow-up club to the Harbor Girls e.V., which was an independent roller derby club before it became part of FC St. Pauli and changed its name.

== History ==
The Harbor Girls were founded by Spooky Spiky and Killing Zoe, the former had previously skated with the Stuttgart Valley Rollergirlz. By mid-2011, the league had thirty skaters.

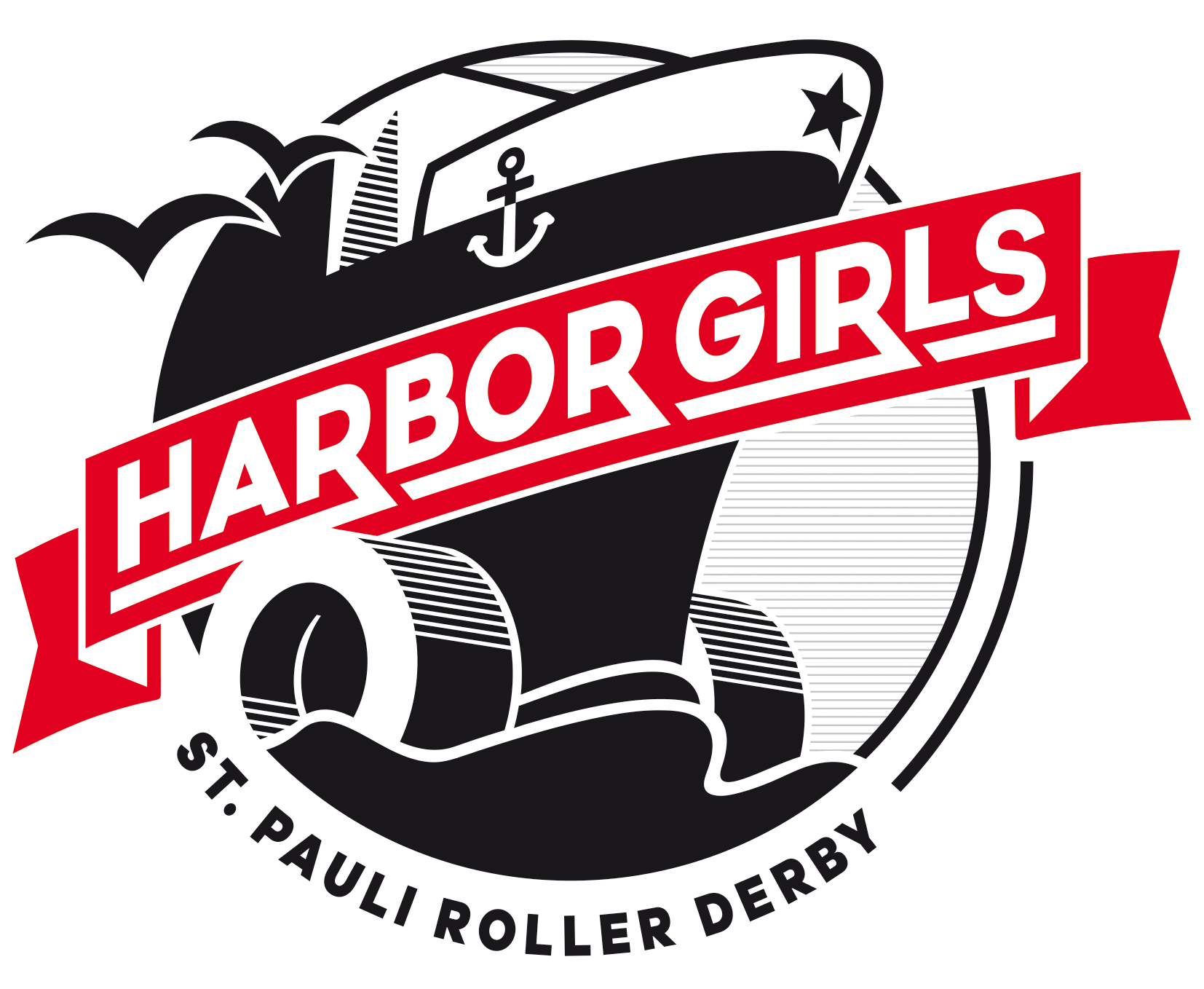
Logo of the "Harbour Girls" before the 2023 name change

St. Pauli was accepted by the Women's Flat Track Derby Association in 2016 as a member league, marking the league eligible for international ranking.

In March 2023, the league announced a changed name to St. Pauli Roller Derby on their Facebook profile. This change was made to reflect the expansive genders within the league, and to honor their history with FC St. Pauli. The logo was updated with this change.

== Competition ==
"Heavy Miss Gale", a skater from the league, was selected for the German national team for the 2011 Roller Derby World Cup.

In the 2014 World Championship, four player from SPRD were selected to play in the Dallas roster: Ostblocker, Jeanne Dark, Knock 'n' Rose and Lotta Loveless.

In 2024, St. Pauli came in first place in the German national competition, Bundesliga. The win came after taking second place in both 2016 and 2018 and third place in 2023.

=== WFTDA rankings ===
Season	Final ranking	Playoffs	Championship
2017	237 WFTDA	DNQ	DNQ
2018	255 WFTDA	DNQ	DNQ
2019	331 WFTDA	DNQ	DNQ
2023	62 Europe	NPS	NPS
2024	35 Europe	DNQ	DNQ

- no rankings 2020-2022 due to COVID-19 pandemic
- NPS = no postseason
