= Dublin Roller Derby =

Roller derby league

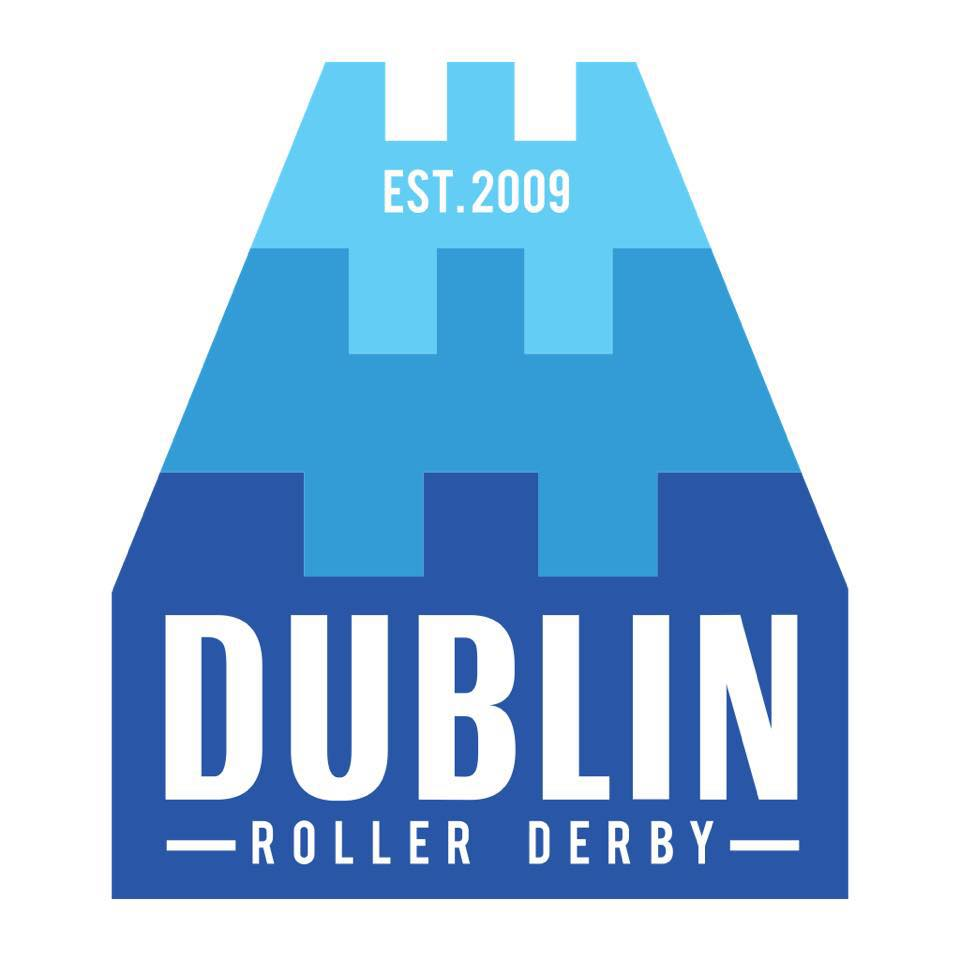
- Metro area: Dublin
- Country: Ireland
- Founded: 2009
- Teams: Dublin Roller Derby A (A team); Dublin Roller Derby B (B team); Dublin Roller Derby C (C team); Eoin McShoves; Fuppin’ Baxtards; Whack Hacketts
- Track type: Flat
- Venue: National Basketball Arena, Tallaght
- Affiliations: WFTDA
- Website: http://www.dublinrollerderby.com

Dublin Roller Derby (DRD) is a women's flat track roller derby league based in Dublin, Ireland. Founded in 2009, Dublin Roller Derby is a member of the Women's Flat Track Derby Association (WFTDA).

== History ==
The Dublin Roller Girls were the first roller derby league to form in Ireland. Their intra-league bout in June 2011 was the first public roller derby in the country. In their first bouting season, the Dublin Roller Girls played seven bouts, scoring four wins.

Nine skaters from the league were selected for Team Ireland at the Roller Derby World Cup in 2011, while Dublin also supplied the head coach and the manager for the team.

In early 2012, they moved to the National Basketball Arena in Tallaght. That year, Dublin's A team played ten bouts with seven wins. The B team also started bouting for the first time, playing 5 bouts and winning 3.

Dublin logo pre-2013

Founded in 2009 as Dublin Roller Girls (DRG), on 19 March 2013 the league announced via its Facebook page that they had changed their name to Dublin Roller Derby. In October 2013, Dublin was accepted as a member of the WFTDA Apprentice Programme, and in December 2014, Dublin was accepted as a full member of the Women's Flat Track Derby Association.

In 2017, the league consists of three home teams, and three travel teams that played teams from other leagues.

After the COVID-19 pandemic, the league's travel teams were combined into one team.

== WFTDA competition ==
In 2017 Dublin qualified for WFTDA Division 2 Playoffs for the first time as the 16th seed, and opened the weekend by upsetting top seed Auld Reekie Roller Girls 200-183. Dublin followed up by defeating ninth seed No Coast Derby Girls 166-165 in a tight game, and won another narrow victory over Naptown Roller Derby, 161-158. Dublin then lost their semifinal to Paris Rollergirls 259-152, as well as a rematch with Naptown, 215-144 and finished in fourth place.

In 2018, Dublin qualified for the WFTDA Europe Continental Cup held in Birmingham, England, as the second seed, and finished in second after losing the final to Kallio Rolling Rainbow.

In 2019, Dublin qualified again for the WFTDA Europe Continental Cup held in Helsinki, Finland, as the first seed. Having lost the first match against Antwerp Roller Derby, they ended up in sixth place.

=== Rankings ===
Season	Final ranking	Playoffs	Championship
2015	143 WFTDA	DNQ	DNQ
2016	86 WFTDA	DNQ	DNQ
2017	53 WFTDA	N/A	4 D2
2018	9 WFTDA	2 CC Europe	NA
