= Tiger Bay Brawlers =

Roller derby league

- Metro area: Cardiff
- Country: United Kingdom
- Founded: 2010
- Teams: All-Stars (A team); B-Bombs (B team)
- Track type: Flat
- Venue: Cardiff University
- Affiliations: WFTDA
- Org. type: Private company limited by guarantee
- Website: brawlers.co.uk

Tiger Bay Brawlers (TBB) is a women's flat track roller derby league based in Cardiff, Wales. Founded in April 2010, the league has two teams that compete against teams from other leagues. Tiger Bay is a member of the United Kingdom Roller Derby Association (UKRDA) and the Women's Flat Track Derby Association (WFTDA).

== History and organisation ==
The Tiger Bay Brawlers was founded in 2010. The league's A team started bouting in January 2011, hosting the first ever public roller derby bout in Wales as they took on the Bristol Harbour Harlots, winning the bout 173–37. Of the nine bouts the Brawlers' A team played in this first year they only lost two. Their first recruitment day was held in March 2010 which saw the league double in size, enabling them to establish and debut their B team in October 2011.

In 2011 three members of the Tiger Bay Brawlers were selected to play for the Midlands Massive – an all star team made of skaters around the UK.

Opening their 2012 bouting season, the Tiger Bay Brawlers took on the London Rollergirls' Ultraviolent Femmes in Earls Court, London, a game they lost.

In July 2012, Tiger Bay was accepted as a member of the WFTDA Apprentice Program, and it became a full member of the WFTDA in June 2013.

In February 2013, the Tiger Bay Brawlers became the first ever European team to win against the London Rollergirls' B-team, the Brawl Saints. In May 2013 Tiger Bay Brawlers were runners up in their first European tournament, 2013: A Skate Odyssey, in Ghent, Belgium. They narrowly lost to the Berlin Bombshells.

The Tiger Bay Brawlers is run by a voluntary management committee made up of league members including skaters, non-skating officials and referees. The management committee make decisions that affect the whole league and meet once a month to establish priorities and coordinate activities. Sub-committees involve all league members in the league operations and an annual AGM establishes objectives going forwards. The league's home bouts are played between Talybont Sports Hall at Cardiff University, and the Newport Centre.

== WFTDA rankings ==
Season	Final ranking	Playoffs	Championship
2013	124 WFTDA	DNQ	DNQ
2014	68 WFTDA	DNQ	DNQ
2015	90 WFTDA	DNQ	DNQ
2016	75 WFTDA	DNQ	DNQ
2017	87 WFTDA	DNQ	DNQ
2018	49 WFTDA	DNQ	DNQ
2019	47 WFTDA	DNQ	DNQ
2020	52 WFTDA	DNQ	DNQ

== In the media ==
As a league the Tiger Bay Brawlers secured a Welsh language roller derby feature on S4C and also secured coverage on BBC Sport Wales.

== Junior league ==
In 2012, Sport.Cardiff announced in partnership with The Tiger Bay Brawlers the establishment of a junior roller derby league through the 5x60 initiative. Slightly different from the main league, the juniors play to the Junior Roller Derby Association (JRDA) rules set.

The Tiger Bay Brawlers hosted Europe's first-ever public Junior bout on Saturday, 8 December 2012 at Talybont Sports Centre, Cardiff.
