= Amsterdam Roller Derby =

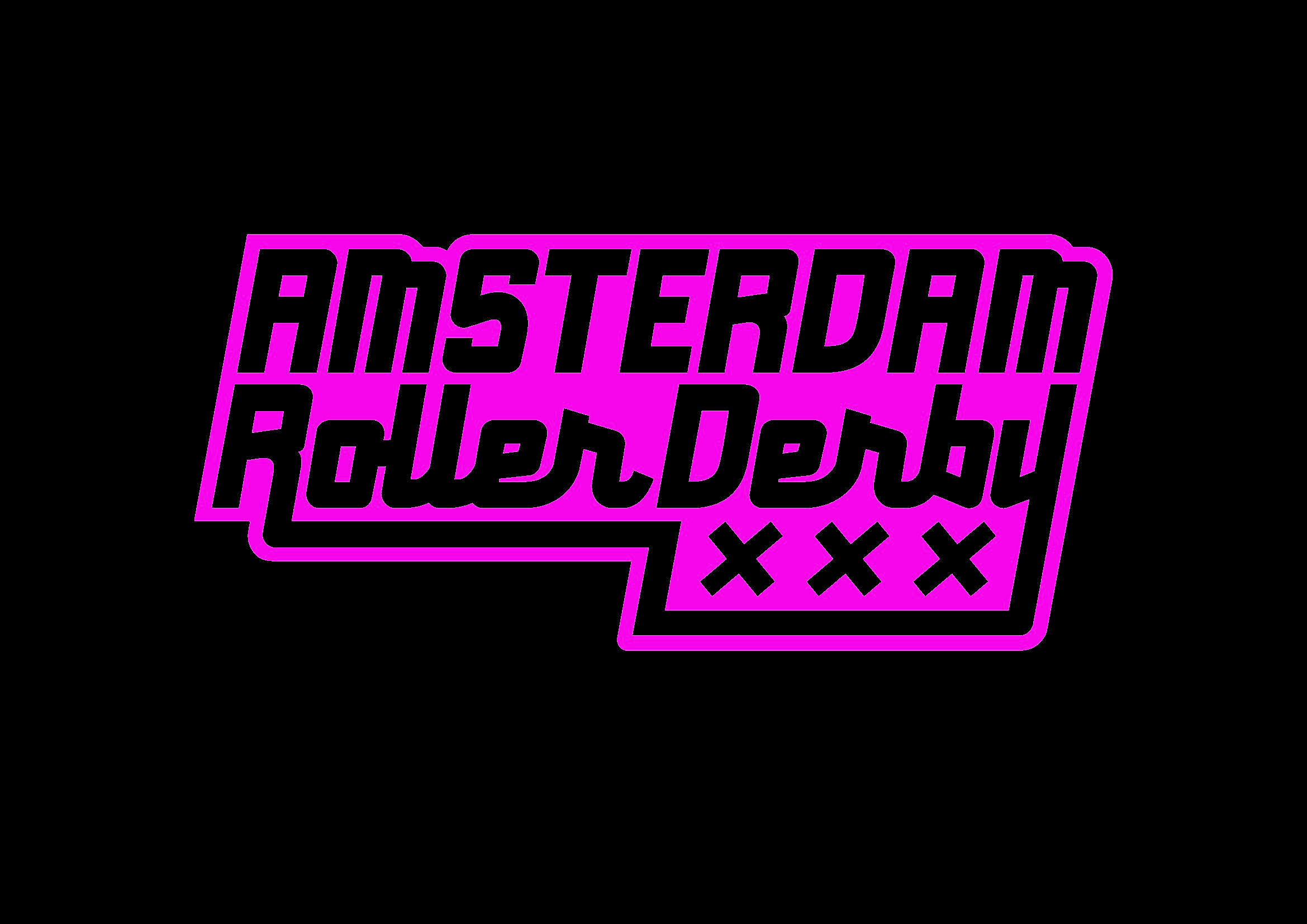
- Metro area: Amsterdam
- Country: Netherlands
- Founded: 2009
- Teams: All Stars (A team); BattleStars (B team)
- Track type: Flat
- Venue: Sporthal Zeeburg and De Weeren
- Affiliations: WFTDA
- Website: www.amsterdamrollerderby.nl

Amsterdam Roller Derby is a women's flat track roller derby league based in Amsterdam, Netherlands. Founded in 2009, the league consists of two teams which compete against teams from other leagues, and is a member of the Women's Flat Track Derby Association (WFTDA).

== History ==
Amsterdam Roller Derby was founded in 2009 as the Amsterdam Derby Dames, the first league in the Netherlands. By 2010, it was one of four leagues in the country, and in 2011 it was featured on national television, on "Hart Van Nederland".

In October 2013, Amsterdam was accepted as a member of the Women's Flat Track Derby Association Apprentice Programme and Amsterdam became a WFTDA full member league in December 2014.

The team was founded as "Amsterdam Derby Dames", and in 2017, the organisation rebranded as "Amsterdam Roller Derby".

In early 2018, the B team known as the B.ADD Girls were renamed the "BattleStars".

== WFTDA rankings ==
Season	Final ranking	Playoffs	Championship
2015	200 WFTDA	DNQ	DNQ
2016	248 WFTDA	DNQ	DNQ
2017	144 WFTDA	DNQ	DNQ
2018	117 WFTDA	DNQ	DNQ
2019	114 WFTDA	DNQ	DNQ
