= Antwerp Roller Derby =

Roller derby league

- Metro area: Antwerp
- Country: Belgium
- Founded: 2010
- Teams: One Love Roller Derby (A team); Pack of Destruction (B team)
- Track type: Flat
- Affiliations: WFTDA
- Website: www.antwerprollerderby.be

Antwerp Roller Derby is a women's flat track roller derby league based in Antwerp, Belgium. Founded in 2010, the league currently consists of two teams which compete against teams from other leagues. Both teams are ranked in the Women's Flat Track Derby Association (WFTDA).

== History ==
Antwerp Roller Derby was founded as One Love Roller Dolls in February 2010 by four local women: Lolli Chop, An C Hammer, Cherry Moshpit and Queen Sil. It affiliated with the local roller skating club, Kon Klopstokia RHC, thereby gaining access to its training facilities.

One Love Roller Dolls was the second roller derby league established in Belgium, and in December 2011, One Love and the Gent Go-Go Rollergirls were named as the top two Belgian leagues by Het Laatste Nieuws.

In July 2012, One Love was accepted as a member of the Women's Flat Track Derby Association Apprentice Programme. In October 2014 the league graduated to be a full WFTDA member.

In 2018 the league changed their name to Antwerp Roller Derby.

== Games and tournaments ==
The One Love Roller Dolls have played numerous games and several tournaments (in and outside Belgium) in their career, which helped them establish an impressive position on the European Rankings. They are also organizers of the Benelux tournament Skates of Glory and the international tournament Holy Duck.

== WFTDA rankings ==
Season	Final ranking	Playoffs	Championship
2015	175 WFTDA	DNQ	DNQ
2016	149 WFTDA	DNQ	DNQ
2017	114 WFTDA	DNQ	DNQ
2018	98 WFTDA	DNQ	DNQ
2019	41 WFTDA	DNQ	DNQ
2024	8 Europe WFTDA	5	DNQ
