= Crime City Rollers =

Roller derby league

- Metro area: Malmö
- Country: Sweden
- Founded: 2010
- Teams: A team B team C team Juniors
- Track type: Flat
- Venue: Crime City Hall
- Affiliations: WFTDA
- Website: www.crimecityrollers.com

Crime City Rollers is a women's flat track roller derby league based in Malmö, Sweden.

Established in 2010, the Crime City Rollers comprises one home team and two traveling teams representing the league in competition with other leagues. The Crime City Rollers were accepted as an apprentice league of the Women's Flat Track Derby Association (WFTDA) in July 2011, and became full members of the association in June 2012.

Eleven skaters from Crime City Rollers were selected for Team Sweden at the 2011 Roller Derby World Cup, and one was selected for Team Finland.

== WFTDA competition ==
In 2015, Crime City first qualified for WFTDA Division 1 Playoffs, entering the Dallas tournament as the eighth seed and ultimately finishing in sixth place. In 2016, Crime City returned to Division 1 Playoffs, entering the Columbia tournament as the seventh seed and finishing in sixth place again. In 2017, Crime City hosted a Division 1 Playoff, the first WFTDA Playoff to be held outside of North America. The fourth seed in Malmö, Crime City won their quarterfinal against Helsinki Roller Derby 215–170, qualifying them for WFTDA Championships for the first time. After dropping their semifinal to Gotham Girls Roller Derby 237–65, Crime City also lost the third-place game to London Rollergirls 181-138 and finished in fourth place. Crime City finished outside the medals at Championships in Philadelphia, losing a tight game to Montreal Roller Derby 133-129 and to Arch Rival Roller Derby 220–160.

In 2018, Crime City took second place at the WFTDA Playoff in A Coruña, Spain, losing the title game 342–149 to Arch Rival. At Championships in New Orleans, Crime City again faced Montreal in the opening game of the weekend, and again lost to them by 4 points, this time 184–180. Crime City then rebounded in the consolation round, where they won at the Championships for the first time, 173–160 over Jacksonville Roller Derby. In 2019, Crime City qualified for the WFTDA Playoffs in Seattle as the eighth seed, but lost their opening game to Philly Roller Derby 156–104 and did not advance to the Championships. Crime City did not participate in WFTDA-sanctioned events during 2020 and 2021 due to the suspension of competitive play in response to the COVID-19 pandemic. In 2022, Crime City won the WFTDA European Continental Cup, defeating Nantes, Stockholm, and Toulouse, and also claimed the Swedish national championship.

In 2023, Crime City defended their Swedish championship title and finished fourth at the EuroCup tournament in Manchester, posting a narrow loss to Montreal during the season.

In 2024, Crime City again won the Swedish championship and captured the European regional title with victories over Stockholm and Toulouse, qualifying them for the WFTDA Global Championships in Portland, where they won their seeding game but lost in the quarterfinals to Denver.

In 2025, Crime City claimed their eight win in the Swedish championships, and won a Malmö triple-header event with victories over Helsinki and London Brawling.

Crime City Rollers won their ninth gold in the Swedish championships in 2026. In June of 2026 the team came in fourth place at the European Regional Championships in Namur, Belgium.

In October 2026 Crime City Rollers is hosting - and competing in - the WFTDA Global Championships in Baltiska hallen in Malmö.

=== Rankings ===
Season	Final ranking	Playoffs	Championship
2013	126 WFTDA	N/A	N/A
2014	89 WFTDA	N/A	N/A
2015	25 WFTDA	6 D1	DNQ
2016	13 WFTDA	6 D1	DNQ
2017	10 WFTDA	4 D1	CR D1
2018	10 WFTDA	2	CR

- CR = consolation round

== Played games ==
past bouting history as of June 2013
Date	Place	Teams
2013-06-15	Essen, Germany	CCR-B Vs Ruhrpott Roller Girls: Devil Dolls
2013-05-12	WFTDA tournament – Gent	CCR-A Vs Gent GO-GO Girls: 233–134
2013-05-11	WFTDA tournament – Gent	CCR-A Vs Stockholm roller derby: 245–188
2013-05-11	WFTDA tournament – Gent	CCR-A Vs Lincolnshire Bombers Rollergirls: 311–98
2013-05-10	WFTDA tournament – Gent	CCR-A Vs Tiger bay brawlers: 212–244
2013-04-27	Copenhagen	CCR-A Vs Copenhagen Rolling heartbreakers: 239–59
2013-04-27	Copenhagen	CCR-B Vs Copenhagen Kick ass cuties: 308–106
2013-04-06	Malmö	CCR-A Vs Gent GO-GO roller girls: 227–151
2013-04-06	Malmö	CCR-B Vs Zürich city rollergirlz: 304–105
2013-03-24	Manchester	CCR-A Vs Manchester Roller derby: 367–30
2013-03-23	Manchester	CCR-A Vs Rainy city roller girls: 171–214
2013-02-24	Malmö	CCR-B Vs Nidaros Roller derby: 98–185
2013-02-16	Baltiska hallen, Malmö	CCR-A Vs Stockholm roller derby: 175–180
2013-02-16	Baltiska hallen, Malmö	CCR-B Vs Turku Dirty River RG: 181–194
2012-12-08	Helsinki, Finland	CCR-B Vs Kallio Rolling Rainbows: 55-339
2012-11-16	WFTDA Track Queens, Berlin	CCR-A Vs Leeds Rebel Roses: 115–152
2012-11-16	WFTDA Track Queens, Berlin	CCR-A Vs Gent Go-go RG: 135–239
2012-11-16	WFTDA Track Queens, Berlin	CCR-A Vs Irn Bruisers: 171–145
2012-11-16	WFTDA Track Queens, Berlin	CCR-A Vs Helsinki: 190–199
2012-11-10	Stuttgart, Germany	CCR-A Vs SVRG: 155–115
2012-10-27	Gothenburg, Sweden	CCR-B Vs GBGRD: 143–127
2012-10-13	Stockholm, Sweden	CCR-A Vs STRD A: 122–169
2012-09-29	Malmö, Baltiska Hallen	CCR-B Vs Helsinki B: 170–118
2012-09-29	Malmö, Baltiska Hallen	CCR-B Vs Oslo RD: 284–82
2012-06-09	Malmö, Limhamns Ishall	CCR A vs Irn Bruisers: 77–187
2012-06-09	Malmö, Limhamns Ishall	CCR B vs Cork City Firebirds: 111–179
2012-05-12	Berlin, Germany	CCR A vs Berlin Bombshells: 106–184
2012-04-21	Nottingham, England	CCR-A Vs Hellfire Harlots: 162–161
2012-04-14	Cork City, Ireland	CCR-B vs Cork City Firebirds 143–119
2012-03-17	Malmö, Baltiska Hallen	CCR-A Vs London Brawl Saints: 87-256
2012-03-17	Malmö, Baltiska Hallen	CCR-B Vs Luleå Slaughters Daughters: 274–46
2012-02-11	Malmö, Baltiska Hallen	CCR-B Vs Göteborg: 181–61
2012-02-11	Malmö, Baltiska Hallen	CCR Vs Paris: 165–112
2011-09-29	Glasgow, Scotland	Maiden GRRDRS: 143-141 CCR
2011-09-17	Malmö, Baltiska Hallen	CCR A vs Berlin B: 253 – 28
2011-09-17	Malmö, Baltiska Hallen	CCR B vs Stockholm Rollerderby: B 153 – 108
2011-09-29	”Nordic Lights” Malmö, Baltiska hallen	CCR vs. Kallio: 191 – 43
2011-09-29	”Nordic Lights” Malmö, Baltiska hallen	CCR vs. Copenhagen: 266 – 61
2011-09-29	”Nordic Lights” Malmö, Baltiska hallen	CCR vs. Helsinki: 212 – 76
2011-07-27	Malmö, Sweden	CCR vs London Rocking Rollers Rising Stars: 300 – 43
2011-06-18	Paris, France	CCR vs Paris Rollerderby: 91–78
2011-04-13	Malmö, Limhamns Sporthall	Mixed bout ”UK invades Crime City”
2011-03-13	Malmö, Limhamns Sporthall	CCR vs Stockholm Rollerderby: 132–88
