= 2018 Roller Derby World Cup =

International roller derby tournament

- 2018

Tournament information
- Sport: Roller derby
- Location: Manchester, England
- Dates: February 1, 2018–February 4, 2018
- Established: 2011
- Host: Rainy City Roller Derby
- Venue: EventCity
- Teams: 38 nations
- Website: rollerderbyworldcup.com

Final positions
- Champions: United States
- 1st runners-up: Australia
- 2nd runners-up: Canada

Tournament statistics
- Matches played: 92
- Points scored: 28533 (310.14 per match)
- MVP: (Australia) Tui Lyon
- Best Jammer: Sara Gilbert
- Best Blocker: Hulka
- Fan Favourite: Lady Trample

The 2018 Roller Derby World Cup was the third international women's Roller Derby World Cup, taking place on February 1–4 at EventCity, in Manchester, United Kingdom, with 38 teams competing. An international roller derby tournament, it was organised by a committee consisting of ten representatives from various areas of the roller derby community.

Some teams selected their skaters as early as October 2016, when the tournament was expected to be held in 2017.

USA Roller Derby successfully defended their title, defeating Team Australia in the final.

== Participating teams ==
Teams representing 38 countries participated. While most national teams are representing a country in the conventional sense, the members of Team Indigenous comprise skaters of Indigenous heritage from Canada, the United States, Argentina, New Zealand and Samoa. The Korean team does not specify North or South Korea in its name.

List of teams

- New Zealand (as Aotearoa)
- Argentina
- Australia
- Austria
- Belgium
- Brazil
- Canada
- Costa Rica
- Czech Republic
- Denmark
- England
- France
- Finland
- Germany
- Greece
- Iceland
- (Haudenosaunee) Indigenous
- Iran (as IRN)
- Ireland
- Italy
- Japan
- Korea
- Mexico
- Netherlands
- Norway
- Philippines
- Poland
- Portugal
- Romania
- Russia
- Scotland
- Spain
- Sweden
- Switzerland
- United States
- Wales
- West Indies
- South Africa (as ZA)

== Tournament structure ==
The tournament ran on four tracks over four days, with an opening round of short, 30-minute games on the first day to determine seedings for the second and third days, via a ranking algorithm. The second and third days saw two additional games for each team (for a total of four games guaranteed for all participants), resulting in a final rating and ranking by the same algorithm. The top eight teams in that ranking proceeded to an 8-way elimination tournament, with losing teams playing additional games for final ranking. The teams in positions ninth through sixteenth played one additional game for final ranking. (This system is essentially, a modified Swiss-system tournament for the first three days, with strengths for matchings derived from a power ranking, and Fontes-style matching of multiple games between recalculation of strengths.)

== Ranking Round ==
=== Blue Round ===
2018-02-01; 10:00	(Report)	Indigenous	67–91	Italy	Track 1 (S-One Helmet Co.)

2018-02-01; 10:00	(Report)	Iran	67–104	Switzerland	Track 3 (Roll Line)

2018-02-01; 10:30	(Report)	Mexico	245–6	Romania	Track 2 (Blood & Thunder)

2018-02-01; 10:30	(Report)	Austria	79–77	Russia	Track 4 (Rainy City Roller Derby)

2018-02-01; 11:00	(Report)	Canada	199–34	Wales	Track 1 (S-One Helmet Co.)

2018-02-01; 11:00	(Report)	Finland	131–53	Germany	Track 3 (Roll Line)

2018-02-01; 11:30	(Report)	Spain	120–43	Brazil	Track 2 (Blood & Thunder)

2018-02-01; 11:30	(Report)	Denmark	117–52	Portugal	Track 4 (Rainy City Roller Derby)

2018-02-01; 12:00	(Report)	France	47–166	United States	Track 1 (S-One Helmet Co.)

2018-02-01; 12:00	(Report)	Scotland	83–124	New Zealand	Track 3 (Roll Line)

2018-02-01; 12:30	(Report)	Greece	87–76	South Africa	Track 2 (Blood & Thunder)

2018-02-01; 12:30	(Report)	Belgium	6–180	Argentina	Track 4 (Rainy City Roller Derby)

2018-02-01; 13:00	(Report)	England	201–144	Korea	Track 1 (S-One Helmet Co.)

2018-02-01; 13:00	(Report)	Netherlands	82–79	Ireland	Track 3 (Roll Line)

2018-02-01; 13:30	(Report)	West Indies	11–238	Sweden	Track 2 (Blood & Thunder)

2018-02-01; 13:30	(Report)	Philippines	108–43	Czech Republic	Track 4 (Rainy City Roller Derby)

2018-02-01; 14:00	(Report)	Australia	259–10	Norway	Track 1 (S-One Helmet Co.)

2018-02-01; 14:00	(Report)	Japan	53–102	Poland	Track 3 (Roll Line)

2018-02-01; 14:30	(Report)	Costa Rica	36–141	Iceland	Track 2 (Blood & Thunder)

=== Pink Round ===
2018-02-01; 14:30	(Report)	Italy	114–30	Iran	Track 4 (Rainy City Roller Derby)

2018-02-01; 15:00	(Report)	Switzerland	30–153	Mexico	Track 1 (S-One Helmet Co.)

2018-02-01; 15:00	(Report)	Romania	41–149	Austria	Track 3 (Roll Line)

2018-02-01; 15:30	(Report)	Wales	54–185	France	Track 2 (Blood & Thunder)

2018-02-01; 15:30	(Report)	Brazil	89–80	Denmark	Track 4 (Rainy City Roller Derby)

2018-02-01; 16:00	(Report)	Russia	0–291	Canada	Track 1 (S-One Helmet Co.)

2018-02-01; 16:00	(Report)	Portugal	19–231	Finland	Track 3 (Roll Line)

2018-02-01; 16:30	(Report)	Germany	95–77	Scotland	Track 2 (Blood & Thunder)

2018-02-01; 16:30	(Report)	New Zealand	189–59	Greece	Track 4 (Rainy City Roller Derby)

2018-02-01; 17:00	(Report)	United States	190–15	Spain	Track 1 (S-One Helmet Co.)

2018-02-01; 17:00	(Report)	Korea	62–108	Belgium	Track 3 (Roll Line)

2018-02-01; 17:30	(Report)	Argentina	233–10	Netherlands	Track 2 (Blood & Thunder)

2018-02-01; 17:30	(Report)	Sweden	150–15	Philippines	Track 4 (Rainy City Roller Derby)

2018-02-01; 18:00	(Report)	South Africa	0–283	England	Track 1 (S-One Helmet Co.)

2018-02-01; 18:00	(Report)	Czech Republic	53–106	Japan	Track 3 (Roll Line)

2018-02-01; 18:30	(Report)	Norway	90–116	West Indies	Track 2 (Blood & Thunder)

2018-02-01; 18:30	(Report)	Poland	287–28	Costa Rica	Track 4 (Rainy City Roller Derby)

2018-02-01; 18:00	(Report)	Ireland	6–238	Australia	Track 1 (S-One Helmet Co.)

2018-02-01; 18:00	(Report)	Iceland	13–173	Indigenous	Track 3 (Roll Line)

=== Yellow Round ===
2018-02-02; 09:00	(Report)	Argentina	32–319	Australia	Track 1 (S-One Helmet Co.)

2018-02-02; 09:00	(Report)	Indigenous	107–140	Netherlands	Track 3 (Roll Line)

2018-02-02; 09:30	(Report)	Brazil	177–152	Iran	Track 2 (Blood & Thunder)

2018-02-02; 09:30	(Report)	Korea	154–285	Ireland	Track 4 (Rainy City Roller Derby)

2018-02-02; 11:00	(Report)	Canada	254–155	France	Track 1 (S-One Helmet Co.)

2018-02-02; 11:00	(Report)	West Indies	185–92	Poland	Track 3 (Roll Line)

2018-02-02; 11:30	(Report)	Norway	32–417	Finland	Track 2 (Blood & Thunder)

2018-02-02; 11:30	(Report)	Japan	175–220	Switzerland	Track 4 (Rainy City Roller Derby)

2018-02-02; 13:00	(Report)	Philippines	138–225	Spain	Track 1 (S-One Helmet Co.)

2018-02-02; 13:00	(Report)	Czech Republic	99–610	Germany	Track 3 (Roll Line)

2018-02-02; 13:30	(Report)	Belgium	280–111	Italy	Track 2 (Blood & Thunder)

2018-02-02; 13:30	(Report)	Romania	186–210	South Africa	Track 4 (Rainy City Roller Derby)

2018-02-02; 15:00	(Report)	England	308–21	Mexico	Track 1 (S-One Helmet Co.)

2018-02-02; 15:00	(Report)	Iceland	13–604	Scotland	Track 3 (Roll Line)

2018-02-02; 15:30	(Report)	Wales	21–469	United States	Track 2 (Blood & Thunder)

2018-02-02; 15:30	(Report)	Sweden	635–6	Russia	Track 4 (Rainy City Roller Derby)

2018-02-02; 17:00	(Report)	Costa Rica	112–501	Greece	Track 1 (S-One Helmet Co.)

2018-02-02; 17:00	(Report)	New Zealand	268–83	Denmark	Track 3 (Roll Line)

2018-02-02; 17:30	(Report)	Portugal	182–102	Austria	Track 2 (Blood & Thunder)

=== Green Round ===
2018-02-02; 17:30	(Report)	Netherlands	183–201	Brazil	Track 4 (Rainy City Roller Derby)

2018-02-02; 19:00	(Report)	United States	361–49	Argentina	Track 1 (S-One Helmet Co.)

2018-02-02; 19:00	(Report)	Iran	258–160	Korea	Track 3 (Roll Line)

2018-02-03; 09:30	(Report)	Austria	6–591	England	Track 1 (S-One Helmet Co.)

2018-02-03; 09:30	(Report)	Scotland	235–250	Wales	Track 3 (Roll Line)

2018-02-03; 10:00	(Report)	Ireland	287–84	West Indies	Track 2 (Blood & Thunder)

2018-02-03; 10:00	(Report)	Poland	131–285	Norway	Track 4 (Rainy City Roller Derby)

2018-02-03; 11:30	(Report)	Australia	331–62	Sweden	Track 1 (S-One Helmet Co.)

2018-02-03; 11:30	(Report)	Finland	465–18	Japan	Track 3 (Roll Line)

2018-02-03; 12:00	(Report)	Switzerland	121–151	Philippines	Track 2 (Blood & Thunder)

2018-02-03; 12:00	(Report)	Spain	476–41	Czech Republic	Track 4 (Rainy City Roller Derby)

2018-02-03; 13:30	(Report)	Greece	7–795	Canada	Track 1 (S-One Helmet Co.)

2018-02-03; 13:30	(Report)	Germany	218–139	Belgium	Track 3 (Roll Line)

2018-02-03; 14:00	(Report)	Italy	381–35	Iceland	Track 2 (Blood & Thunder)

2018-02-03; 14:00	(Report)	Denmark	225–134	Indigenous	Track 4 (Rainy City Roller Derby)

2018-02-03; 15:30	(Report)	Russia	232–116	Romania	Track 1 (S-One Helmet Co.)

2018-02-03; 15:30	(Report)	France	395–59	Portugal	Track 3 (Roll Line)

2018-02-03; 16:00	(Report)	Mexico	70–225	New Zealand	Track 2 (Blood & Thunder)

2018-02-03; 16:00	(Report)	South Africa	112–45	Costa Rica	Track 4 (Rainy City Roller Derby)

== Knockout stage ==
Fifth place
8	France	114
7	Finland	143
Seventh place
5	Sweden	197
6	Argentina	148

Consolation semifinals
8	France	130
5	Sweden	104
6	Argentina	127
7	Finland	141

Quarterfinals
1	Australia	238
8	France	47
4	England	205
5	Sweden	134
3	Canada	254
6	Argentina	70
2	United States	309
7	Finland	34

Semifinals
1	Australia	222
4	England	106
3	Canada	62
2	United States	274

Final
1	Australia	146
2	United States	187
Third place
4	England	147
3	Canada	173

=== Quarter-finals ===
2018-02-03; 19:30	(Report)	United States	309–34	Finland	Track 1 (S-One Helmet Co.)

2018-02-03; 19:30	(Report)	Canada	254–70	Argentina	Track 3 (Roll Line)

2018-02-03; 20:00	(Report)	Australia	238–47	France	Track 2 (Blood & Thunder)

2018-02-03; 20:00	(Report)	England	205–134	Sweden	Track 4 (Rainy City Roller Derby)

=== Classification games for 5th-8th place ===
2018-02-04; 10:00	(Report)	France	130–104	Sweden	Track 3 (Roll Line)

2018-02-04; 10:30	(Report)	Finland	141–127	Argentina	Track 4 (Rainy City Roller Derby)

=== Semi-finals ===
2018-02-04; 10:00	(Report)	United States	274–62	Canada	Track 1 (S-One Helmet Co.)

2018-02-04; 12:30	(Report)	Australia	222–106	England	Track 2 (Blood & Thunder)

== Final classification games ==
=== Match for 15th place ===
2018-02-04; 12:30	(Report)	Mexico	175–120	Belgium	Track 4 (Rainy City Roller Derby)

=== Match for 13th place ===
2018-02-04; 12:00	(Report)	Germany	143–108	Ireland	Track 3 (Roll Line)

=== Match for 11th place ===
2018-02-04; 10:30	(Report)	Wales	191–162	Scotland	Track 2 (Blood & Thunder)

=== Match for 9th place ===
2018-02-04; 12:00	(Report)	Aotearoa	116–149	Spain	Track 1 (S-One Helmet Co.)

=== Match for 7th place ===
2018-02-04; 14:30	(Report)	Sweden	197–148	Argentina	Track 4 (Rainy City Roller Derby)

=== Match for 5th place ===
2018-02-04; 14:30	(Report)	Finland	143–114	France	Track 2 (Blood & Thunder)

=== Third place play-off ===
2018-02-04; 17:30	(Report)	(bronze) Canada	173–147	England	Track 1 (S-One Helmet Co.)

=== Final ===
2018-02-04; 19:00	(Report)	(silver) Australia	146–187	United States (gold)	Track 1 (S-One Helmet Co.)

== Tournament team rankings ==
Pos.	Team	Pld	W	L	PF	PA	PD	Rtg
1	United States	7	7	0	1956	374	+1582	1713.0
2	Australia	7	6	1	1573	450	+1123	2044.7
3	Canada	7	6	1	2028	687	+1341	616.5
4	England	7	5	2	1841	700	+1141	552.2
Eliminated in the quarter-finals
5	Finland	7	6	1	1562	672	+890	314.8
6	France	7	3	4	1073	1018	+55	286.0
7	Sweden	7	4	3	1520	846	+674	394.7
8	Argentina	7	2	5	839	1108	-269	351.1
Classification games
9	Spain	5	4	1	985	528	+457	92.4
10	New Zealand	5	4	1	922	444	+478	96.6
11	Wales	5	2	3	550	1250	-700	87.6
12	Scotland	5	1	4	1161	673	+488	82.6
13	Germany	5	4	1	1119	554	+565	80.5
14	Ireland	5	2	3	765	701	+64	57.1
15	Mexico	5	3	2	664	689	-25	47.8
16	Belgium	5	2	3	653	746	-93	46.6
Eliminated in the ranking rounds
17	Philippines	4	2	2	412	539	-127	36.7
18	Denmark	4	2	2	505	543	-38	35.8
19	Brazil	4	3	1	510	535	-25	32.5
20	Norway	4	1	3	417	923	-506	31.0
21	Netherlands	4	2	2	415	620	-205	30.4
22	Korea	4	0	4	520	852	-332	29.8
23	Italy	4	3	1	697	412	+285	29.3
24	Iran	4	1	3	507	555	-48	24.2
25	West Indies	4	2	2	396	707	-311	23.6
26	Portugal	4	1	3	312	845	-533	23.5
27	Indigenous	4	1	3	481	469	+12	23.3
28	Switzerland	4	2	2	475	546	-71	21.4
29	Poland	4	2	2	612	551	+61	14.0
30	Japan	4	1	3	352	840	-488	13.9
31	Czech Republic	4	0	4	236	1300	-1064	10.3
32	Austria	4	2	2	336	891	-555	8.1
33	Greece	4	2	2	654	1172	-518	6.7
34	Russia	4	1	3	315	1121	-806	4.3
35	South Africa	4	2	2	398	601	-203	3.5
36	Iceland	4	1	3	202	1194	-992	2.4
37	Romania	4	0	4	349	836	-487	2.3
38	Costa Rica	4	0	4	221	1041	-820	1.0

== Exhibition matches ==
In addition to competition matches, three exhibition matches were played during the tournament.

2018-02-03; 18:00	(Report)	Baltic	252–194	Israel	Track 4 (Rainy City Roller Derby)

2018-02-04; 14:00	(Report)	Russia	244–183	Iceland	Track 3 (Roll Line)

=== International Juniors Expo ===
2018-02-04; 16:00	(Report)	Team Dolphins	263–172	Team Kingfishers	Track 1 (S-One Helmet Co.)

== Broadcast ==
The entire weekend was broadcast online via pay-per-view streaming, and the tournament's fourth day was additionally carried on BBC Sport.
