= Stuttgart Valley Roller Derby =

Roller derby league

- Metro area: Stuttgart
- Country: Germany
- Founded: 2006
- Teams: Hit Girls (A-team); The Bad Seeds (B-team)
- Track type: Flat
- Venue: SpOrt Stuttgart, Sporthalle West
- Affiliations: WFTDA, Deutscher Rollsport und Inline-Verband e.V.
- Website: http://www.svrd.de

Stuttgart Valley Roller Derby is a women's flat track roller derby league based in Stuttgart. Founded in 2006, the league currently consists of two teams which compete against teams from other leagues. Stuttgart is a member of the Women's Flat Track Derby Association (WFTDA).

== History ==
The league was founded as the Stuttgart Valley Roller Girlz and was the second to be founded in Europe, the same month as the London Rollergirls, founded in April 2006. The leagues did not initially know about the formation of each other. As it was the first roller derby league in Germany, it initially bouted against teams from the UK. SVRD played the London Rockin' Rollers in November 2007 in the first public bout in Europe between two leagues, and in June 2009, the first all-German game against Barock City Roller Derby.

The league fielded two women's teams around its conception. The A team, the Hit Girls, played in international WFTDA competition and Bundesliga national competition. The B team, the Bad Seeds, played against newer and mid-level European teams. However, as the league expanded, it was restructured to operate under one team and two types of game- FLINTA* and all-gender.

Other leagues began appearing in Germany in 2008 and 2009, with Stuttgart giving particular assistance to Bear City Roller Derby in organising itself. The Zurich Rollergirlz credit Stuttgart with helping organise Switzerland's first roller derby information meeting.

The first German Championship was held in December 2010 in Berlin, Stuttgart beating Bear City Roller Derby 128–124 in the final.

In October 2011, Stuttgart entered the WFTDA Apprentice Program, and it became a full member of the WFTDA in March 2013.

The team claimed the title of German Champions in 2010 and came in second place as the Vice Champions in 2013 and 2015. Stuttgart reclaimed the German Champions title in 2017.

== Competition ==
Ten of Stuttgart's skaters were selected for Team Germany at the 2011 Roller Derby World Cup, and one was selected for Team Brazil.

== WFTDA rankings ==
Season	Final ranking	Playoffs	Championship
2014	169 WFTDA	DNQ	DNQ
2015	164 WFTDA	DNQ	DNQ
2016	231 WFTDA	DNQ	DNQ
2017	258 WFTDA	DNQ	DNQ
2018	279 WFTDA	DNQ	DNQ
2019	246 WFTDA	DNQ	DNQ
2023	75 Europe	DNQ	DNQ
2024	76 Europe	DNQ	DNQ
