= Roller derby in Canada =

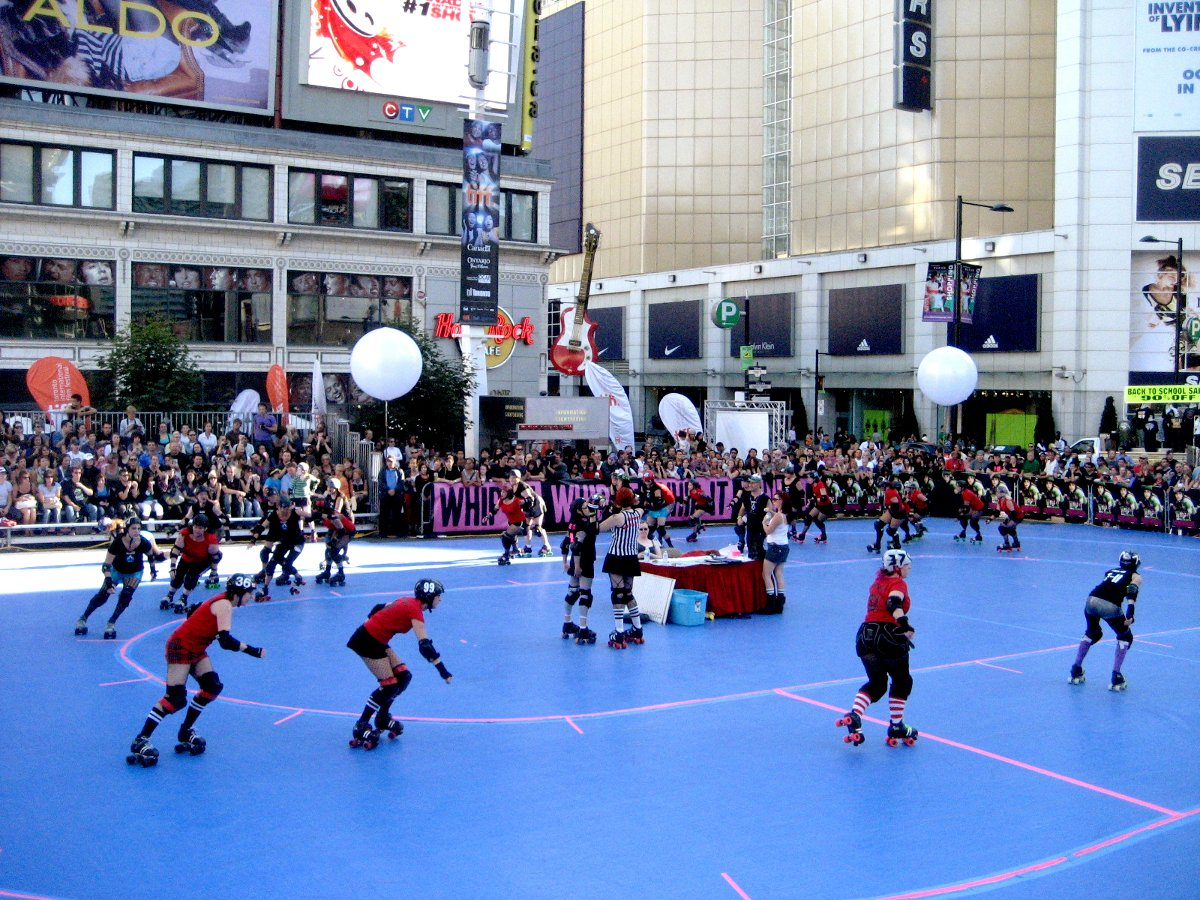
- Toronto Roller Derby skaters at Yonge-Dundas Square in Toronto, staging an exhibition bout for the premiere of the movie, "Whip It!" at the 2009 Toronto International Film Festival.

Canadian roller derby leagues were welcomed to join the Canadian Women's Flat Track Roller Derby Association, which in January 2012 was renamed the Roller Derby Association of Canada. The main governing body of flat-track roller derby is the Women's Flat Track Derby Association and Canada has its own subsidiary called WFTDI Canada (Women's Flat Track Derby International).

Junior roller derby leagues are eligible to join Junior Roller Derby Association Canada (JRDA Canada), the Canadian branch of the international governing body of junior roller derby.

The first Canadian team to be formed was Edmonton, Alberta's Oil City Roller Derby, founded under the name Oil City Derby Girls in 2005.

Team Canada is the national team that competes against other countries' teams at the Roller Derby World Cup.

== Leagues ==
=== Alberta ===
- Airdrie - Rocky View Roller Derby
- Calgary – Calgary Roller Derby
- Calgary - Chinook City Roller Derby League
- Edmonton – E-Ville Roller Derby
- Edmonton – Oil City Roller Derby
- Medicine Hat – Gas City Roller Derby
- Red Deer – Nuclear Free Roller Derby

=== British Columbia ===
- Chilliwack – NWO Roller Derby
- Kelowna – Okanagan Roller Derby
- Prince George – Rated PG Roller Derby
- Vancouver - Greater Vancouver Roller Derby Association
- Vancouver – Terminal City Roller Derby
- Victoria – Eves of Destruction
- West Kootenays – West Kootenay Roller Derby

=== Manitoba ===
- Winnipeg – Winnipeg Roller Derby League

=== New Brunswick ===
- Fredericton – Capital City Rollers
- Moncton – Muddy River Rollers
- Saint John – Fog City Rollers

=== Newfoundland and Labrador ===
- St. John's – 709 Roller Derby

=== Nova Scotia ===
- Halifax – Anchor City Rollers

=== Ontario ===
- Alliston – Renegade Derby Dames
- Barrie – South Simcoe Rebel Rollers
- Hamilton – Hammer City Roller Derby
- Kitchener-Waterloo Area – Tri-City Roller Derby
- Kingston – Kingston Roller Derby
- Guelph – Royal City Roller Derby
- London – Forest City Derby Girls
- London – London Middlesex Roller Derby
- Ottawa – Ottawa Roller Derby
- Ottawa – Ottawa Valley Roller Derby
- Peterborough - Peterborough Area Roller Derby
- St. Catharines - Niagara Roller Derby
- Sudbury – Nickel City Roller Derby
- Toronto – Hogtown Roller Derby
- Toronto – Toronto Roller Derby
- Whitby - Durham Region Roller Derby
- Windsor– Windsor Roller Derby
- Woodstock– Woodstock Roller Derby

=== Prince Edward Island ===
- Summerside - Wharf City Rollers

=== Quebec ===
- Montreal – Montreal Roller Derby
- Quebec City – Roller Derby Québec

=== Saskatchewan ===
- Regina – Pile O' Bones Derby Club
- Saskatoon – Saskatoon Roller Derby League
- Swift Current – Southwest Saskatchewan Roller Derby Association

== See also ==
- Roller derby
