= Forest City Roller Derby =

Women's roller derby league in London, Canada

- Metro area: London, Ontario
- Country: Canada
- Founded: 2006
- Teams: Timber Rollers (A team); Thames Fatales; Luscious Lunch Ladies
- Track type: Flat
- Venue: Western Fair District
- Affiliations: WFTDA
- Org. type: skater owned
- Website: www.forestcityrollerderby.ca

Forest City Roller Derby is a women's flat-track roller derby league based in London, Ontario. Founded in April 2006, Forest City is one of the first flat-track roller derby leagues in Canada, and is a not for profit organization owned and operated by the skaters. Forest City is a member of the Women's Flat Track Derby Association (WFTDA).

== History ==
Original Forest City logo

The league was formed as Forest City Derby Girls (FCDG) in 2006 as one of the original women's flat-track roller derby leagues in Canada, joining Terminal City Rollergirls, E-Ville Roller Derby, Hammer City Roller Girls, Toronto Roller Derby and Montreal Roller Derby. The league's first team, the London Thrashers, did not play any games in the inaugural year.

On July 7, 2007, Forest City Derby Girls played their first game against the Hammer City, losing 100-20. The Thames Fatles were formed in 2007, and later this year, FCDG had their first home bout, and the Thames Fatales beat the London Thrashers. In 2008, the Fatales and Thrashers played in the first Beast of the East tournament in Montreal. Both teams lost and were eliminated very early on. During the first official FCDG season, the Fatales dominated the Thrashers 2-1. The Fatales played in the "Virgin Suicides" tournament hosted by the Greater Toronto Area Rollergirls (GTAR) in the summer of 2008. After victories over the host team Derby Debutantes and the Tri-City Rollergirls' Vicious Dishes, they lost in the final to Hammer City's Death Row Dames.

In 2009, the Fatales played three games at Beast of the East but were eliminated by the Death Row Dames of Hammer City. The Fatales had a record of 3-3 for the season. In 2010, the Fatales played four games at Beast of the East and were eliminated by Les Filles Du Roi of Montreal Roller Derby. The Fatales had a record of 5-2 for the season. The Lunch Ladies team made their debut with wins against the Rollergettes (Toronto), Nickel City Roller Derby (Sudbury and Total Knock-Outs from Tri-City Rollergirls.

In 2010, the Fatales played a ten-game season going 6-4 including wins over Hammer City's Eh Team and Montreal's Les Filles du Roi. The Lunch Ladies, still considered the league rookie team, went 3-2 including another win over Tri-City's Total Knock-Outs. In 2011 Forest City sent a mixed team of veterans and rookies who won the CWRDA Eastern Championships in Ottawa, after defeating a Rideau Valley Roller Girls B team in the final. This was the first tournament win for Forest City.

In 2012 Forest City was accepted into the Women's Flat Track Derby Association Apprentice program and formed their new travel team, the Timber Rollers. The Luscious Lunch Ladies became a regular home team but also continued to play teams from other leagues, playing five games with their first losing record of 2-3. After a win over Royal City Roller Girls' Violet Uprising, they were bested by Tri-City's Total Knock-Outs as well as Rideau Valleys's Slaughter Daughters, one of the best home teams in Eastern Canada. The Fatales played to a record of 4-4, including their fifth consecutive Beast of the East tournament. Forest City sent another mixed team of veterans and rookies to the Roller Derby Association of Canada (formerly CWRDA) Eastern Region Championship in Guelph. Receiving a bye due to their previous year's victory, they defeated Royal City's Brute Leggers before losing in the final to Toronto's Bay Street Bruisers. Forest City finished the season playing their first games in their new home, the Western Fair District's Agriplex and had team tryouts for the Timber Rollers. 2012 also saw the formation of an affiliated men's league, the Forest City Derby Guys.

Forest City's first games of 2013 saw the Lunch Ladies beat the Thames Fatales by a score of 218-119, although the Fatales would go on to win the season series two games to one. The Fatales finished the season with a 4-5 record, and their second trip to the quarterfinals at Beast of the East. The Lunch Ladies finished their season at 3-4. The Timber Rollers started the season with four straight wins and finished with six wins and three losses. Forest City was accepted as a full WFTDA member league in September 2013, and the Timber Rollers played first sanctioned game against Lansing Derby Vixens, a 140-126 loss. Forest City's affiliated Men's League formed their first team, the Pack Men and played their debut bout against Ottawa's Slaughter Squad, taking a final jam victory 207-195.

In May 2018, the league announced a rebrand as Forest City Roller Derby.

== WFTDA rankings ==
Season	Final ranking	Playoffs	Championship
2014	154 WFTDA	DNQ	DNQ
2015	167 WFTDA	DNQ	DNQ
2016	167 WFTDA	DNQ	DNQ
2017	214 WFTDA	DNQ	DNQ
2018	149 WFTDA	DNQ	DNQ

== Teams ==
Currently Forest City features three teams, the Timber Rollers A team, Luscious Lunch Ladies, and the de facto home team of the Thames Fatales. The Thames Fatales are identified by their green and black uniforms, as well as their "Sexy Swamp Lady" logo. The London Thrashers were founded in 2006 as the first home team of FCDG, but disbanded in late 2008 to consolidate league members onto one team. They played one full season against the Thames Fatales and participated in the first Beast of the East in Montreal.

== In the wider community ==
Forest City has fielded skaters for various high level teams, including at the international level. Killson played for Team Canada at the 2011 Roller Derby World Cup in Toronto. Pepe le Punch played for Team France at the 2014 Roller Derby World Cup in Dallas, and again at the 2018 Roller Derby World Cup in Manchester. Jewels C Stars played for Team Ontario Roller Derby in 2014.

Forest City is considered to have originated the "double-fist pump" hand gesture to signify to teammates that a powerjam is happening.
