= London Roller Derby =

Roller derby league

- Metro area: London
- Country: United Kingdom
- Founded: April 2006
- Teams: London Brawling (A travel); Brawl Saints (B travel); Batter C Power (C travel); Docklands Fight Railway(D travel); Former home teams Steam Rollers; Suffra Jets; Ultraviolent Femmes; Harbour Grudges
- Track type(s): flat
- Affiliations: WFTDA
- Org. type: Private company limited by guarantee
- Website: https://www.londonrollerderby.com/

London Roller Derby is a flat track roller derby league and a member of the Women's Flat Track Derby Association (WFTDA). The league were founding members of the United Kingdom Roller Derby Association (UKRDA).

The league has four travel teams which play competitive roller derby across the UK and the world: London Brawling (A), Brawl Saints (B), Batter C Power (C) and Docklands Fight Railway (D).

== League history ==
Founded as London Rollergirls by Courtney Welch (derby name Bette Noir), Lauren Langston and Danielle West, London is the oldest roller derby league in the United Kingdom. Since London Rollergirls began in April 2006, the league has grown to include over 60 members, plus referees and support crew.

The London Rollergirls held the first public women's flat track roller derby bout held in the United Kingdom on 7 September 2007, to a sold-out crowd of over 500 people. The London Rollergirls held their first British inter-league bout in March 2008 against the Glasgow Roller Girls' Irn Bruisers, and their first international bout in June 2008 against Team Canada. This was a team made up of skaters from Toronto Roller Derby, Oil City Derby Girls, Terminal City Roller Girls, Calgary Roller Derby Association, and Saskatoon Roller Derby.

In July 2009, the London Rollergirls hosted Europe's first roller derby tournament, "Roll Britannia", featuring twelve teams from the UK and Germany. The tournament was held at the Earls Court Exhibition Centre at Earls Court. London won the tournament, and became the first champions of European roller derby.

On 4 November 2009, London Rollergirls joined the WFTDA Apprentice Program, and graduated to full membership in June 2010. London was the first league outside North America to become a member of the WFTDA. London won the British Airways Great Britons competition later that year, providing them with free tickets to fly to America in April 2010 to train with and play some of the top leagues in the world including Gotham Roller Girls.

Since 2020, spurred on by the Black Lives Matter movement and world events, the league have been working with Resist and Renew to move towards becoming an anti-racist league with equity for all.

In 2021, London Roller Derby teamed up with Wild Card Brewery to create three unique beers themed around roller derby team positions.

== League organisation ==
In 2010, London started a recreational league, which offered a training ground for skaters new to roller derby. Tryouts were required for recreational league skaters to enter the main London Rollergirls league and skate competitively. At the beginning of the 2019 season, the recreational league was disbanded and skaters of that strand were absorbed into the main league, leading to the creation of the D-team.

In August 2019, London announced a rebrand as London Roller Derby.

The league's legal entity London Rollergirls Limited is a private company limited by guarantee, and a not-for-profit organisation. The aims and objectives of the skater-owned and run league includes promoting athleticism, charity, teamwork and confidence in women, and aims to represent the diverse London area in regard to body shape, occupations, sexual orientation, race and nationality. The name "London Roller Derby" and their associated logo are registered trademarks owned by London Rollergirls Limited in the United Kingdom and Europe.

London Roller Derby is a D.I.Y. member-run organisation, with a board of directors and committees. League committees include: Administration, Bout Production, Events, Merchandising, Public Relations, Referees, Sponsorship, Coaching, Tech, and Venues. There are also visitor coordinators to provide hospitality to visitors from other roller derby leagues. League members are eligible to vote in league matters and participate on committees. London trains participants to roller skate and to play roller derby under a structured training programme. Although skaters are all women, non-binary or gender expansive people who feel that a WFTDA team best fits their identity, men are involved in all other league roles, such as skating and non-skating officials, support crew and announcers.

== National team representation ==
Eleven members of the London Rollergirls were selected to skate for Team England at the 2011 Roller Derby World Cup in Toronto: Fox Sake, Frightning Bolt, Grievous Bodily Charm, Juicy Lucy, Kamikaze Kitten, Metallikat, Ninjette, Raw Heidi, Shaolynn Scarlett, Stefanie Mainey (team captain) and Vagablonde. Ballistic Whistle was selected as Head Coach. In that year's competition, London skater Knickerblocker Glory represented Team Sweden and Bad Faith and Sinister Mary Clarence represented Team Ireland.

For the 2014 Roller Derby World Cup, there was again a strong representation of the league in the Team England lineup: Frightning Bolt, Goregasm, Grievous Bodily Charm, Hell Vetica Black, Jen Sykes, Juicy Lucy, Kamikaze Kitten, Kitty Decapitate, Lexi Lightspeed, Lorrae Evans, Olivia Coupe, Raw Heidi, ReLisa Kracken, Shaolynn Scarlett (team captain), Sophia Ann Loathing, Stefanie Mainey (vice-captain) and Total Frey-hem. Ballistic Whistle returned to the coaching team, joined by Stefanie Mainey. Sinister Mary Clarence was team coach for Team Ireland Roller Derby, while Sarah Oates was on the Team Scotland Roller Derby roster.

The 2018 Roller Derby World Cup Team England lineup featured the league's Gaz, Jack Attack, Just Jess, Katie Hellvetica Black (vice-captain), Kid Block, Kristen Lee, Onyeka Igwe, Rogue Runner, Shaolynn Scarlett (team captain), Stefanie Mainey and Trisha Smackanawa. Hester Wu was on the Team Ireland Roller Derby training squad but didn't make it to the final team. USA Roller Derby featured London skater Juke Boxx.

== WFTDA competition ==
London Rollergirls became the first non-USA team to break the Derby News Network (DNN) top 20 power rankings in May 2010, after a successful North American tour where they beat Providence Roller Derby, the CT RollerGirls, and lost by one point to the home team Philthy Britches from Philly Rollergirls.

In April 2011, London Rollergirls hosted the first WFTDA tournament outside of North America, and played host to Charm City Rollergirls (Baltimore), Montreal Roller Derby, and Steel City Derby Demons at Earls Court Exhibition Centre, London. In September 2011, London participated in the WFTDA Eastern Regional Tournament, 'Nightmare on 95'. They entered the competition as the tenth seed, and finished in fifth place – then the largest jump by a bottom-ranked team in WFTDA playoff history.

In September 2012, London Rollergirls again qualified for the WFTDA East Region Playoffs, entering the tournament as the sixth seed, and finishing in fourth place, again bettering their seeding and establishing themselves as the top non-US team worldwide. The first European Roller Derby Championships were held in Berlin in November 2012. London entered the tournament as the top seed and won the tournament, defeating hosts the Berlin Bombshells in the final.

A second North American tour in June 2013 saw London head to the west coast to take on five American and Canadian teams. Wins over Terminal City Rollergirls, Jet City Rollergirls and Rat City Rollergirls, and narrow losses to Rose City Rollers and Oly Rollers set London in a position to comfortably qualify for the 2013 WFTDA Playoffs. The London Rollergirls took part in the 2013 WFTDA Division 1 Playoffs, hosted in Fort Wayne, Indiana. At Fort Wayne, London took on Rose City Rollers, Denver Roller Dolls, and Montreal Roller Derby. London Brawling beat Rose City and Montreal, but lost to Denver. They entered the Playoff tournament as the fourth seed, and finished the tournament in third place, qualifying for that year's WFTDA Championships as the first team outside of North America to do so. In London's first Championship visit, they were eliminated after their first game when they lost to the Atlanta Rollergirls, 184–169.

=== Rankings ===
| Season | Final ranking | Playoffs | Championship |
|---|---|---|---|
| 2011 | 5 E | 5 E | DNQ |
| 2012 | 4 E | 4 E | DNQ |
| 2013 | 7 WFTDA | 3 D1 | 6 D1 |
| 2014 | 6 WFTDA | 1 D1 | 4 D1 |
| 2015 | 3 WFTDA | 1 D1 | 4 D1 |
| 2016 | 5 WFTDA | 1 D1 | 4 D1 |
| 2017 | 9 WFTDA | 3 D1 | CR D1 |
| 2018 | 11 WFTDA | 4 | DNQ |
| 2019 | 19 WFTDA | CR | DNQ |
| 2020 | 18 WFTDA | - | - |

*Please note that rankings were suspended in March 2020 in light of the COVID-19 pandemic.

- CR = consolation round

== Teams ==
London Roller Derby has an all-star travel team, London Brawling, whose name is inspired by the song London Calling by UK punk rock band The Clash. Official travel team/league colours are pink and black. London Roller Derby's B team, or reserves team, is called the London Brawl Saints, who debuted in June 2009. London Roller Derby's C team is called Batter C Power, inspired by the London landmark the Battersea Power Station, and debuted in autumn 2011. London Roller Derby added the D team, Dream Team, in 2019, which has since been known as the 'Pool' before renaming officially as Docklands Fight Railway for the 2025 season.

In summer of 2008, three permanent home league teams were formed: The Steam Rollers, The Suffra Jets, and the Ultraviolent Femmes. A fourth team, Harbour Grudges, had their debut in 2010.

- 2009 Season Champions – Suffra Jets

2nd – Steam Rollers, 3rd – Ultraviolent Femmes;

- 2010 Season Champions – Suffra Jets

2nd – Ultraviolent Femmes, 3rd – Steam Rollers;

- 2011 Season Champions – Steam Rollers

2nd – Harbour Grudges, 3rd – Suffra Jets, 4th – Ultraviolent Femmes;

- 2012 Season Champions – Harbour Grudges

2nd – Ultraviolent Femmes, 3rd – Steam Rollers, 4th – Suffra Jets;

- 2013 Season Champions – Ultraviolent Femmes

2nd – Steam Rollers, 3rd – Suffra Jets, 4th – Harbour Grudges.

== Notable bouts ==
Kamikaze Kitten rolling out with the LRG flag

7 September 2007: "The Great Rock n' Rollerderby Swindle"; first UK Roller Derby bout, intra-league bout; Team Pink 77 v Team Black 100.

29 March 2008: "Riots of Spring"; first LRG inter-league bout; London Brawling 163 v Irn Bruisers 31 (Glasgow Roller Girls' Travel Team).

7 June 2008: "Mutiny on the Mountie"; international inter-league bout; London Brawling 128 v Team Canada 45.

28 April 2009: "Grand Slam"; inter-league bout; Ultraviolent Femmes 171 v Barockcity Rollerderby 15; first UK intra-league championship bout, Suffra Jets 97 v Steam Rollers 73.

6 June 2009: "Double Trouble"; inter-league bout; London Brawl Saints (B team, debut bout) 156 v Leeds Roller Dolls 47, inter-league bout; London Brawling 249 v Birmingham Blitz Derby Dames 20.

18–19 June 2009: "Roll Britannia"; European tournament; London Rollergirls 1st, Birmingham Blitz Derby Dames 2nd, Glasgow Roller Girls 3rd.

20 March 2010: "A Fistful of Rollers"; inter-league bout; Hustlers (Texas Rollergirls home team) 84 vs London Brawling 63, inter-league bout; London Brawl Saints 79 v Irn Bruisers 19.

10, 17, 18 April 2010: "2010 East Coast Tour"; first UK team to play inter-league bouts in the USA. Philthy Britches (Philly Rollergirls home team) 103 vs London Brawling 102, CT RollerGirls 50 vs London Brawling 179, Providence Roller Derby 60 vs London Brawling 157.

9–10 April 2011: "Anarchy in the UK"; first full WFTDA-sanctioned bouts to be held in the UK. Four-way tournament featuring London Rollergirls, Charm City Roller Girls, Montreal Roller Derby and Steel City Derby Demons.

16–18 September 2011: "Nightmare on 95"; WFTDA East Region Playoffs. First team from outside North America to play at a regional playoff tournament. Having initially been seeded tenth, London managed to finish the tournament in fifth place with Stefanie Mainey picking up the honour of tournament MVP.

28–30 September 2012: "Sugarbush Showdown"; WFTDA East Region Playoffs. Entering the tournament as sixth seed, London defeated old rivals Montreal, before losing to Philly and Charm City to end the tournament in 4th place, narrowly missing out on a trip to Championships.

1–8 June 2013: "2013 West Coast Tour"; second major North American tour including first UK-Canada bout held in Canada, London defeating Terminal City Rollergirls of Vancouver. First win over a WFTDA Top Ten ranked team, defeating sixth-ranked Rat City Rollergirls.

In April 2014: London played Toronto Roller Derby's A-team, CN Power, at the Spectrum Centre in Guildford, defeating them 477–41.
