= 2011 Roller Derby World Cup =

International roller derby tournament

- 2011

Tournament information
- Sport: Roller derby
- Location: Toronto, Canada
- Dates: December 1, 2011–December 4, 2011
- Established: 2011
- Venue(s): The Bunker, Downsview Park
- Teams: 13 nations
- Website: rollerderbyworldcup.com

Final positions
- Champions: United States
- 1st runners-up: Canada
- 2nd runners-up: England

Tournament statistics
- Matches played: 37
- Points scored: 10263 (277.38 per match)
- MVP: Smack Daddy (Canada)

The 2011 Roller Derby World Cup was an international women's roller derby tournament organized by Blood & Thunder magazine. Teams of amateur skaters from around the world were fielded to compete for their respective nations.

The inaugural 2011 Roller Derby World Cup was hosted by Toronto Roller Derby, and was held December 1 through 4, 2011, at The Bunker at Downsview Park in Toronto, Ontario, Canada. It was won by Team USA, who beat Team Canada by a score of 336 points to 33 in the final.

Live online coverage of the entire event was broadcast on the Derby News Network.

== Participating countries ==
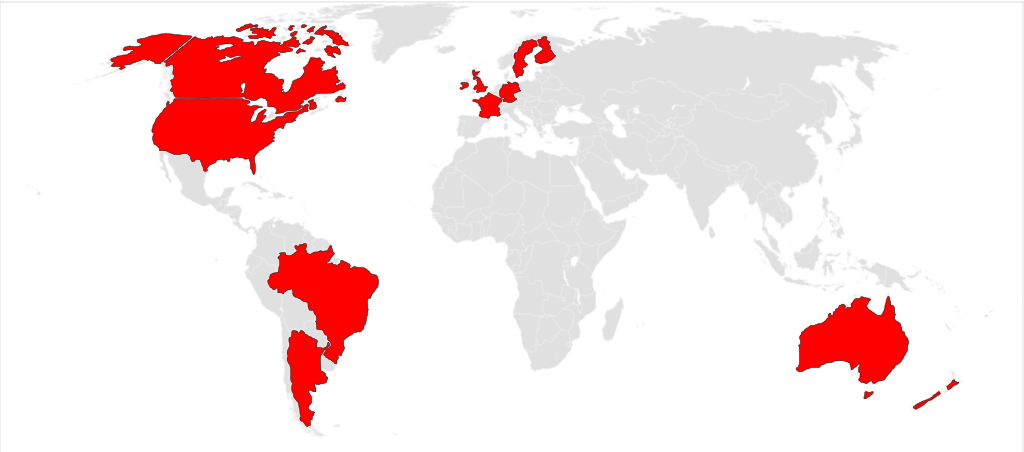
Countries sending teams to the World Cup (in red)

The 2011 Roller Derby World Cup had thirteen countries taking part. Each team sent a roster of 20 skaters, plus alternates, to take part. Though not affiliated with the Women's Flat Track Derby Association, the World Cup was played and officiated under a ruleset developed and standardized by the WFTDA. Teams held tryouts during 2011 and started naming the rosters in August. The participating countries were:

Country	Leagues sending skaters
Argentina	2x4 Roller Derby, Gotham Girls Roller Derby, Houston Roller Derby, Los Angeles Derby Dolls, Queen City Roller Girls, Windy City Rollers
Australia	Adelaide Roller Derby, Brisbane City Rollers, Canberra Roller Derby League, Coastal Assassins Roller Derby, Newcastle Roller Derby League, Sun State Roller Derby League, Sydney Roller Derby League, Victorian Roller Derby League
Brazil	Capital City Derby Dolls, Gotham Girls Roller Derby, Gray City Rebels, Ladies of HellTown, South Bay Derby Mizfits, Hell Girls From Oz Of Hell Stuttgart Valley Roller Girlz, Sugar Loathe Derby Girls
Canada	709 Derby Girls, E-Ville Roller Derby, Forest City Derby Girls, Houston Roller Derby, Montreal Roller Derby, Oil City Derby Girls, Pile O' Bones Derby Club, Red Deer Roller Derby Association, Rideau Valley Roller Girls, Terminal City Roller Girls, Toronto Roller Derby, Tri-City Roller Girls, West Kootenay Women's Roller Derby
England	Birmingham Blitz Dames, Central City Rollergirls, Dolly Rockit Rollers, Hellfire Harlots, Leeds Roller Dolls, London Rockin' Rollers, London Rollergirls, Rainy City Rollergirls
Finland	Bristol Roller Derby, Crime City Rollers, Dirty River Roller Grrrls, Helsinki Roller Derby, Kallio Rolling Rainbow, Tampere Rollin' Hos
France	DC Rollergirls, Les Petites Morts de Bordeaux, Montreal Roller Derby, Paris Rollergirls, Pioneer Valley Roller Derby, Roller Derby Metz Club, Roller Derby Toulouse
Germany	Barock City Roller Derby, Bear City Roller Derby, Harbor Girls Hamburg, Philly Rollergirls, Ruhrpott Roller Girls, Stuttgart Valley Roller Girlz
Ireland	Birmingham Blitz Dames, Cork City Firebirds, Dolly Rockit Rollers, Dublin Roller Girls, Glasgow Roller Girls, GTA Rollergirls, Kernow Rollers, London Rollergirls, Rat City Rollergirls,
New Zealand	Dead End Derby, Hellmilton Roller Ghouls, Mount Militia Derby Crew, Northland Nightmares, Pirate City Rollers, Richter City Roller Derby
Scotland	Auld Reekie Roller Girls, Glasgow Roller Girls, Granite City Roller Girls, SoCal Derby
Sweden	Crime City Rollers, London Rockin' Rollers, London Rollergirls, Stockholm Roller Derby.
United States	Boston Derby Dames, Charm City Rollergirls, Dutchland Rollers, Gotham Girls Roller Derby, Minnesota RollerGirls, Oly Rollers, Philly Rollergirls, Rocky Mountain Rollergirls, Rose City Rollers, Steel City Derby Demons, Windy City Rollers

== Final standings ==
The final standings at the completion of the World Cup games were:

1. United States
2. Canada
3. England
4. Australia
5. Finland
6. Sweden
7. France
8. New Zealand
9. Germany
10. Ireland
11. Scotland
12. Brazil
13. Argentina

== Group stage ==
All teams competed in the group stage. Each team was placed in one of four groups, which contained either three or four teams. Every team played all the other teams in their group, and this process determined the seeding for the elimination stage.

=== Group A ===
Team	Pld	W	L	PtsF	PtsA	PtD
Canada	3	3	0	848	50	+798
Sweden	3	2	1	299	272	+27
France	3	1	2	275	382	-107
Brazil	3	0	3	65	783	-718

Date	Result				Report
1 December 2011	Canada	244	17	France	
1 December 2011	Brazil	30	163	Sweden	
2 December 2011	Canada	196	26	Sweden	
2 December 2011	Brazil	28	212	France	
2 December 2011	France	46	110	Sweden	
2 December 2011	Brazil	7	408	Canada	

=== Group B ===
Team	Pld	W	L	PtsF	PtsA	PtD
Australia	2	2	0	315	82	+233
Germany	2	1	1	157	216	-59
Finland	2	0	2	109	283	-174

Date	Result				Report
1 December 2011	Australia	136	53	Germany	
1 December 2011	Australia	179	29	Finland	
2 December 2011	Finland	80	104	Germany	

=== Group C ===
Team	Pld	W	L	PtsF	PtsA	PtD
United States	2	2	0	812	9	+803
New Zealand	2	1	1	132	488	-356
Scotland	2	0	2	112	559	-447

Date	Result				Report
1 December 2011	New Zealand	8	377	United States	
2 December 2011	New Zealand	124	111	Scotland	
2 December 2011	Scotland	1	435	United States	

=== Group D ===
Team	Pld	W	L	PtsF	PtsA	PtD
England	2	2	0	472	95	+377
Ireland	2	1	1	228	250	-22
Argentina	2	0	2	82	437	-355

Date	Result				Report
1 December 2011	Argentina	51	164	Ireland	
2 December 2011	England	199	64	Ireland	
2 December 2011	Argentina	31	273	England	

== Elimination stage ==
=== Round 1 ===
In the first round of the elimination stage, the ten lowest ranked teams played. The winners advanced to the quarter-finals, while the losers entered the consolation stage.

Date	Result				Report
2 December 2011	Australia (4)	251	48	Scotland (13)	
2 December 2011	Argentina (12)	65	190	Sweden (5)	
2 December 2011	Brazil (11)	138	212	France (6)	
2 December 2011	Finland (10)	148	134	Ireland (7)	
3 December 2011	Germany (8)	127	142	New Zealand (9)	

=== Quarter finals ===
In the quarter-finals, the five winners from the round 1 were joined by the three top-ranked teams. The winners advanced to the semi-finals, while the losers entered round 2 of the consolation stage.

3 December 2011	Australia	126-80	Sweden
3 December 2011		(81-6)
3 December 2011		Report

3 December 2011	New Zealand	8-470	United States
3 December 2011		(5-237)
3 December 2011		Report

3 December 2011	England	383-14	France
3 December 2011		(181-12)
3 December 2011		Report

3 December 2011	Canada	499-11	Finland
3 December 2011		(278-11)
3 December 2011		Report

=== Semi finals ===
4 December 2011	Canada	161-90	England
4 December 2011		(78-51)
4 December 2011		Report

4 December 2011	Australia	4-532	United States
4 December 2011		(0-277)
4 December 2011		Report

=== Final ===
4 December 2011	Canada	33-336	United States
4 December 2011		(9-178)
4 December 2011		Report

== Consolation stage ==
=== Round 1 ===
Date	Result				Report
3 December 2011	Scotland (13)	114	91	Argentina (12)	

=== Round 2 ===
Date	Result				Report
3 December 2011	Brazil (11)	57	213	Ireland (7)	
3 December 2011	Germany (8)	104	41	Scotland (13)	

=== Consolation Semifinals ===
Date	Result				Report
3 December 2011	New Zealand (9)	66	94	Sweden (5)	
3 December 2011	Finland (10)	115	84	France (6)	

=== Placement round ===
Place	Date	Result				Report
11th Place	3 December 2011	Brazil (11)	64	113	Scotland (13)	
9th Place	3 December 2011	Germany (8)	116	60	Ireland (9)	
7th Place	4 December 2011	France (6)	180	129	New Zealand (9)	
5th Place	4 December 2011	Finland (10)	126	100	Sweden (5)	
3rd Place	4 December 2011	Australia (4)	85	203	England (3)	
