= Roller Derby Brasil =

Brazilian sports team

Team Brasil – Roller Derby Brasil
- Founded: 2011
- Colors: Green, yellow and blue
- Championships: 12th place at 2011 Roller Derby World Cup, 14th place at 2014 Roller Derby World Cup
- Broadcasters: Derby News Network
- Website: www.rollerderbybrasil.com www.facebook.com/rollerderbybrasil

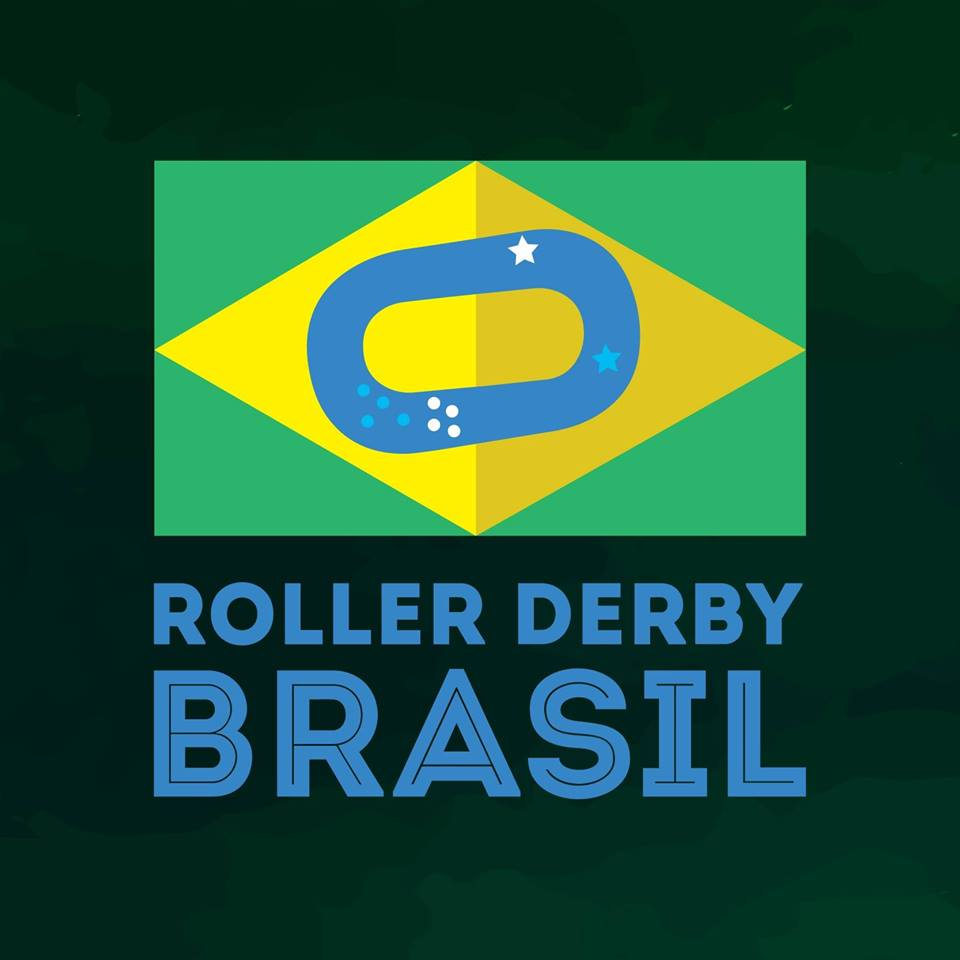
Team Brasil Logo

Roller Derby Brasil (Team Brasil) represents Brazil in women's international roller derby, such as at the Roller Derby World Cup.

Team Brasil is composed of roller derby players from Brazil, who are selected in tryouts to compete at the national level. Team Brasil is incorporated as a not-for-profit organization, run by the Brazilian skaters.

First formed in 2011, Team Brasil first competed at the 2011 Roller Derby World Cup, held in Toronto, Canada. The team's skaters, who ordinarily compete using derby names, chose to use single names at the 2011 World Cup, following in the tradition of Brazilian players in many sports, most notably soccer, which is arguably the biggest sport in Brazil. The 2011 placed #11 of 12 teams. In the 2014 World Cup, Team Brasil qualified for the second round of the tournament and placed #14 of 30 teams.

== Team roster ==
=== 2018 roster ===
Brazil announced its 2018 roster in January, 2018.

Number	Name	Derby name	League
18	Beatriz Lopes	Bia	Gray City Rebels
51	Julia Bonsai	Bonsai	Gray City Rebels
7	Fernanda Corrêa	Brazilian Nut	Gotham Girls Roller Derby
84	Natalia Caruso	Caruso	Sugar Loathe Derby Girls
67	Claudia Batista	Clau	Gray City Rebels
52	Cristina Helena	Cris	Thunder Rats Derby Squad
26	Sarah Gaither	Gaither	Rose City Rollers
666	Mari Green	Green	Gray City Rebels
42	Carmem Mecena	Karmemes	Thunder Rats Derby Squad
181	Lara Raineri	Lara	Gray City Rebels
420	Maria Emilia Glustak	Maria Loka	Blue Jay Rollers
90	Ana Clara Miranda	NaClara	Sugar Loathe Derby Girls
50	Celice Lopes	Psycho Cherry	Sugar Loathe Derby Girls
86	Mariana Leal	Pu	Gray City Rebels
16	Ren Tai	Ren Tai	
25	Roxane Velozo	Rox	Boston Roller Derby
Coach	Katherine Pavloski	Kethy	Ladies of Helltown
	Laís da Silveira	Lala	Sugar Loathe Derby Girls
	Rafael Assunção Verde	Verde	Gray City Rebels

=== 2017 roster ===
Brazil announced its 2017 team roster in October 2016.

Number	Name	Derby name	League
107	Andrea Carlsson	Kaia Pilsen	Gray City Rebels
91	Ana Clara Miranda	Naclara Portu'Gal	Sugar Loathe Derby Girls
18	Beatriz Lopes	9nha	Ladies of HellTown
Is.9	Chu Abreu	Chu The Preacher	Wheel of Fire Roller Derby
6	Claudia Batista	Docinho	Ladies of HellTown
16	Fernanda Correa	Brazilian Nut	Gotham Girls Roller Derby
87	Gilda Guimarães	Wasp	Gray City Rebels
00	Helena Agra	Ms. Mulder	Wheels of Fire Roller Derby
93	Jéssica Quevedo	Kira Yu-ki	Wheels of Fire Roller Derby
11	Julia Bistane	Bistane	Ladies of HellTown
51	Julia Bonsai	Banzai	Ladies Of HellTown
300	Juliane Póca	Esparta	Gray City Rebels
181	Lara Raineri	Yada Yada Lara	Gray City Rebels
173	Letícia Quintana	Tita Malibu	Wheels of Fire Roller Derby
24	Luana Viñas	Luvinhas	Gray City Rebels
4	Maira Vogt	Maira	Wheels of Fire Roller Derby
98	Marcella Moura	Cassie Uncaged	Gray City Rebels
86	Mariana Leal	Mary of Pain	Gray City Rebels
12	Paloma de Miranda	Loma	2x4 Roller Derby
84	Pat Albuquerque	Pat	Ladies of HellTown
43	Renata Wrobleski	Ren Tai	Ladies Of HellTown
23	Suelen Ferreira	Atom Cockroach	Sugar Loathe Derby Girls

=== 2014 roster ===
Brazil announced its 2014 team roster in December 2013.

Number	Name	Derby name	League
107	Andrea Carlsson	Kaia Pilsen	Gray City Rebels
1972	Amira Dutra Mello	Farrah Fracture	Bleeding Heartland Roller Derby
13	Bá Lisboa	Barberry	Ladies of HellTown
33	Camila Stocco	Psyko Pixie	Maui Roller Girls
9	Chu – Chiara Abreu	Chu The Preacher	Wheel of Fire Roller Derby
80	Fernanda Ezabella	Ferocity	Los Angeles Derby Dolls
16	Fernanda Correa	Brazilian Nut	Philly Roller Derby
87	Gilda Guimarães	Wasp	Gray City Rebels
55	Julia Magalhaes Beirao	Carnage Miranda	Ladies Of HellTown
7	Bianca	Lobster	Capital City Derby Dolls
44	Manu Vasconcelos	Vasconbully	Ladies Of HellTown
86	Mariana Leal	Mary of Pain	Gray City Rebels
72	Patricia Correia	Skate Middleton	Rio Riot Roller Derby
505	Paula Mitie	Spanish Lolla-Bye	Ladies Of HellTown
25	Roxane Velozo	Rainbow Crash	Boston Derby Dames
208	Shyrlei Braith	Shy-Hulk	Ladies Of HellTown
23	Tati Goes	Spider Mean	Gray City Rebels

Coaches 2014

Number	Name	Derby name	League
1949	Mariana Teixeira	Perly Streep	Gray City Rebels
181	Lara Raineri	Yada Yada Lara	Gray City Rebels

MVP 2014

The Most Valuable Player from Team Brasil at the second World Cup was Brazilian Nut, aka Nanda.

Team Brasil Logo 2011

=== 2011 roster ===
Brazil announced its initial team roster in August 2011. (league affiliations listed as of at the time of the announcement)

Number	Name	League
16	Brazilian Nut	Gotham Girls Roller Derby
26	Brazilian Bombshell	South Bay Derby Mizfits
9	Debbie Hatcher	Ladies of HellTown
107	Kaia Pilsen	Gray City Rebels
83	Kozmic Killa	Ladies of HellTown
7	Lobster	Capital City Derby Dolls
100	Lola Nolimits	Sugar Loathe Derby Girls
5	Mariah Bearings	Ladies of HellTown
777	Matadora	Stuttgart Valley Rollergirlz
33	Mojo'n Jet	Ladies of HellTown
1949	Peryl Streep	Gray City Rebels
72	Sugar Slum Fairy	Sugar Loathe Derby Girls
80	Ferocity	LA Derby Dolls
31	Atom Cockroach	Ladies of HellTown
181	Yada Yada Lara	Gray City Rebels

MVP 2011

The Most Valuable Player from team brasil at the first world cup was Brazilian Nut aka Nanda #16.

== 2011 World Cup ==
Team Brasil was one of thirteen countries to be represented at the inaugural Roller Derby World Cup, held in Toronto, Canada, in 2011. Team Brasil opened the tournament in the same group as Team Canada, Roller Derby France and Team Sweden and played 6 games overall during the weekend. In the group stage, each team played the others in their group once each. Team Brazil's first game was against Team Sweden, who won, 163–30, taking advantage of Team Brazil's relative inexperience. Gotham skater Brazilian Nut – competing as 'Fernanda' for the tournament – was the only skater for Brazil with WFTDA experience, and some skaters were playing their first public game ever.

In their second game, Brazil was dominated by the experience of Team Canada, who cruised to a relatively easy win, 408–7. In their third game of the group stage, Brazil lost to France, 212 to 28.

Team Brasil finished the group stage of the World Cup ranked eleventh, but then lost to Team France for the second time at the tournament, but by a far smaller margin than before, at 212 points to 138, in possibly their best game of the tournament. In the consolation stage, Team Brasil lost to both Team Ireland and Team Scotland, to finish the tournament in twelfth place.

== 2014 World Cup ==
Team Brasil was in Pool 2 which included Roller Derby Brasil, Roller Derby France, Team Portugal and Team Switzerland. France placed first in the pool, followed by (in order) Brazil, Portugal and Switzerland. After the pool round the top two teams from each pool were placed in a single elimination bracket. Roller Derby Brasil played Team Canada (roller derby) and was eliminated.

Scores

Teams	Score
Brazil vs Portugal	Brazil 167-139
France vs Brazil	France 315-14
Switzerland vs Brazil	Brazil 120-108
Canada vs Brazil	Canada 581-75
