= Chloé Seyrès =

French rollerskater

Personal information
- Nickname: Kozmic Bruise #B612
- Nationality: France
- Born: 14 July 1986 (age 39)
- Height: 1.55 m (5 ft 1 in)
- Weight: 54 kg (119 lb)
- Website: closeyres.jimdo.com kozmicdiary.blogspot.com

Sport
- Sport: Rollerskating
- Event(s): Freestyle, Roller Derby
- Club: Paris Rollergirls (2010–2013)
- Team: Roller Derby France (2011–2013); Paris RollerGirls All-Stars (2010–2013); International Seba Team (2007–2011); Freestyle French Team (2002–2007)

Achievements and titles
- World finals: Classic Freestyle World Champ. (2004, 2006) and Vice-Champ. (2007, 2008, 2010); Battle World Champ. (2008); Speed Slalom World Champ.(2008) and Vice-Champ. (2009, 2010).
- Regional finals: Classic Euro Champ. (2010); Battle Euro Champ. (2009, 2010); Speed Slalom Vice-Champ. (2009).
- National finals: Classic Champ. (2005, 2006, 2008); Battle Champ. (2009, 2010); Speed Slalom Champ. (2007, 2009, 2010).
- Highest world ranking: Freestyle World No.1 (Jan.07-Sept.08 / Mar.09-Mar.10 / May.10-Sept.10); Speed Slalom World No.1 (Jan.07-Sept.10).
- Updated on 12 September 2013

Chloé Seyrès (14 July 1986) is an all-rounder in the field of rollerskating, a multiple world champion in inline freestyle slalom and a member of the French Team of roller derby, where she is known as Kozmic Bruise #B612.

== Freestyle (2001–2011) ==
=== Beginnings (1990s) ===
Born in Bordeaux, France, Seyrès started skating at the age of 3 and trained regularly at inline ramp-skating during her teenage years, after having quit the ballet class of Bordeaux' Conservatoire. In 2001 she dropped aggressive skating for freestyle slalom when she discovered the discipline in a demo tour called Roller Aquitaine Tour.

=== Competitions (2002–2010) ===
Seyrès took part in her first competition one year later, for the 2002 National Championships held in Bordeaux. She won the co-ed Junior category in Classic Freestyle, which opened the door to her first sponsorship and a ticket to the French Team.

In 2004, after a year that saw her first international podium (third at Lausanne's co-ed international contest, 2003) and a first wave of Team France demos in France and close Europe, she stopped sports due to health problems and passes the French instructor certification level 1.

Seyrès was back on skates three weeks before the 2004 World Championships of Amsterdam, where she won the World Title in Classic for the first time, a feat she repeated in 2006 in Barcelona after an intensive training with partner Igor Cheremetieff.

Thanks to her good results, Seyrès joined the Seba Team, moved to Paris and traveled to the competitions, particularly in Europe, Asia and Eastern Europe, as well as the United States. She added other international titles to her list, including: World Champion in Speed slalom and Battle Freestyle at the 2008 Worlds in Singapore, European Battle Champion in 2009 and 2010 and Classic Champion in 2010, and she recorded 46 months of No.1 at the freestyle world ranking created in 2007, being the most decorated slalomer of her time.

Seyrès is specialized in freestyle slalom (battle and classic) but has shown her worth in speed slalom too, especially in remaining world No.1 for 3 years and 10 months uninterrupted.

=== Judging and reporting (2008–present) ===
Seyrès is still active in the world of freestyle as a judge and as a reporter.

She validated the battle judging part of the World Slalom Skaters Association (WSSA) program in 2008 in Singapore, and the whole exam in 2011 in Moscow. She is part of the judging team on international competitions including the World Championships (2011, 2012, 2013). She is also a trainer and examiner for the WSSA international judge trainings in Europe, as well as a member of the WSSA rules technical committee.

Since 2008, after completing five years of study in English linguistics research, her official competition write-ups of the World Slalom Series and freestyler interviews were published online at Rollerenligne.com and Worldslalomseries.com

== Roller derby (2010–present) ==
In 2010, Seyrès started a career in roller derby assuming the derby name "Kozmic Bruise". A sport in its infancy in France at the time, Seyrès joined Paris Rollergirls just three months after the league was founded. Seyrès completed her freestyle season and, in January 2011, began to focus solely on the derby league.

The league underwent intensive training by Amelia Scareheart and, in April 2011, the All-Stars from PRG played and won their first game. After only half a season, nearly the entire PRG team was selected for the first Roller Derby France team who took part in the inaugural Roller Derby World Cup in Toronto, Canada, December 2011.

After two games, Seyrès broke her knee on a landing against Team Sweden. She needed 11 months to be fully fit, alternating between intensive phases of physical therapy. She re-entered the Paris RollerGirls All-Star roster as a jammer for the 2013 season.

== Others disciplines ==
=== The All-Rounder ===
All through her skating years, Seyrès experienced several disciplines, including ramp skating, free skating, skate cross and roller dance. Her dance crew "SkateXpress" was created in 2011 and is based in Paris. It is part of the artistic collective 'La Main' and of the skating association 'GossipSkate'.

=== Coaching ===
Seyrès is a qualified instructor for the coaching of both the basics of skating (BIF, French Certification level 1) and freestyle skating (ICP Slalom). She coached freestyle skating weekly in different skating associations:

- SPUC Pessac 2004-2006
- Miss'Iles Paris 2008
- Enrolleres Paris 2010
- SDUS Saint Denis 2011

Seyrès was the head coach of the Paris Rollergirls in 2011-2013 and she runs derby workshops focusing on the basics of skating, adapted to derby.

=== Sponsors ===
Seyrès' performance at the 2002 Nationals gave her the opportunity to be sponsored by sports shop Sports Aventure until 2005, when she was offered a deal with specialized skate shop Escape Outside. In 2007 she entered the International Seba Team which enabled her to travel the world for competitions until her freestyle retirement at the end of the 2010 season.

In switching to roller derby she was contacted by emerging brand CrazySkates for which she has been the European representative since 2011.

== Media ==
=== Freestyle videos ===
SeyrSeyrèss is the rollerskate girl in a 2004 viral YouTube video entitled Just a Girl, shot in Bordeaux at the occasion of the second freeskate video contest of RollerFR. Induced to participate in order to add a feminine touch to the contest, she ended up first in the votes.

In the summer of 2006 two videos were issued: the first was The Clopinettes' Gang with Clochette shot in Montpellier and to the sound of Seyres's electro-rock band Akouphën telling the fairytale of the two protagonists. The second one is SeyrSeyrèss's biggest hit video with Igor Cheremetieff Catch Me if You Can shot in Besançon, a revolution with a scenario and the highest European technical level of the time.

Seyrès and Cheremetieff did a second official video together in 2008 (issued in 2009), entitled Around the 20 where the pair picked 20 appropriate spots for the 20 districts of Paris, with 20 different soundtracks. It is an atmosphere video rather than a technical video and it was proposed, shot and edited by Kalou.

Seyrès also appeared in a profile video for the promotion of SebaSkates, shot on the docks of Paris. Entitled 2010 Winter Profile, it was a very short video with slow motion parts to the sound of the instrumental version of "Falling Up" featured on Akouphën's album ELEVEN.

=== Derby videos ===
A non-exhaustive list:

- Kozmic Bruise features on the compilation video of the Paris RollerGirls' 2012 Season by Marie Coquant
- Teaser of "Roller Derby Made in Europe" by Laetitia Rodari
- "Moulin Bruise the Movie" by the Blastart from the game against the London Rockin' Rollers (June 22, 2013)
- "PRG vs Windsor" by CelEye Kopp from the game against the Royal Windsor (Feb. 16, 2013)
