= Roller Derby Bordeaux =

Roller derby league

- Metro area: Bordeaux
- Country: France
- Founded: 2009
- Teams: Petites Morts de Bordeaux
- Track type(s): Flat
- Venue: Espace Roller Skate
- Affiliations: WFTDA; Fédération française de roller sports
- Website: rollerderbybordeaux.fr

Roller Derby Bordeaux is a women's flat track roller derby league based in Bordeaux in France. Founded in 2009, the league consists of a single team which competes against teams from other leagues.

== History ==
Founded in the summer of 2009, Bordeaux claims to have been the first roller derby league in France. In July 2010, they played the first flat track bout in France, against Roller Derby Toulouse. They again played Toulouse, and also the Paris Rollergirls, in a tournament the following summer.

Three skaters from the league (Belle Zebuth, Emi Wild and Karla Karschër) were selected to play for Roller Derby France at the 2011 Roller Derby World Cup.

By 2013, Bordeaux were working closely with STYX Roller Derby Bordeaux, a local men's league.

Bordeaux were founder members of the French Roller Derby Organisational Group (FROG), and in October 2013, were accepted as a member of the Women's Flat Track Derby Association Apprentice Programme.
