= RDAC =

RDAC may refer to:

- Digital potentiometer, also known as a Resistive Digital-to-Analog Converter
- Radioactinium, abbreviated RdAc, a name given at one time to 227 Th, an isotope of thorium
- Rebel Diaz Arts Collective, a community arts center in New York City
- Redundant Disk Array Controller, a type of computing hardware
- Roller Derby Association of Canada
- Randall Davey House and surrounding Randall Davey Audubon Centre
- Report of the Department of Antiquities, Cyprus, an archaeological journal
