= Tri-City Roller Derby =

Roller derby league

- Metro area: Kitchener, Ontario
- Country: Canada
- Founded: 2008
- Teams: Tri-City Thunder (A team); Plan B (B team); Venus Fly Tramps; Vicious Dishes; Total Knock-Outs
- Track type(s): Flat
- Venue: Various
- Affiliations: Women's Flat Track Derby Association
- Org. type: Skater Owned
- Website: http://www.tricityrd.com/

Tri-City Roller Derby is a women's flat-track roller derby league in Kitchener, Ontario. On December 1, 2010, Tri-City became the third Canadian roller derby league to be granted membership in the Women's Flat Track Derby Association, Having only completed two full home seasons, Tri-City gained membership status with WFTDA ahead of their Toronto-based sisters at Toronto Roller Derby.

== History and league structure ==
Tri-City has three house teams, the Vicious Dishes, the Venus Fly Tramps, and the Total Knock Outs, which play each other at home, as well as against other leagues' house teams. Then-league member Motorhead Molly played for Team Canada at the 2011 Roller Derby World Cup.

In December 2013 it was announced that Tri-City would be hosting a Division 2 tournament in 2014, August 22–24 at the Waterloo Memorial Recreation Complex. This was the first time a WFTDA playoff tournament was held outside the United States, and the tournament was won by Ottawa's Rideau Valley Roller Girls.

Originally known as Tri-City Roller Girls, in March 2014 the organization rebranded as Tri-City Roller Derby. Beginning in 2015, Tri-City hosts an annual invitational tournament called "Beaver Fever" at the Waterloo Memorial Recreation Complex.

Tri-City home games are regularly broadcast on Rogers TV in the Kitchener-Waterloo region.

The league run a junior roller derby program, Tri-City Junior Roller Derby, for children aged 9-17 years old to learn skating skills, and play games according to the Junior Roller Derby Association (JRDA) ruleset.

== WFTDA competition ==
The All-Star team, or Travel Team, The Tri-City Thunder, plays other leagues' All-Star/Travel Teams, and qualifies for WFTDA ranking. Plan B plays other leagues' B All-Star/Travel Teams but does not qualify for WFTDA rankings.

Tri-City originally skated in the North Central region, making them one of three Canadian leagues in that region; the others being Toronto and the Hammer City Roller Girls. Partway through 2013 WFTDA changed ranking systems removing the regions, and Tri-City made its first WFTDA Playoff appearance as a member of WFTDA Division 2 in August 2013, placing fifth in the tournament held in Kalamazoo, Michigan. Tri-City finished the 2013 season ranked 44th, placing them in the upper rankings of Division 2 for the 2014 season.

In 2014, Tri-City, while hosting a Division 2 Playoff, qualified for Division 1 Playoffs in Salt Lake City, as the tenth seed. After losing their first two games to Arch Rival Roller Girls and Montreal Roller Derby, Tri-City defeated the Oklahoma Victory Dolls 190-185 in overtime to claim ninth place.

Tri-City returned to D1 Playoffs in 2015 at Tucson as the tenth seed, losing to Terminal City Rollergirls, Charm City Roller Girls, and finally 239-170 to Arizona Roller Derby to finish in tenth place.

In 2016, Tri-City dropped into Division 2 Playoffs as the ninth seed in Lansing, Michigan, losing their opening game to Bear City Roller Derby 235-140. Tri-City then bounced back with victories over higher-seeded Nidaros Roller Derby and Sac City Rollers, before losing a rematch against Bear City in the fifth place game 177-153 to finish in sixth place.

=== Rankings ===
Season	Final ranking	Playoffs	Championship
2011	16 NC	DNQ	DNQ
2012	12 NC	DNQ	DNQ
2013	44 WFTDA	5 D2	DNQ
2014	46 WFTDA	9 D1	DNQ
2015	51 WFTDA	10 D1	DNQ
2016	58 WFTDA	6 D2	DNQ

== See also ==
- Roller derby
- History of roller derby
- List of roller derby leagues
