= WRD =

WRD may refer to:

== Observances ==
- World Rabies Day, on 28 September
- World Radio Day, on 13 February
- World Refrigeration Day, on 26 June
- World Religion Day, in January

== Organisations ==
- Oregon Water Resources Department, Oregon, United States
- Wasatch Roller Derby, Utah, United States
- Woodstock Roller Derby, Ontario, Canada

== Publications ==
- World report on disability, by the World Health Organization
- Worm Runner's Digest, a zoology journal

== Other uses ==
- WRD, a spurious ISO 639-3 language code
- Watts Reflected Decimal, a binary code format
