= Windsor Roller Derby =

Roller derby league

- Metro area: Windsor, ON
- Country: Canada
- Founded: July 2010
- Teams: All-Stars (A team); Canadian Clubbers (B team); Windsor A-Salt - Fresh Meat
- Track type: Flat
- Venue: The Atlas Tube Centre
- Affiliations: WFTDA, RDAC
- Website: windsorrollerderby.com

Windsor Roller Derby is a women's flat track roller derby league based in Windsor, Ontario. Founded as Border City Brawlers in 2010, the league is a member of the Women's Flat Track Derby Association (WFTDA).

== History and organization ==
Founded in July 2010, the league consists of The Border City Brawlers All Stars, who compete in WFTDA sanctioned games, the Canadian Clubbers, a B level travel team and the Windsor ASalts, a C level travel team.

By the start of 2012, the league had about fifty skaters, and was practicing at the Windsor Armories. However, the building was closed for renovation, forcing the training sessions to relocate.

In July 2012, the league was accepted into the Women's Flat Track Derby Association Apprentice Programme. In addition, its newer skaters took fourth place in a tournament hosted by Greater Toronto Area Rollergirls in Toronto. On December 23, 2013, Border City was made a full member in the WFTDA.

The league has also received media coverage for raising money for local charities at its bouts. In 2012, the league announced a new inclusive gender policy, affirming that transgender skaters are eligible to join, attracting media attention.

In 2015, Border City introduced a junior roller derby program for girls aged 12 to 17.

In 2019, the league announced a rebrand as Windsor Roller Derby, to better reflect the organization's core values.

== WFTDA rankings ==
Former Border City logo

Season	Final ranking	Playoffs	Championship
2014	179 WFTDA	DNQ	DNQ
2015	176 WFTDA	DNQ	DNQ
2016	245 WFTDA	DNQ	DNQ
2017	291 WFTDA	DNQ	DNQ
2018	NR	DNQ	DNQ

- NR = no rank assigned in this release
