= Supply Depot (Toronto) =

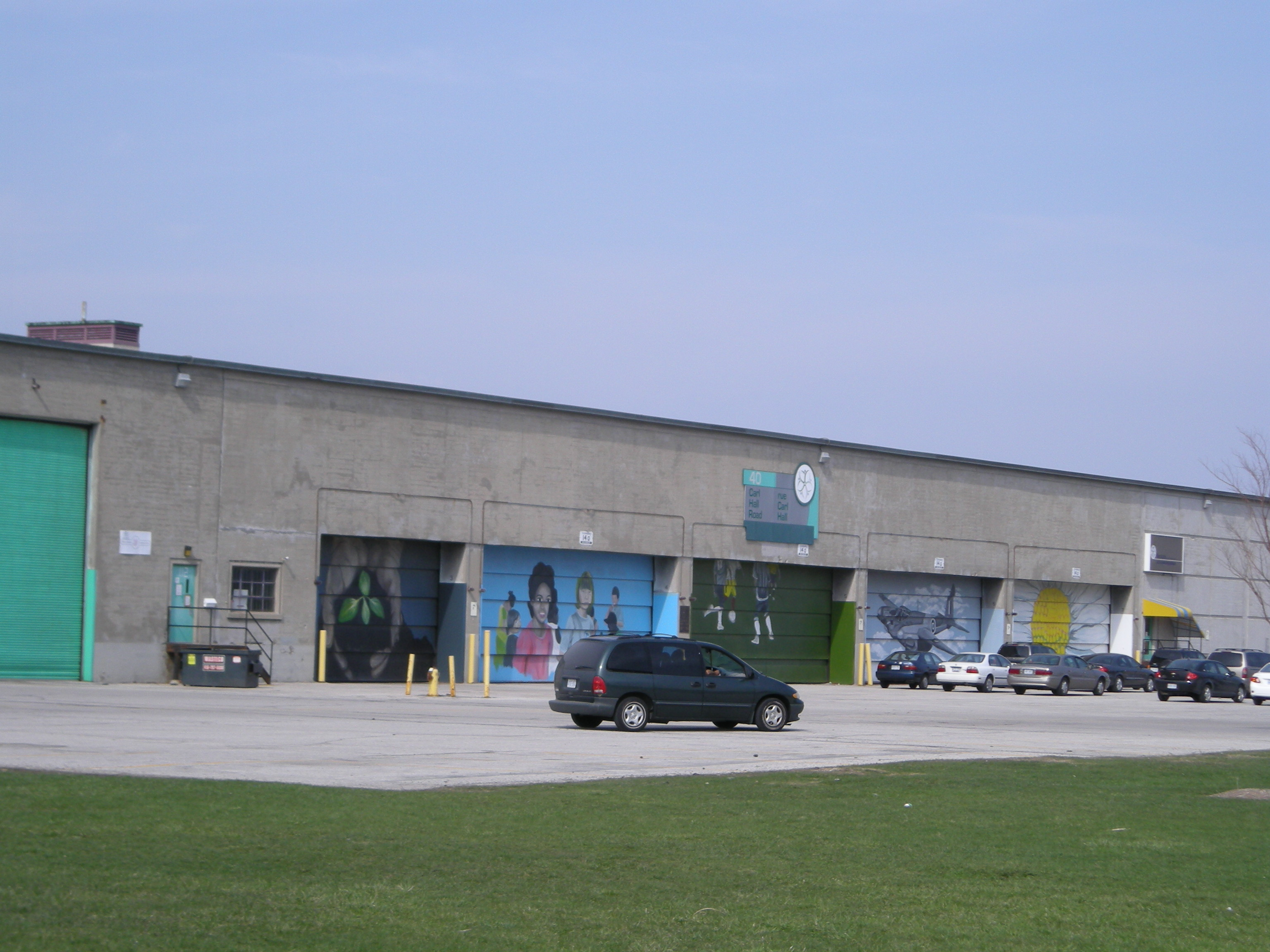
- The Supply Depot, from Carl Hall Road
- Alternative names: Building 151, Supply Depot #1, The Bunker

General information
- Type: Military, industrial
- Location: 40 Carl Hall Road, Toronto, Ontario, Canada
- Coordinates: 43.74985°N 79.47935°W
- Completed: 1954
- Owner: Downsview Park

Technical details
- Floor area: 81,470 m^{2} (876,900 sq ft)

Other information
- Parking: Outdoor

Website
- www.downsviewpark.ca

The Supply Depot is a large warehouse located at Downsview Park in Toronto, Ontario, Canada.

Built to withstand a non-nuclear attack, the former military structure is today used as a farmers' market, film studio, and venue for Toronto Roller Derby.

== History ==
In 1952, the Canadian federal government acquired an airfield and several buildings located in the then North York neighbourhood of Downsview. A de Havilland Canada aircraft production facility was already located on the property, and the site would eventually become Canadian Forces Base Downsview.

Several new structures were erected, including a large building which would be used for storage and shipping. Completed in 1954, the building consisted of a one-story 81,470 m^{2} (876,900 sq ft) warehouse with an adjoining two-story office building. de Havilland referred to the building as "Building 151" in accordance with a numbering system used by the company, and the Department of National Defence adopted this and officially named the structure "Building 151". The Treasury Board of Canada later referred to the building as "Supply Depot #1", and it was commonly called the "Supply Depot".

The Supply Depot's location was well-suited for shipping and receiving, with a Canadian National Railway mainline located along the building's east side, connected to the north side of the Supply Depot by a spur-line. The recently constructed Ontario Highway 401 was a short distance south. The building became the central supply location for the Canadian military, and contained small items such as screws and nails, as well as larger inventory like aircraft engines and wings. The warehouse portion of the Supply Depot was so expansive that workers moved from station to station using bicycles.

When CFB Downsview closed in 1996, a portion of the former base—including the Supply Depot—became part of Downsview Park, the first national urban park in Canada. In 1998, the Supply Depot became one of 11 properties at the site listed on a municipal heritage inventory.

== Design ==
The Supply Depot is a unique example of Cold War military construction in Canada, with heavily reinforced concrete used to create a fortress-like structure designed to survive a nuclear blast. The walls are 1.5 ft (0.46 m) thick, and the flat roof is a 2 ft (0.61 m) thick slab of exposed concrete supported by columns spaced 40 ft (12 m) apart.

In the Supply Depot's basement are two 6 ft (1.8 m) deep, 660,000 imp gal (3,000,000 L) water reservoirs used to supply the fire sprinkler system, and the roof was designed to store up to 1 ft (0.30 m) of water as a backup supply.

On the building's south side is a door leading to a "Decontamination Centre", where individuals could enter the Supply Depot following a nuclear attack. The heavily-reinforced building also contained a bomb shelter.

An architectural review from 2009 wrote, "the building was constructed during the period of Cold War and reflects the uncertain mood of the time with its tough envelope and back-up systems".

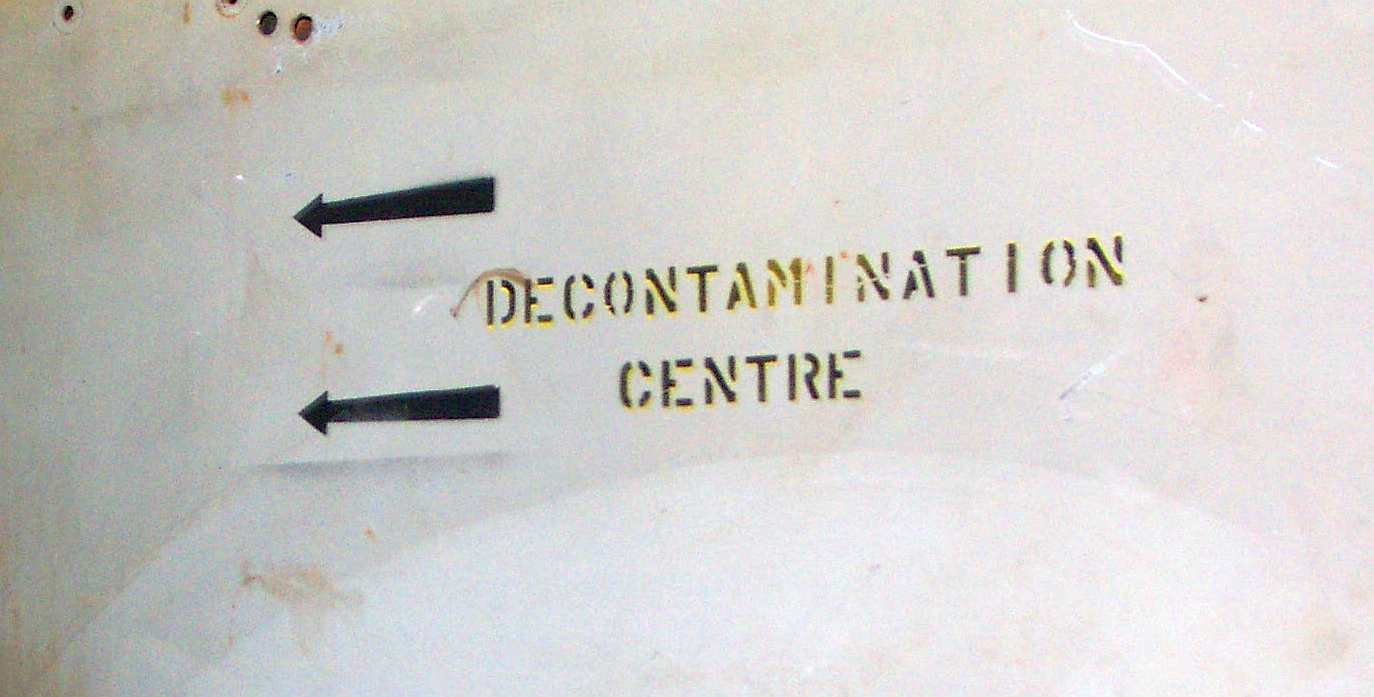
Entering Supply Depot after nuclear attack

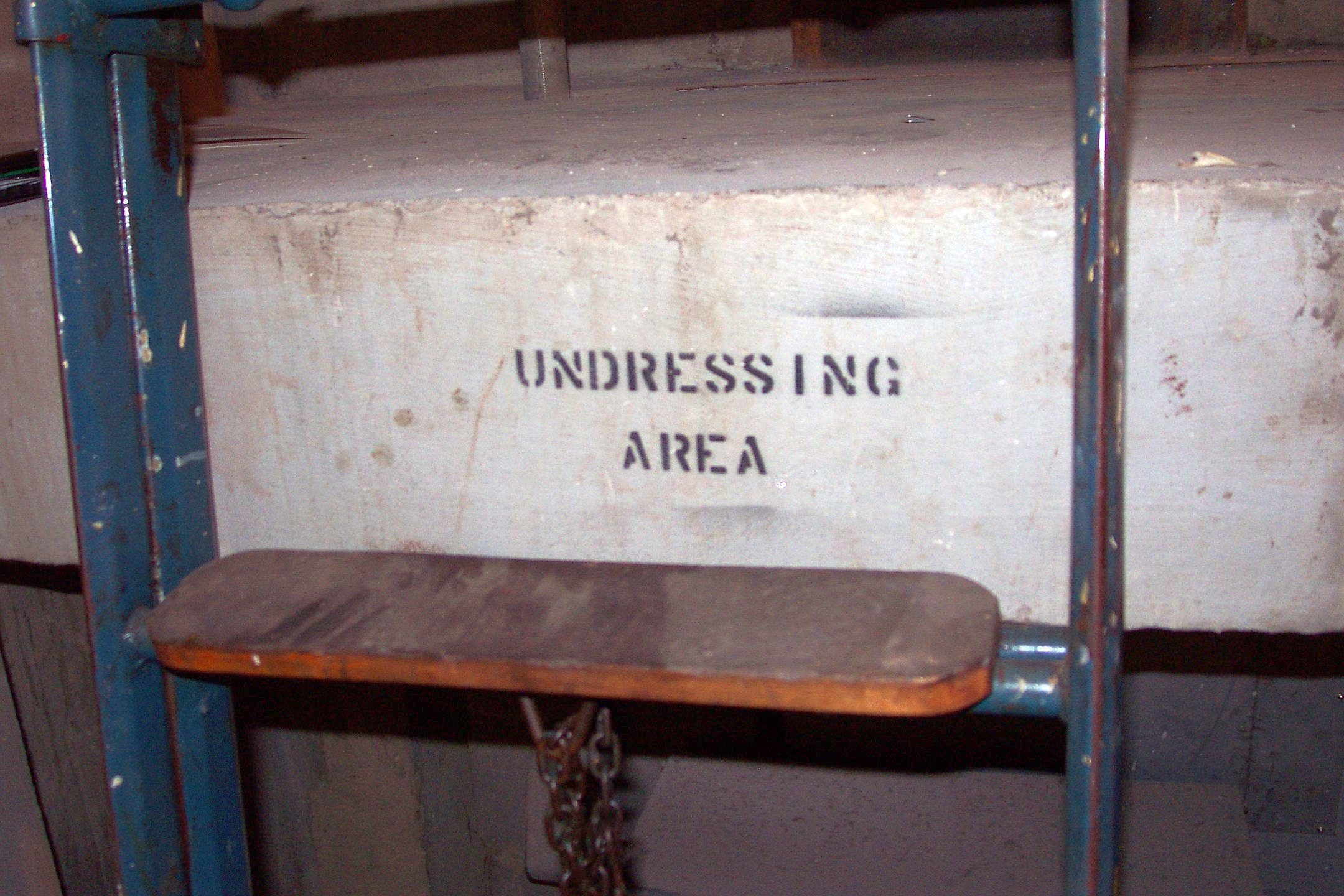
Decontamination centre beneith office building

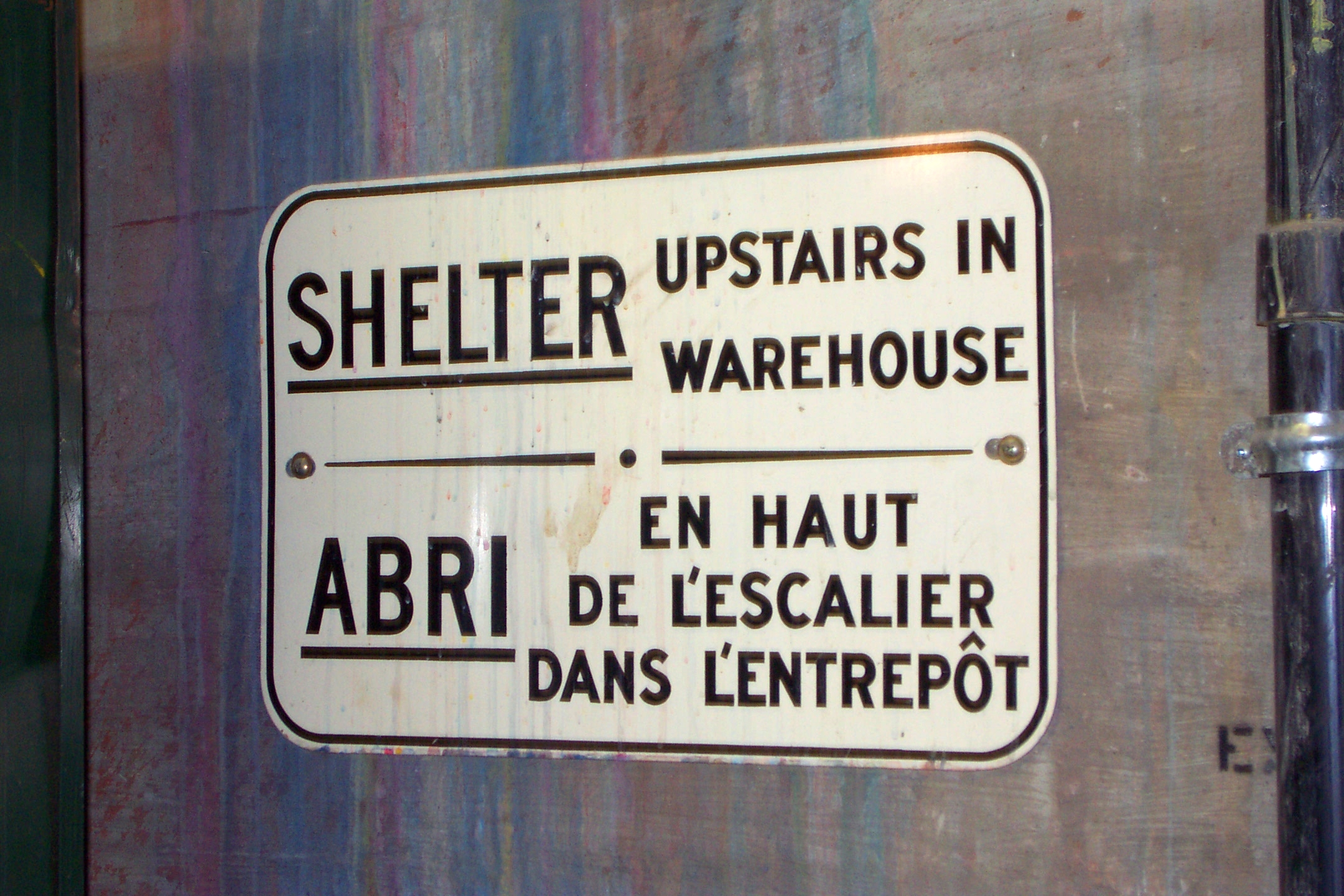
Shower and dressing area

== Today ==
The Supply Depot is used as a farmer's market and movie studio. Doors Open Toronto tours have also been conducted there. Since mid-2011, Toronto Roller Derby has played its home games in the south end of the building, known as The Bunker, including hosting the inaugural Roller Derby World Cup in 2011.
