= Gray City Rebels =

- Metro area: São Paulo
- Country: Brazil
- Founded: 2010
- Track type(s): Flat
- Venue: Ibirapuera Park
- Affiliations: WFTDA
- Website: www.graycityrebels.com.br

The Gray City Rebels (GCR) is a women's flat track roller derby league based in São Paulo, Brazil. Founded in 2010, the league consists of a single travel team, which competes against teams from other leagues, and is a member of the Women's Flat Track Derby Association (WFTDA).

== History ==
The league was founded in December 2010 as Sao Paulo's second flat track roller derby league. Four skaters from the league competed for Roller Derby Brasil at the 2011 Roller Derby World Cup.

By mid-2012, Gray City Rebels had about thirty skaters, and had brought experienced skaters from the United States to run training camps. In January 2013, it was accepted as a member of the Women's Flat Track Derby Association Apprentice Program. Gray City became a full member of the WFTDA in January 2016.
