= Roller Derby France =

- Founded: 2011
- Colors: Blue, white and red
- Head coach: Amelia Scareheart
- Championships: 7th place at 2011 Roller Derby World Cup
- Broadcasters: Derby News Network
- Website: www.rollerderbyfrance.fr

Roller Derby France represents France in women's international roller derby, in events such as the Roller Derby World Cup. The team was first formed to compete at the 2011 Roller Derby World Cup, and finished the tournament in seventh place.

Head coach Amelia Scareheart stated that the team's aim was to gain experience to strengthen itself for future contests. The team brought around a dozen supporters to the World Cup in Toronto.

France won their first round bout against Team Brazil, by 212 points to 138, but lost to Team England by 383 to 14 in the quarter-final. In the placement round, they beat Team New Zealand 180 to 129, to finish in seventh place.

== Team roster ==
=== 2011 team roster ===
The initial roster was selected from about forty applicants by the coaching staff of the team: Amelia Scareheart, Bravehurt, Dixie Pixie and Slash Gordon. (league affiliations listed as of at the time of the announcement)

Number	Name	League
5	Bambu Sengoku	Roller Derby Toulouse
699	Belle Zebuth	Les Petites Morts de Bordeaux
118	Bestia Loca	Roller Derby Toulouse
75	Bloody Vuitton	Paris Rollergirls
66	Bone E. Vicious	Paris Rollergirls
3	Butch Shan	Paris Rollergirls
51	Cash Pistache	Roller Derby Toulouse
42	Chakk Attack	Roller Derby Toulouse
138	Cherry LieLie	Paris Rollergirls
8	Dual Hitizen	D.C. Rollergirls
18	Emi Wild	Les Petites Morts de Bordeaux
24	Francey Pants	Montreal Roller Derby
11	Karla Karschër	Les Petites Morts de Bordeaux
182	Katy Fury	Paris Rollergirls
B612	Kozmic Bruise	Paris Rollergirls
666	Maggie Yo Teen	Roller Derby Toulouse
00	Meryl Strip-her	Paris Rollergirls
17	Router Girl	Pioneer Valley Roller Derby
HK13	Truck Off Pooky	Paris Rollergirls
218	Whisky Mamy	Paris Rollergirls
