= Oil City Roller Derby =

Roller derby league

- Metro area: Edmonton, Alberta
- Country: Canada
- Founded: 2005
- Teams: Oil City Derby Girls (Travel Team); GI Janes (house team); Dirty Harriets (house team); River City Riot (Men's Team); Space Oddities (co-ed house team); Near Death Stars (co-ed house team)
- Track type: Flat
- Venue: Edmonton Sportsdome
- Website: www.ocrd.ca

Oil City Roller Derby (formerly called Oil City Derby Girls) is a flat track roller derby league based in Edmonton, Alberta, Canada. Founded in 2005, the league currently consists of six teams, comprising men's, women's and co-ed squads.

== Teams ==
- 6 House teams:
  1. Damage Inc - Coed, low-contact
  2. Dirty Harriets - Female, full-contact
  3. G.I. Janes - Female, full-contact
  4. Near Death Stars - Coed, full-contact
  5. River City Riot - Male, full contact
  6. Space Oddities - Coed, full-contact
- 2 Travel teams:
  1. Oil City Derby Girls - Female, full contact
  2. Dreadnaughts/Riot - Male, full contact

House teams are composed of travel team skaters as well as those who are not part of the travel team. These teams play B-level teams and other house teams. Travel teams are more competitive and play higher level teams. These teams tend to travel more frequently and farther. The Dreadnaughts are a registered MRDA team.

== History ==
The league was founded in 2005, and claims to have been the first flat-track roller derby league in Canada. By the following February, it had 14 skaters, and was known as the "Oil City Rollers." Although it briefly planned to expand across Canada, other leagues emerged in other cities, and E-Ville Roller Derby split from Oil City to produce two leagues in the city.

In January 2009, Lesley McDonald, a skater with Oil City, founded the Canadian Women's Roller Derby Association, By September 2010, the league was hosting bouts in a 3,000-capacity venue. It won the Wild Rose Cup from the Calgary Roller Derby Association, which had held it for three years.

Teeknee, a member of Oil City at the time, was selected to play for Team Canada at the 2011 Roller Derby World Cup.

In 2015, the league turned 10 years old. It was at this time that they chose to re-brand the league as "Oil City Roller Derby", to better embody the inclusive and non-gendered nature of the league. The league reserved the Oil City Derby Girls name for their travel team to honour the history of the league.

In 2015, Oil City Roller Derby moved to the Edmonton Sportsdome due to the demolition of Metro Sportsplex.

== See also ==
- Oil City (Alberta)
