= Hogtown Roller Derby =

Women's flat track roller derby league

- Metro area: Toronto, Ontario
- Country: Canada
- Founded: 2007
- Teams: Horror (A team); Debu-Taunts (B team)
- Track type: Flat
- Venue: Ted Reeve Arena
- Affiliations: WFTDA
- Website: www.hogtownrollerderby.com

Hogtown Roller Derby, founded as the Greater Toronto Area Rollergirls (GTAR), is a women's flat track roller derby league based in Toronto, Ontario. Founded in 2007, Hogtown Roller Derby is a member of the Women's Flat Track Derby Association (WFTDA).

== History ==
The league was founded as Greater Toronto Area Rollergirls in early 2007 by Cynthia Brooks, known as "Splat Benatar" as Toronto's first not-for-profit roller derby league. In 2009, its skaters included a nanny, an insurance broker and an actress. The league consists of two teams, which compete against teams from other leagues.

By 2011, GTAR was one of three roller derby leagues in Toronto. In July, it was accepted as an apprentice member of the Women's Flat Track Derby Association.

Several skaters from GTAR were involved in the 2011 Roller Derby World Cup, which was hosted by Toronto Roller Derby. Three then-league members took part: Canadian Psycho was selected to skate for All-Ireland Roller Derby and Sloppy Boggins was chosen as assistant coach for Team Sweden, while Lee Way Wreck'em was an alternate for Team Canada.

On December 23, 2013, GTAR was made a full WFTDA member league.

In May 2018, the league announced a rebrand as Hogtown Roller Derby, borrowing on the nickname "Hogtown" for Toronto.

== WFTDA rankings ==
Former GTAR logo

Season	Final ranking	Playoffs	Championship
2014	193 WFTDA	DNQ	DNQ
2015	216 WFTDA	DNQ	DNQ
2016	261 WFTDA	DNQ	DNQ
2017	300 WFTDA	DNQ	DNQ
2018	332 WFTDA	DNQ	DNQ
