= Toronto Roller Derby =

Roller derby league

- Metro area: Toronto, Ontario
- Country: Canada
- Founded: 2006
- Teams: All-Stars (travel team); The Toxins (home team)
- Track type: Flat
- Venue: George Bell Arena (2007-2009); The Hangar (2009-2011); The Bunker (2011-2018)
- Affiliations: WFTDA
- Org. type: Skater Owned
- Website: http://torontorollerderby.com

Toronto Roller Derby (ToRD), is a women's flat-track roller derby league in Toronto, Ontario, Canada. Formed in 2006, the league started play in 2007, and held its tenth season in 2016. Operated and managed by its skaters and members, ToRD has four house teams, one rookie travel team, and one WFTDA charter travel team. Since 2011, the league has operated out of a space in Downsview Park, but announced in January 2015 that they were in search of a new home. They moved to another space near Downsview Park from 2015 - 2020. When the pandemic hit they lost the venue, and postponed practices until 2022. Since then they have moved to a new venue. After the pandemic the team's Chicks Ahoy!, Gore-Gore Roller Girls, Death Track Dolls and The Smoke City Bandits have been disbanded and the teams that remain are The All Stars and The Toxins (formerly known as the Vipers).

The house league season runs in the spring and summer, with events for ToRD's all-star travel team scheduled year round. Toronto Roller Derby is a member of the Women's Flat Track Derby Association, having gained membership in June 2011. In December 2011 ToRD served as host of the inaugural Roller Derby World Cup.

== League history and structure ==
league logo 2006-15

In 2006, two separate organizations, the Toronto Terrors and the Smoke City Betties, formed independently with the goal of launching roller derby in Toronto, and after taking part in an event known as "Betties D Day" that August, joined forces to create Toronto Roller Derby.

As of the 2018 season, Toronto Roller Derby has an all-star travel team, a rookie team, and a four-team house league. Until midway through the 2018 season, home events were held at The Bunker (also known as "Studio 3"), a former Canadian Armed Forces supply depot, located in Downsview Park:. After losing access to the Bunker space in 2018, while ToRD continues to practice at Downsview Park, the new space is not suitable for hosting public games, leaving the league seeking alternative options for events.

=== Home teams ===
The Chicks Ahoy! feature bright green uniforms with a sailor theme. "The Chicks" appeared in the league final five out of the league's first six years, and were the league champion in 2008, 2011, 2012, 2016 and 2017.

The Death Track Dolls uniforms are white jerseys with red "blood splatter" accents. "The Dolls" won their first league championship in 2013.

The Gore-Gore Rollergirls wear distinctive leopard-print outfits. The only team to have appeared in all of the first six championship bouts, "The Gores" were the winners of the league's first final in 2007 and were the first league team to capture back to back titles, winning in 2009 and 2010. As of 2018, the Gores have appeared in all but two league championships, and won the league championship in 2018.

The Hangar, former venue for Toronto Roller Derby.

Originally known as the Smoke City Betties, the Smoke City Bandits wear black and blue uniforms and were runner up in the 2009 and 2013 league finals, and in 2015 won their first championship. In December 2016, the league announced that the team had rebranded as the Smoke City Bandits.

=== League championship history ===
At the end of every season, Toronto Roller Derby holds playoff bouts, with the two finalists playing for the league championship trophy, known as The Boot.

Season	Champion	Runner up	Final score	Venue
2007	Gore-Gore Rollergirls	Chicks Ahoy!	89–53	Rinx
2008	Chicks Ahoy!	Gore-Gore Rollergirls	114–97	George Bell Arena
2009	Gore-Gore Rollergirls	Smoke City Betties	129–88	The Hangar
2010	Gore-Gore Rollergirls	Chicks Ahoy!	107–31	The Hangar
2011	Chicks Ahoy!	Gore-Gore Rollergirls	111–46	The Hangar
2012	Chicks Ahoy!	Gore-Gore Rollergirls	196–56	The Bunker
2013	Death Track Dolls	Smoke City Betties	258–73	The Bunker
2014	Death Track Dolls	Gore-Gore Rollergirls	184-139	The Bunker
2015	Smoke City Betties	Gore-Gore Rollergirls	171-140	The Bunker
2016	Chicks Ahoy!	Gore-Gore Rollergirls	164-88	The Bunker
2017	Chicks Ahoy!	Death Track Dolls	190-123	The Bunker
2018	Gore-Gore Rollergirls	Smoke City Bandits	143-139	Ted Reeve Arena
2019	Gore-Gore Rollergirls	Death Track Dolls	288-102	Ted Reeve Arena

== Travel teams ==
=== Toronto Roller Derby All-Stars ===
Former CN Power team logo

Toronto Roller Derby's charter travel team, formerly named CN Power (playing on the name of the CN Tower, a Toronto landmark) is the Toronto Roller Derby All-Stars. Every year, league members, including transfer skaters who have yet to be drafted to a home team, participate in tryouts, the results of which are used to select the All-Stars' roster. The team colours are pink, silver and white, and it plays home and away games against teams from other cities' leagues. Toronto was originally placed in WFTDA's North Central region, and after the introduction of the Divisions system debuted in Division 2 at 49th overall. By the end of 2013, Toronto had advanced 20 slots to 29th overall, and competed as a Division 1 team beginning in 2014.

==== WFTDA competition ====
CN Power, initially representing Toronto in the WFTDA's North Central Region, received their first ranking at the conclusion of the 2011 WFTDA season, and debuted at 17th in the region. At the conclusion of the first quarter of 2012, this ranking had improved to 15th, and after the second quarter, another improvement, to 13th. In 2013, the WFTDA did away with regional rankings, and changed to ranking all member leagues from top to bottom; as of April 2013, Toronto was ranked 49th out of 155 ranked teams overall. In July 2013, it was announced that Toronto had moved 10 spots up in the rankings, to 39th overall, qualifying them for their first appearance in the WFTDA Division 1 playoffs, held in September 2013 in Salem, Oregon. On the first day of the tournament, Toronto, seeded tenth in the tournament, upset the seventh-seeded Sacred City Derby Girls in their first bout of the weekend, 215–90. This set up a bout versus the second-seeded Atlanta Rollergirls, who defeated Toronto 219–171. On the Saturday, CN Power upset the sixth-seeded Boston Derby Dames, narrowly defeating them 204-198, and qualified for the bout to determine fifth place on the Sunday, where they fell 208-124 to the All Stars from the Victorian Roller Derby League, ending the tournament with a sixth-place finish. As of March 31, 2014, Toronto was ranked 13th in the WFTDA, making Toronto the highest-ranked team in Canada for the first time.

In 2014, CN Power qualified for the WFTDA playoffs for the second time, with an overall ranking of 23, earning them an appearance at their second consecutive Division 1 playoff tournament, held September 19–21 in Evansville, Indiana. Toronto entered the tournament as the sixth seed, and played their first game of the tournament against the Windy City Rollers of Chicago, losing 327-80, relegating them to the consolation bracket. Toronto then defeated the All Stars of Houston Roller Derby 220-140, lost to Arizona Roller Derby 167-137 and defeated Steel City Roller Derby of Pittsburgh, 184-170, to finish the tournament in seventh place.

In 2015, CN Power again qualified for the WFTDA Division 1 playoffs, entering as the eighth seed in Omaha, Nebraska, and lost all three of their games to end the tournament in tenth place.

After missing the WFTDA post-season in 2016 and 2017, in 2018, Toronto was ranked 59th overall in the June 30 rankings update, and received an invitation to a Continental Cup, but declined their invitation.

==== Rankings ====
Season	Final ranking	Playoffs	Championship
2011	17 NC	DNQ	DNQ
2012	14 NC	DNQ	DNQ
2013	29 WFTDA	6 D1	DNQ
2014	28 WFTDA	7 D1	DNQ
2015	41 WFTDA	10 D1	DNQ
2016	102 WFTDA	DNQ	DNQ
2017	88 WFTDA	DNQ	DNQ
2018	58 WFTDA	DNP CC NA East	DNQ

- DNP = did not play

==== Quad City Chaos ====
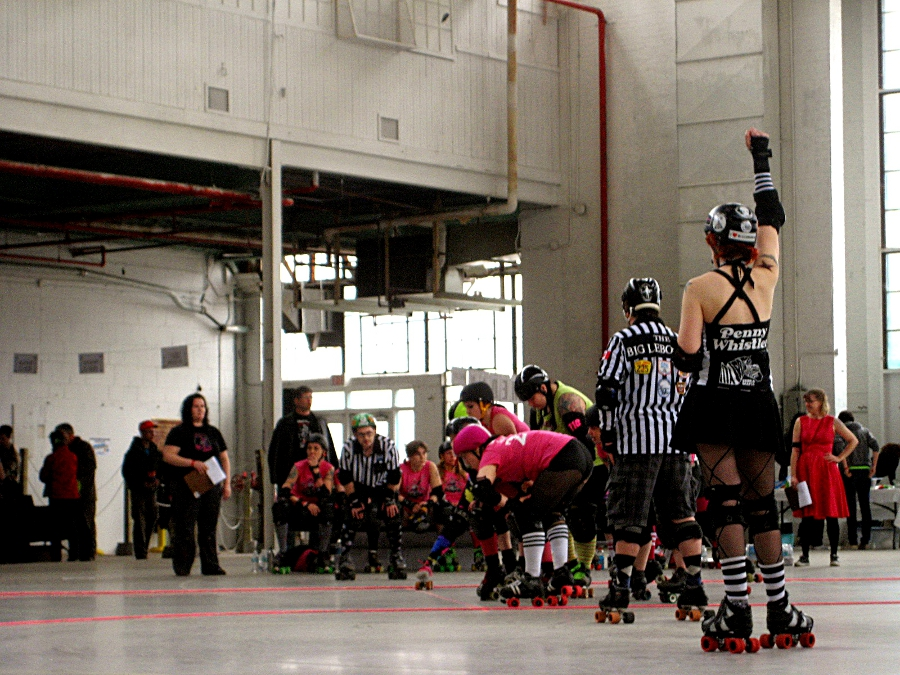
Montreal's New Skids On The Block vs CN Power, Quad City Chaos Tournament, March 28, 2010

From 2010 through 2015, Toronto Roller Derby hosted an invitational tournament called Quad City Chaos each March, bringing in three WFTDA Division 1 leagues' A teams to play the All-Stars, along with B teams. In 2015 the leagues were the Boston Derby Dames, Steel City Roller Derby from Pittsburgh and the Rideau Valley Roller Girls from Ottawa.

=== Bay Street Bruisers ===
The Bay Street Bruisers were one of the original six home teams when the league started play in 2007, but disbanded in early 2009 along with the original D-VAS. In 2011 the Bruisers name was resurrected for a "B team", to be a secondary travel squad in addition to CN Power. In October 2011, it was announced that they intended to start game play in 2012. The Bruisers uniforms are navy blue and gold, and feature a necktie detail, referencing their namesake in Toronto's financial district, Bay Street. On May 20, 2012, The Bruisers played their first interleague bout against the Ohio Roller Girls' B-team, Gang Green, bowing to the Ohio team, 163–109. In July 2012, the Bruisers competed at the Roller Derby Association of Canada's Eastern Region Championship tournament, held in Guelph, Ontario, and finished the tournament in first place, defeating the All Stars from Forest City Derby Girls (London, Ontario) in the final, 163–88. The Bruisers' roster is determined using the same tryout process that determines the CN Power roster.

=== Vipers ===
Two teams from the original group of six in 2007 disbanded before the start of the 2009 season. The D-VAS and Bay Street Bruisers both folded in the Spring of that year, with their skaters dispersed to the remaining four league teams. The D-VAS (pronounced diva, and short for Deadly Viper Assassination Squad), were relaunched in 2010 as the league's rookie squad, composed of newer and transfer skaters who have yet to be drafted onto the other four league teams, and they skate against other leagues' emerging talent.

In 2011, the D-VAS split two bouts against Nickel City Roller Derby's Sister Slag squad, with the D-VAS winning the first bout in Toronto 71 to 38, and Nickel City hosting the follow-up bout in June in Sudbury, and taking the win 157 to 36. In July 2011, the D-VAS took second place in the 2 Fresh 2 Furious rookie tournament hosted by the GTA Rollergirls. In September 2011, the D-VAS faced off against Guelph's Royal City Roller Girls All-Stars, with Guelph winning, 203 to 42. They wear black and red.

In November 2016, the D-VAS officially changed their team name to the Vipers.

== ToRD in the media ==
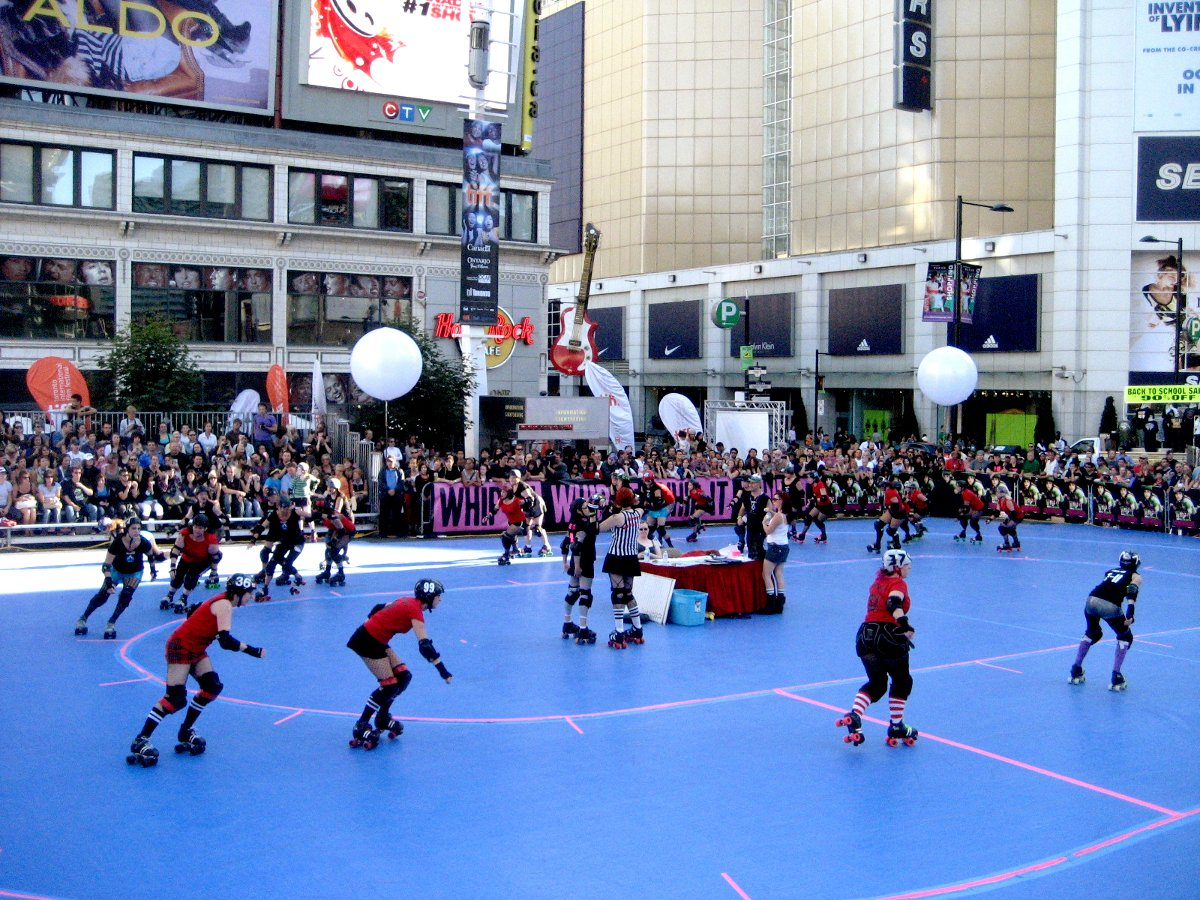
Toronto Roller Derby skaters play an exhibition bout at the Toronto International Film Festival premiere of Whip It, September 13, 2009

=== Whip It promotion ===
During the 2009 Toronto International Film Festival, Drew Barrymore's film Whip It had its North American premiere. To help promote the film, Toronto Roller Derby skaters wore "Hurl Scouts" uniforms from the movie, while others from the league held a public exhibition bout at Yonge-Dundas Square (now Sankofa Square), an event which was attended by the stars of the film at halftime, giving Toronto Roller Derby their largest media exposure to date. ToRD's luck in securing the premiere, the legacy of the film festival event, and the film itself, have contributed to larger crowds and greater numbers of women trying out for the league.

=== Rogers TV ===
Since 2010, Rogers TV in Toronto has been airing playoff games from the Toronto Roller Derby house league season, beginning with the Championship Bout from November 2010, which was the first time a complete ToRD event was broadcast on local television. Starting in 2011, Rogers property CITY-TV has been providing regular news coverage on CityNews, provided by sports anchor Kathryn Humphreys, as well as Hugh Burrill.

=== Political Lobbying ===
In 2011 the league was recognized for lobbying at meetings in East York and North York to protest proposed cuts to the 101 Downsview Park bus, which was the only bus line that serviced the area for the league's arena.

== Roller Derby World Cup ==
It was announced in early 2011 that Toronto Roller Derby was chosen to host the inaugural Roller Derby World Cup. In early December 2011 the event saw teams representing 13 countries in a four-day tournament held at The Bunker at Downsview Park. League member Brim Stone, captain of both the Gore-Gore Rollergirls as well as CN Power, was named to Team Canada for the event, and was also named co-captain for the team. The event was won by Team USA who defeated Team Canada in the final.

On December 29, 2013, five members of Toronto Roller Derby were announced as having made the 2014 Team Canada roster for the 2014 Roller Derby World Cup, to be held in Dallas, Texas: Bala Reina, Dusty, Dyna Hurtcha, Nasher the Smasher and Rainbow Fight. All five skaters were members of CN Power.

Members of Toronto Roller Derby participated in the 2018 Roller Derby World Cup for a variety of teams: Santa Muerte (skating as "Pinoy Noir") for Team Philippines, Bethany "Boxcar" Fisher for Team Canada, and DaSilva and Pikante for Team Portugal.

== See also ==
- Roller derby
- History of roller derby
- List of roller derby leagues
