= Team Canada (roller derby) =

National sports team

- Founded: 2011
- Colours: Red, white and black
- Head coach: Jessica 'Bandit' Paternostro (head coach); Bryan "Flyin Bryan Killman" McWilliam (assistant coach); Ian "Johnny Qwadd" Verchere (strength & conditioning coach)
- Manager: Alyssa "Georgia W. Tush" Kwasny (Business Manager); Fawn Hall (team manager); Germaine "P1" Koh (Chef de Mission)
- Championships: 2nd place – 2011 Roller Derby World Cup; 4th place – 2014 Roller Derby World Cup; 3rd place – 2018 Roller Derby World Cup
- Broadcasters: Derby News Network (2011)
- Website: http://www.teamcanadarollerderby.com/

Team Canada represents Canada in women's international roller derby. The current team was first formed to compete at the 2011 Roller Derby World Cup, and finished the tournament in second place to Team USA, losing the final 336 points to 33. Team Canada has finished in the top four at each Roller Derby World Cup thus far.

A previous Team Canada toured England and Scotland in June 2008. Skaters from the Calgary Roller Derby Association, Oil City Derby Girls, Saskatoon Roller Derby, Terminal City Roller Girls and Toronto Roller Derby played bouts against the Birmingham Blitz Dames, Glasgow Roller Girls and London Rollergirls.

== 2018 team ==
Tryouts for the team that would compete at the 2018 Roller Derby World Cup were held in October 2016 in Rockland, Ontario and Calgary. The resulting roster was then announced in November 2016, at the time referred to as the "2017 roster", as the third world cup was at the time expected to be held in late 2017. This initial training roster comprised 28 skaters, plus six additional "developmental" skaters, who would have the opportunity to train with the rest of the team, encouraging growth.

=== 2018 team roster ===
(league affiliations as of the time of the announcement)

Number	Name	Derby name	League
11	Allie Artuso (Note: Team Canada Development Program Athlete, as announced in November 2016 release)		Royal City Roller Girls
88	Azure Benesh	Maiden Sane	Terminal City Rollergirls
1017	Alicia Biggley	Biggley Smallz	Montreal Roller Derby
33	Serenity Caldwell	Artoo Detoonate	Providence Roller Derby (Note: Skater was affiliated with Providence when the roster was released in November 2016, subsequently transferring to Montreal Roller Derby)
9999	Lorianne Dicaire	Mange Moi el Cul	Montreal Roller Derby
604	Sara Ekholm		Helsinki Roller Derby
131	Alexandra Evans		Terminal City Rollergirls
210	Bethany Fisher	Boxcar	Toronto Roller Derby
238	Abigail Garratt	Preacher's Slaughter	Calgary Roller Derby Association
66	Yuna Guivarc’h	Falcon Punch	Montreal Roller Derby
84	Karlene Harvey	Buffy Sainte Fury	Terminal City Rollergirls
989	Sarah Hipel		Detroit Derby Girls
231	Erin Hudson	Crazy Squirrel	Tri-City Roller Derby (Note: Skater was affiliated with Tri-City when the roster was released in November 2016, subsequently transferring to Queen City Roller Girls)
658	Allison Hughes	Surgical Strike	Montreal Roller Derby
	Jocelyn Ingram	Sundown	Terminal City Rollergirls
19	Renée Labrosse		Capital City Derby Dolls (Note: Skater was affiliated with Capital City when the roster was released in November 2016, subsequently transferring to Montreal Roller Derby)
95	Marilyne Lamontagne	Pouliche	Montreal Roller Derby
183	Abby Lever		Calgary Roller Derby Association
1116	Kristine McGillivary	Kris Myass	Calgary Roller Derby Association
123	Claudia Maréchal	Miracle Whips	Montreal Roller Derby
289	Tracey Mattinson	Cheese Grater	Montreal Roller Derby
306	Kylie Morin		Terminal City Rollergirls
333	Mai Nguyen	So-Viet	Roller Derby Québec
303	Midori Ohtake	KonichiWOW	Montreal Roller Derby (Note: Skater was affiliated with Montreal when the roster was released in November 2016, subsequently transferring to Queen City Roller Girls)
16	Brittany Palmer		Terminal City Rollergirls
24	Paige Parsons	Shania Pain	E-Ville Roller Derby
420	Melissa Perreault	Mel-e Juana	Montreal Roller Derby
616	Ashley Ronson	Watcher Ash	Capital City Derby Dolls
13	Sophie Royer	Al K. Traz	Montreal Roller Derby
76	Kelsey Sanders	Frank the Tank	Terminal City Rollergirls
1349	Taran Spies	Razor	Calgary Roller Derby Association
47	Carla Smith	Scarlett Bloodbath	Terminal City Rollergirls
1111	Kassandra Sundt	Maya Mangleyou	Boston Roller Derby
1107	Natt Young	Scar2-BeatU	Winnipeg Roller Derby League

=== 2018 coaching staff ===
The coaching staff for this edition was announced in July 2016.

- Head coach – Jessica "Bandit" Paternostro – Montreal Roller Derby
- Assistant coach – Bryan "Flyin' Bryan Killman" McWilliam – Toronto Roller Derby
- Strength and conditioning Coach – Ian "Johnny Qwadd" Verchere – Terminal City Rollergirls
- Team Manager – Fawn Hall – Mainland Misfits
- Business Manager – Alyssa "Georgia W. Tush" Kwasny – Montreal Roller Derby
- Chef de Mission – Germaine "P1" Koh – Terminal City Rollergirls

=== 2018 Roller Derby World Cup ===
At the 2018 World Cup in Manchester, Team Canada claimed the bronze medal, with a 173–147 victory over Team England.

== 2014 team ==
A series of tryouts was announced for late 2013 to select the 2014 roster: 23 November in Saskatoon, Saskatchewan hosted by Saskatoon Roller Derby, 30 November in New Hamburg, Ontario hosted by Tri-City Roller Girls and 7 December in Chilliwack, British Columbia hosted by NWO Roller Girls. Over 150 skaters registered to tryout for Team Canada, with roughly half of them expected at the New Hamburg tryouts.

=== 2014 team roster ===
The 2014 roster was released on 29 December 2013. (league affiliations as of the time of the announcement)

Number	Name	League
905	Bala Reina	Toronto Roller Derby
84	Buffy Sainte Fury	Terminal City Rollergirls
454	Chasing Amy	Montreal Roller Derby
33	Demanda Lashing	Montreal Roller Derby
02	Dusty	Toronto Roller Derby
21	Dyna Hurtcha	Toronto Roller Derby
52	Evada Peron	Terminal City Rollergirls
31	Eve Hallows	Terminal City Rollergirls
40	Georgia W. Tush	Montreal Roller Derby
8080	Greta Bobo	Montreal Roller Derby
527	Heavy Flo	Philly Roller Derby
-8	Jess "Bandit" Paternostro	Montreal Roller Derby
1223	Kim Janna	Terminal City Rollergirls
303	KonichiWOW	Windy City Rollers
1116	Kriss Myass	Calgary Roller Derby Association
2	Lil' Mama	Montreal Roller Derby
44	Luludemon	Terminal City Rollergirls
18	Mackenzie	Terminal City Rollergirls
1111	Maya Mangleyou	Boston Derby Dames
420	Mel-e-Juana	Montreal Roller Derby
10	Murphy	Rideau Valley Roller Girls
2x4	Nasher the Smasher	Toronto Roller Derby
504	Nattie Long Legs	Atlanta Rollergirls
C3P0	Rainbow Fight	Toronto Roller Derby
989	Sarah Hipel	Texas Rollergirls
3X	Smack Daddy	Montreal Roller Derby
55	Soul Rekker	Rideau Valley Roller Girls
658	Surgical Strike	Montreal Roller Derby
29	Taz	Red Deer Roller Derby Association
999	USS DentHerPrize	Detroit Derby Girls

=== 2014 coaching staff ===
In late 2013, the coaching staff for Team Canada at the 2014 Roller Derby World Cup was announced:

- Head coach – Ewan Wotarmy – Montreal Roller Derby
- Assistant coach – Mack the Mouth – Terminal City Rollergirls
- Manager – Flyin' Bryan Killman – Toronto Roller Derby

=== 2014 Roller Derby World Cup ===
At the 2014 World Cup in Dallas, Team Canada finished in fourth place, losing the bronze medal match to Team Australia, 197–128.

== 2011 team ==
=== 2011 team roster ===
There are over 100 roller derby leagues in Canada, and over 100 Canadian women tried out for the team in 2011. Tryouts were held first in Toronto, Ontario at Toronto Roller Derby, then in Calgary, Alberta hosted by the Calgary Roller Derby Association, and lastly in Vancouver, British Columbia hosted by Reign Valley Vixens Roller Derby. The skaters being considered were placed on a shortlist, and team management announced the following twenty skaters as the inaugural roster in August 2011 (skater's home league at time of rostering in parentheses):

Number	Name	League
18	8Mean Wheeler	Terminal City Roller Girls
45	Beretta Lynch	West Kootenay Women's Roller Derby
1111	Bone Machine	Montreal Roller Derby
218	Brim Stone (co-captain)	Toronto Roller Derby
40	Georgia W Tush	Montreal Roller Derby
822	Gunpowder Gertie	Red Deer Roller Derby Association
89	Hell on Keller	E-Ville Roller Derby
516	Iron Wench	Montreal Roller Derby
-8	Jess Bandit (co-captain)	Montreal Roller Derby
187	Killson	Forest City Derby Girls
2	Lil Mama	Montreal Roller Derby
44	LuluDemon	Terminal City Roller Girls
88	Maiden Sane	Pile O' Bones Derby Club
204	Motorhead Molly	Tri-City Roller Girls
C3P0	Rainbow Fight (Note: "Rainbow Fight had to withdraw due to injury, and her spot on the roster was filled by Semi Precious.")	709 Derby Girls
10	Semi Precious	Rideau Valley Roller Girls
3X	Smack Daddy	Montreal Roller Derby
55	Soul Rekker	Rideau Valley Roller Girls
29	TAZ	Red Deer Roller Derby Association
50	Teeknee	Oil City Derby Girls
1491	Windigo	Houston Roller Derby

=== 2011 coaching staff ===
- Coach Pauly
- Furious P (Hammer City Roller Girls)
- Mack the Mouth (Terminal City Rollergirls)

=== 2011 Roller Derby World Cup ===
Team Canada's first international action took place 1 December through 4 at the premiere Roller Derby World Cup, held in Toronto, Ontario, Canada. Team Canada, one of thirteen nations competing, began group play at the tournament in Group A, along with teams representing Brazil, Sweden and France. Team Canada won all three of its group bouts, defeating France 244 to 17, Sweden 196 to 26 and Brazil 408 to 7. As a result of the Group round play, Team Canada was seeded second overall for the remainder of the tournament (to Team USA) and received a bye past the first elimination round. In their first elimination bout, Canada defeated tenth-seeded Finland 499 to 31, at that time the highest point spread yet in the tournament. Team Canada next faced third-seeded Team England in the first semi-final of day 4, winning the bout 161 to 90, but losing skater Georgia W Tush to a broken collarbone in the process. This set up Team Canada to face Team USA in the final (after Team USA defeated fourth seed Team Australia) and Team USA won by a final score of 336 to 33. In taking the silver medal, Team Canada scored more points against number one seed Team USA than all other teams at the tournament combined. At the conclusion of the tournament, Iron Wench was voted the team's Most Valuable Player, and Smack Daddy was voted the MVP of the entire tournament.
