= West Kootenay Roller Derby =

Roller derby league

West Kootenay Women's Roller Derby League
- Metro area: The Kootenays, BC
- Country: Canada
- Founded: 2009
- Teams: Kootenay Kannibelles (travel team); Babes of Brutality; Dam City Rollers; Gnarlie's Angels; Killjoys; Valley Vendettas
- Track type(s): Flat
- Venue: Castlegar Community Complex; Nelson and District Community Complex; Rossland Arena
- Affiliations: RDAC, WFTDA
- Website: www.kootenayrollerderby.com

West Kootenay Roller Derby (WKRD) is a roller derby league based in The Kootenays region of British Columbia in Canada. Co-founded in 2009 as the West Kootenay Women's Roller Derby League (WKWRDL) by Shelly "Hoar Frost" Grice-Gold, the league consists of five house teams, and an all-star travel team which competes against teams from other leagues for national standings.

The league has skaters from Castlegar, Fruitvale, Kaslo, Nakusp, Nelson, New Denver, Rossland, Salmo, Slocan City, Trail and Ymir. Different teams represent the various communities; for example, the Dam City Rollers are linked to Castlegar, the Killjoys to Nelson, and the Babes of Brutality to Salmo. By mid-2011, the two Nelson teams had a total of more than forty skaters.

Bobbi Barbarich, known as "Beretta Lynch", a skater on the Babes of Brutality team, played for Team Canada at the 2011 Roller Derby World Cup.

In early 2012, West Kootenay was a founder member of the Roller Derby Association of Canada, while in October, it was accepted into the Women's Flat Track Derby Association Apprentice Program.
