= Woodstock Roller Derby =

Roller derby league

Woodstock Roller Derby (WRD) is a women's flat-track roller derby league located in Woodstock, Ontario. WRD was started in 2011 and currently has one team called the Woodstock Warriors. The league's first public event was held in September 2012, against the Rollergettes from Toronto.
