= Paris Roller Derby =

Roller derby league

- Metro area: Paris
- Country: France
- Founded: 2010
- Teams: All Stars (A team); Quedalle (B team); San Cullotes (C team)
- Track type(s): Flat
- Venue: Université de Nanterre
- Affiliations: WFTDA
- Website: http://www.parisrollergirls.com

Paris Roller Derby is a women's flat track roller derby league based in Paris, France. Founded in February 2010, the league currently consists of a single team which competes against teams from other leagues, and is a member of the Women's Flat Track Derby Association (WFTDA).

== History ==
The league was founded by Inès Habhab, following the release of Whip It! in France (under the title Bliss). As the sport was not established in France, she was assisted by the Women's Flat Track Derby Association (WFTDA) in forming a league. In October 2010, the league was accepted as an apprentice member of the WFTDA, and it became a full member of the WFTDA in June 2013.

The league has been described as diverse, with French skaters joined by some originally from Finland, Germany, Indonesia and the United States. In May 2011, the team defeated the B-team of the German champions, Stuttgart Valley Rollergirlz.

More than half of the skaters for France at the 2011 Roller Derby World Cup were from the Paris Rollergirls.

== WFTDA competition ==
Gallery
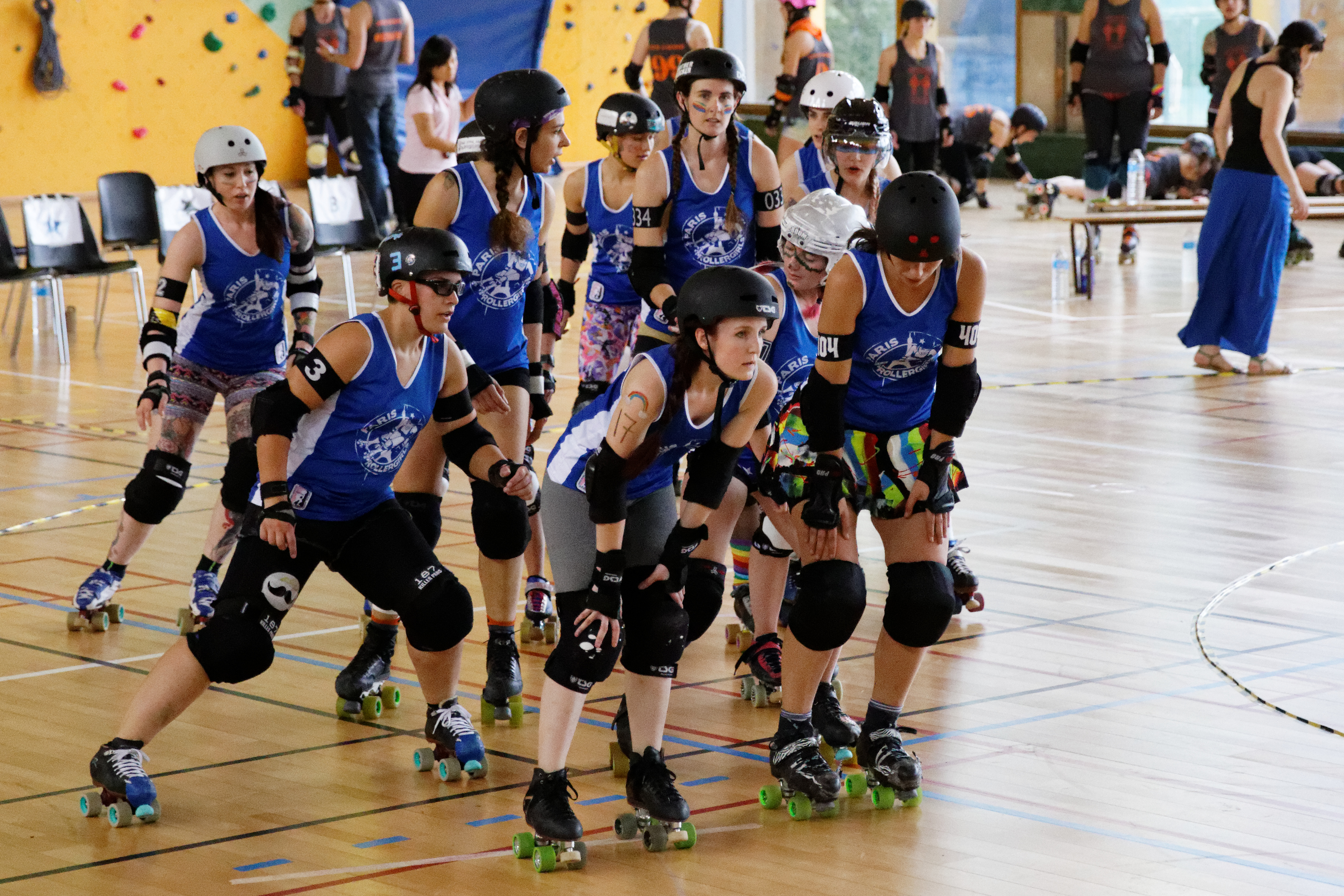

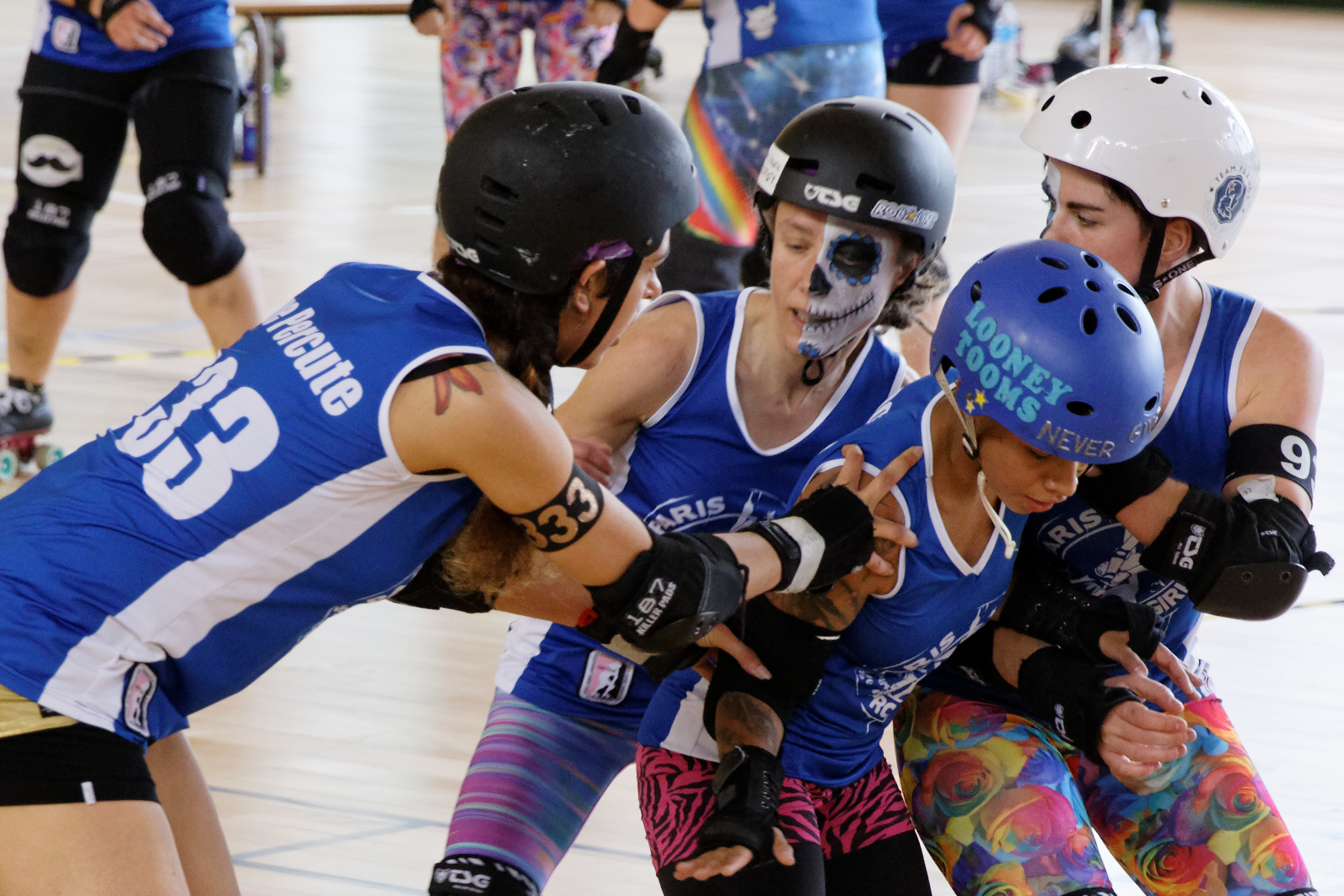

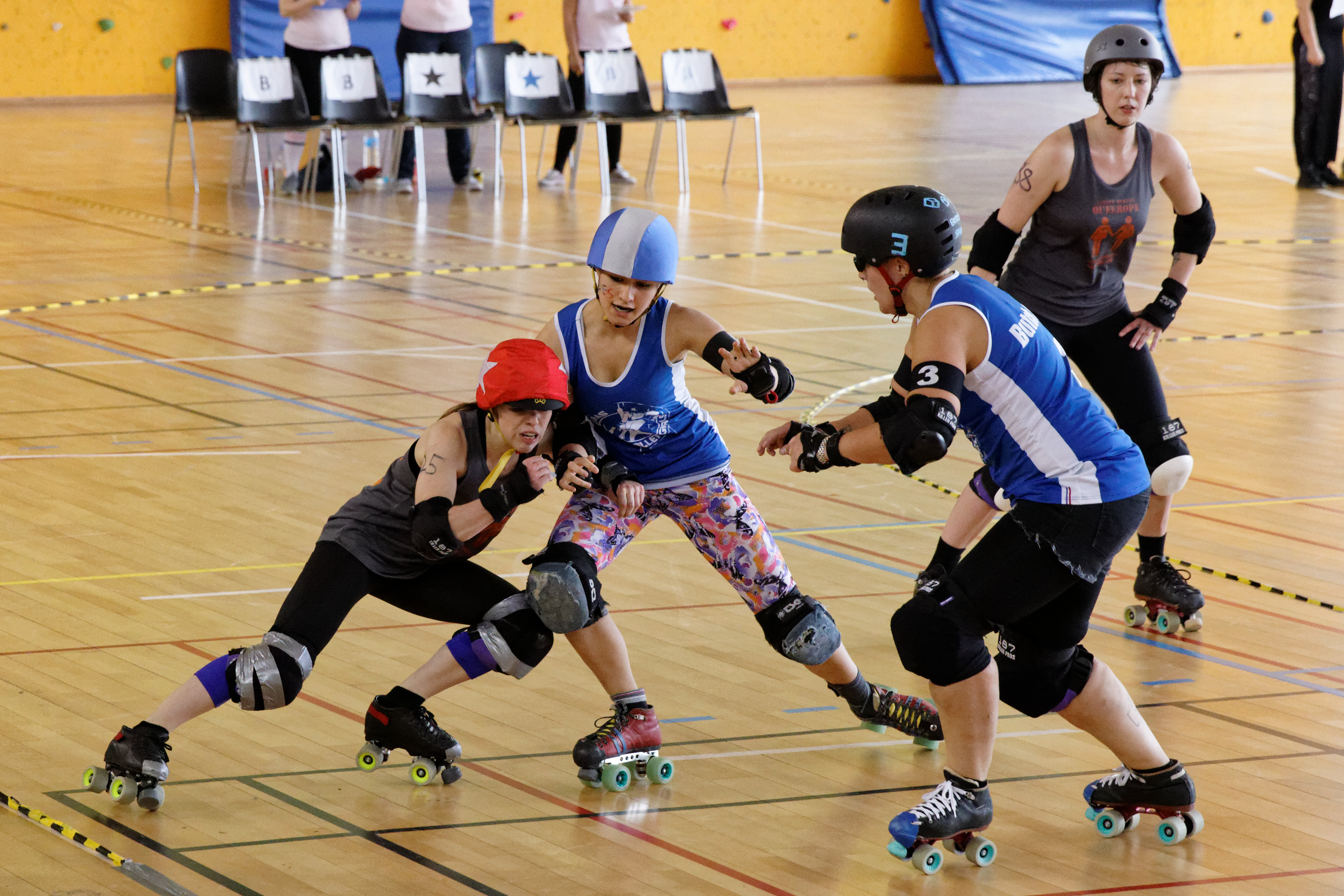

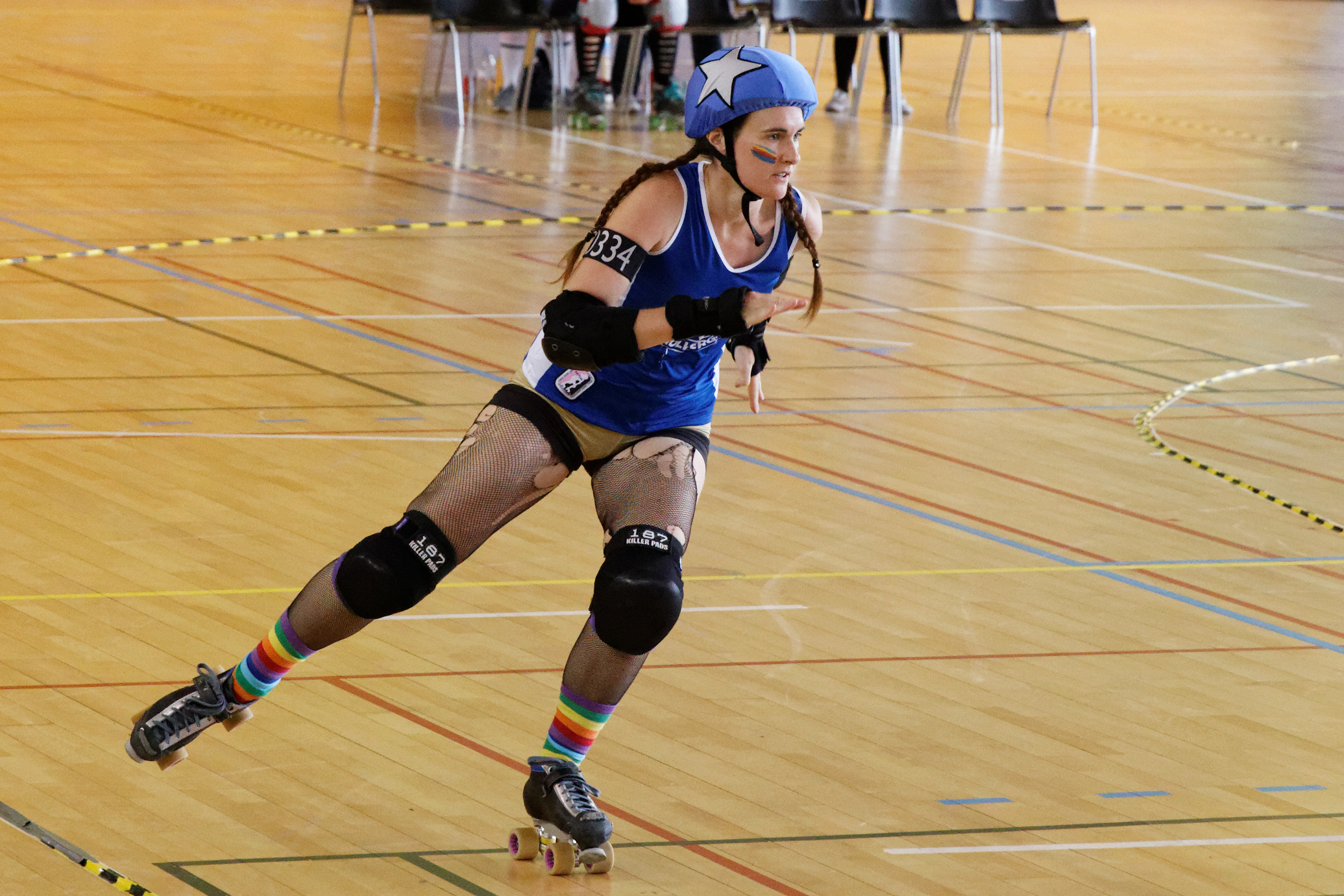

In 2017, Paris qualified for WFTDA Playoffs for the first time, entering the Division 2 Playoffs in Pittsburgh as the third seed, and winning their opening game against Bear City Roller Derby, 205–152. After defeating the Columbia Quadsquad, Paris fell to Boston Roller Derby, 198–115. Paris then defeated Dublin Roller Derby 259–152 in the semifinals, setting up a rematch against Boston in the final, which was again won by Boston, 166–150, with Paris finishing the tournament in second place.

In 2018, Paris was the eleventh seed at the WFTDA Playoff in A Coruña, Spain, but finished out of the medals after losing both of their games.

=== Rankings ===
Season	Final ranking	Playoffs	Championship
2013	NR	DNQ	DNQ
2014	169 WFTDA	DNQ	DNQ
2015	148 WFTDA	DNQ	DNQ
2016	71 WFTDA	DNQ	DNQ
2017	41 WFTDA	N/A	2 D2
2018	35 WFTDA	CR	DNQ

- CR = consolation round
