= Terminal City Roller Derby =

Roller derby league

- Metro area: Vancouver
- Country: Canada
- Founded: 2006
- Teams: Team Terminal City; Terminal City All-Stars
- Track type: Flat
- Venue: Royal City Curling Club, New Westminster, BC & Poirier Forum, Coquitlam, BC
- Affiliations: WFTDA
- Website: www.tcrd.ca

Terminal City Roller Derby (TCRD) is a flat track roller derby league was based in Vancouver. Founded in January 2006 as Terminal City Rollergirls, and TCRD is a member of the Women's Flat Track Derby Association (WFTDA).

== History and organization ==
Terminal City was founded in 2006 by Michelle "Micki Mercury" Lamoureux, who was inspired by childhood memories of watching roller derby on television and recruited initial members with a craigslist ad. By 2009, Terminal City was drawing over 1,000 fans for home events. Terminal City is the first roller derby league in the Vancouver area, became an apprentice member of the Women's Flat Track Derby Association (WFTDA) in October 2010, and a full member of the WFTDA, initially placed in the WFTDA's West Region in March 2011.

In September 2016, Terminal City hosted a 2016 International Women's Flat Track Derby Association Division 1 playoff tournament at the Richmond Olympic Oval in the Vancouver suburb of Richmond.

The league currently consists of one house team, Team Terminal City and one travel team, the Terminal City All-Stars. In 2010, Raw Meat was formed, a drop-in skating group open to all skill levels, which later became Terminal City Mix Tapes. Now, the league runs two Intro to Roller Derby programs per year. The spring 2020 program was cancelled due to the COVID-19 pandemic.

In January 2019, the league announced it was updating its name to Terminal City Roller Derby.

== WFTDA competition ==
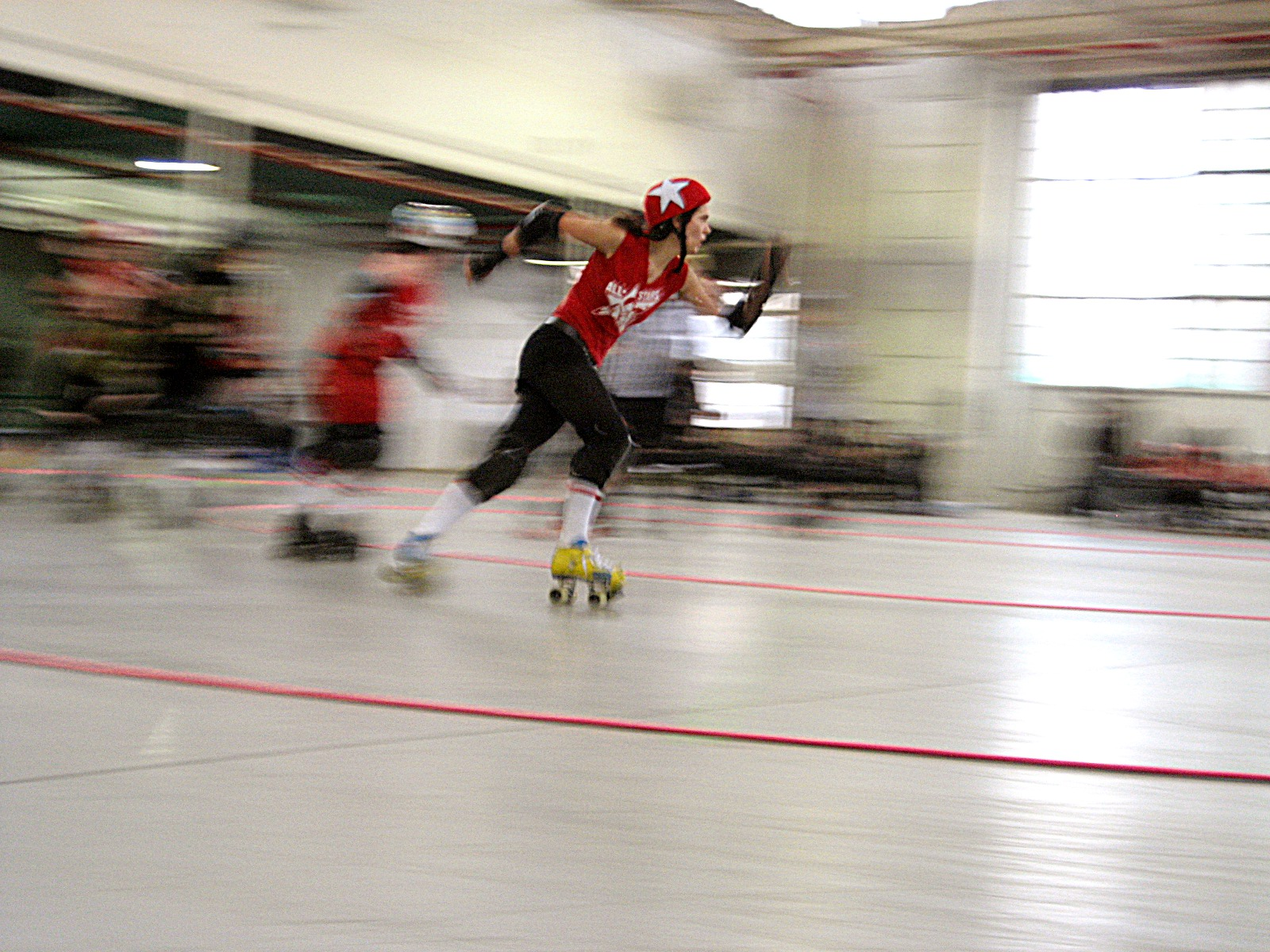
Terminal City All-Star Rollergirl, skating at Toronto Roller Derby's Quad City Chaos tournament in March 2010.

The Terminal City All-Stars represents Terminal City within the WFTDA, and is ranked by the association. In 2013, The All-Stars, at the time considered a WFTDA Division 2 team, qualified for Division 1 playoffs for the first time, entering the playoff tournament in Richmond, Virginia as the tenth seed, and finishing the tournament in seventh place. At the 2016 Division 1 tournament in Vancouver, Terminal City was the fifth seed, and finished in fifth place. In 2017, Terminal City was the tenth seed at the Malmö Division 1 Playoff, but lost 197-145 to Stockholm Roller Derby and 257-181 to Detroit Roller Derby and finished out of the medals. In 2018, Terminal City was the fourth seed at the North American West Continental Cup held in Omaha, Nebraska, and after losing their quarterfinal to Calgary Roller Derby finished the weekend with a 264-183 victory over No Coast Derby Girls in the consolation round. In 2019, the Terminal City All-Stars did not compete in WFTDA sanctioned play, and they were therefore ineligible for post-season play for the first time since 2012.

=== Rankings ===
Season	Final ranking	Playoffs	Championship
2011	23 W	DNQ	DNQ
2012	12 W	DNQ	DNQ
2013	37 WFTDA	7 D1	DNQ
2014	18 WFTDA	6 D1	DNQ
2015	24 WFTDA	5 D1	DNQ
2016	18 WFTDA	5 D1	DNQ
2017	35 WFTDA	CR D1	DNQ
2018	52 WFTDA	CR CC NA West	N/A

- CR = consolation round

== International play ==
Terminal City skaters Luludemon and 8Mean Wheeler were selected for Team Canada at the 2011 Roller Derby World Cup. 8Mean Wheeler (now skating as MacKenzie), Luludemon and four other Terminal City Skaters, Buffy Sainte Fury, Evada Peron, Eve Hallows and Kim Janna were named to the 2014 edition of Team Canada. In addition, TCRG's Mack the Mouth was named to Team Canada's coaching staff in both 2011 and 2014.
