= Ottawa Valley Roller Derby =

Roller derby league

- Metro area: Ottawa, Ontario
- Country: Canada
- Founded: 2008
- Teams: Ottawa Valley Rapids (A team); Ottawa Valley Riptides (B team); Street Cats; Valley Cats; Ottawa Junior Roller Derby (junior)
- Track type(s): Flat
- Affiliations: WFTDA
- Website: ottawavalleyrollerderby.com

Ottawa Valley Roller Derby (OVRD) is a flat track roller derby league based in Ottawa, Ontario, Canada. The league was created from a merger in 2018 between two local leagues that had been formed in 2008: Rideau Valley Roller Derby and Capital City Derby Dolls.

The originator league joined the WFTDA Apprentice Program in 2011, graduating as a full member of the Women's Flat Track Derby Association (WFTDA) in June 2012.

== History ==
In January 2018 Rideau Valley Roller Derby merged with the Capital City Derby Dolls, announcing the news and rebrand as Ottawa Valley Roller Derby on Facebook. The league consisted of eight teams: Ottawa Valley All-Stars (A); The Party Line and ByWard B (B); East Block, Centre Block and West Block (home teams; the Slaughter Squad (MRDA-aligned); and Ottawa Junior Roller Derby (Juniors).

Following the COVID-19 pandemic, the league restructured its teams to create the following: Ottawa Valley Rapids (A); Ottawa Valley Riptides (B); Street Rats and Valley Cats (house league); and Ottawa Junior Roller Derby.

== History of Original Leagues ==
=== Rideau Valley Roller Derby ===
The Bytown Blackhearts hosted their first bout in Ottawa in January 2009 against the Sexpos of Montreal Roller Derby. By June 2011, the league was known as "Rideau Valley Roller Girls" and hosted the first Canadian Women's Roller Derby Association East Tournament, losing in the final to the Forest City Derby Girls. By late 2011, Rideau Valley bouts were attracting up to and over 1,000 fans per game.

In January 2011, Rideau Valley was accepted as an apprentice member of the Women's Flat Track Derby Association.

Rideau Valley skater Soul Rekker was selected to skate for Team Canada at the 2011 Roller Derby World Cup in December 2011, and was later joined by leaguemate Semi Precious (Hanna Murphy). Murphy and Soul Rekker returned to their national team for the 2014 Roller Derby World Cup.

In April 2017, Rideau Valley rebranded as "Rideau Valley Roller Derby" to put more emphasis on the sport and to better respect its members. At the end of 2017, Rideau Valley featured the Vixens A-team and Sirens B-team, and three home teams, the Slaughter Daughters, Riot Squad and Prime Sinisters.

Original Rideau Valley logo

Final Rideau Valley logo

=== Capital City Derby Dolls ===
Formed in 2008, the league was made up of the Dolly Rogers (A), Dollinquents (B), Cupquakes, Cannon Dolls, and the Beauty School Dropouts (home teams).

Renée Labrosse (derby name The Big Labrosski) and Ashley Ronson (Watcher Ash) from the league were selected for Team Canada in 2016, for the 2018 Roller Derby World Cup roster.

Capital City Roller Derby logo

== WFTDA competition ==
Rideau Valley Roller Derby gained full membership of the WFTDA in June 2012, and were represented in WFTDA competition by their charter all-star team, the Rideau Valley Vixens. 2012 was the final year that the WFTDA used geographical regions for organizing rankings, and Rideau Valley was placed in the East Region.

In August 2014, Rideau Valley became the first team from outside the United States to take first place at a WFTDA Playoff tournament, when they defeated Bear City Roller Derby of Berlin at the Division 2 Playoff in Kitchener-Waterloo. Rideau Valley then played for the Division 2 Championship in Nashville, Tennessee on November 2, 2014, losing to the Detroit Derby Girls.

In 2015, Rideau Valley was the tenth seed at the Division 1 Playoff in Dallas, but lost their three games to Sun State Roller Girls, Stockholm Roller Derby and Ohio Roller Girls and finished in tenth place.

=== Rankings ===
Season	Final ranking	Playoffs	Championship
2012	71 WFTDA, 24 E	DNQ	DNQ
2013	68 WFTDA	DNQ	DNQ
2014	40 WFTDA	1 D2	2 D2
2015	37 WFTDA	1 D1	DNQ
2016	81 WFTDA	DNQ	DNQ
2017	72 WFTDA	DNQ	DNQ
2018	76 WFTDA	DNQ	DNQ
2019	69 WFTDA	DNQ	DNQ
2020	68 WFTDA	DNQ	DNQ
