= Royal City Roller Derby =

Roller derby league

- Metro area: Guelph, ON
- Country: Canada
- Founded: 2010
- Teams: Brute Leggers (A team); Rum Rollers (B team); Killer Queens; Violet Uprising; The Untouchables; Our Ladies of Pain (rookie team)
- Track type(s): flat
- Venue: Victoria Road Recreation Centre
- Affiliations: WFTDA
- Website: royalcityrollerderby.com

Royal City Roller Derby (RCRD) is a women's flat track roller derby league based in Guelph, Ontario. Founded in 2010, the league consists of three teams, plus two travel teams which compete against teams from other leagues. Royal City is a member of the Women's Flat Track Derby Association (WFTDA).

== History ==
Original Royal City logo by Seth

Royal City was founded as Royal City Roller Girls in April 2010, and initially trained at West End Rec Centre. By August, it had already grown to forty skaters, but was hit when its practice venue closed. Despite this, the league played its first season in 2011, contesting five bouts, and hosted the Roller Derby Association of Canada Eastern tournament in 2012.

In November 2016, it was announced that Royal City was launching a junior roller derby program in early 2017, geared towards girls between the ages of 9 and 17.

The league's logo and those of its various teams were designed by the cartoonist Seth.

In April 2018, Royal City announced on their social media pages a rebrand as Royal City Roller Derby, and would be updating their logo as well.

== WFTDA competition ==
In October 2013, Royal City was accepted as a member of the Women's Flat Track Derby Association Apprentice Program, and became a full member in December 2014. In 2018, Royal City qualified for the first WFTDA Continental Cup, the 2018 North America East edition in Kalamazoo, Michigan, at which they were the seventh seed. After losing their opening game to tenth-seeded Dub City Roller Derby 203-200, Royal City finished in the consolation round with a 239-166 loss to Grand Raggidy Roller Derby.

=== Rankings ===
Season	Final ranking	Playoffs	Championship
2015	103 WFTDA	DNQ	DNQ
2016	82 WFTDA	DNQ	DNQ
2017	61 WFTDA	DNQ	DNQ
2018	53 WFTDA	CR CC NA East	NA

- CR = consolation round
