= E-Ville Roller Derby =

Roller derby league

- Metro area: Edmonton, Alberta, Canada
- Country: Canada
- Founded: 2006
- Teams: E-Ville Dead (A team); Living Dead (B team); Blocking Dead (Juniors); Berzerkhers; Slice Girls; Black Gold Diggers (2006-2012, 2016); Las Pistolitas (2006-2018)
- Track type: Flat
- Venue: Kingsway Hangar (2006–2015); Mayfield Trade Center (2006–2014); Edmonton Sportsdome (2014–2020); Millennium Place (2022/2023-present)
- Affiliations: WFTDA
- Website: www.evillerollerderby.com

E-Ville Roller Derby is a flat track roller derby league based in Edmonton, Alberta, Canada. Founded in 2006, E-Ville was a member of the Women's Flat Track Derby Association (WFTDA). E-Ville welcomes women, trans, and gender-expansive athletes regardless of pronouns or gender presentation who feel most comfortable playing WFTDA roller derby.

== History and organization ==
E-Ville Roller Derby was founded in 2006 by Laura "Chasey Maim" Holochuk along with six other women. By January 2010, the league had more than fifty skaters, and claimed to be the largest roller derby league in northern Alberta. In 2010, E-Ville launched the first junior roller derby league in Canada.

In 2013, E-Ville hosted what was billed as "Canada's first roller derby championships" at the West Edmonton Mall, in which they finished in third place. During 2014, E-Ville Roller Derby moved to Edmonton Sportsdome due to the demolition of Mayfield Trade Center. The league celebrated its tenth anniversary in 2016.

League skater Hell'on Keller was selected to play for Team Canada at the 2011 Roller Derby World Cup, the first time Canada was represented at the event. Shania Pain played with Team Canada in the 2017-18 season and Emsky Hammer played with Team Canada in the 2024-25 season.

During the COVID-19 pandemic, E-Ville Roller Derby suspended practices. In early 2021, the Edmonton Sportsdome, then the league's main practice space, was abandoned and deflated. E-Ville has practiced, scrimmaged, and held games and tournaments at different arenas around the Edmonton area, including Millennium Place in Sherwood Park and Heritage Plaza in Stony Plain. E-Ville returned to practicing in January 2023.

== Teams ==
Like in many roller derby leagues, many E-Ville skaters left the sport during the COVID-19 pandemic, and the league no longer had the numbers to support multiple teams. As of 2025, E-Ville has one team composed of all the adult skaters in the league. In 2023, E-Ville created a juniors program for skaters starting at age 8. The juniors team is called Blocking Dead.

Prior to 2020, the league had three house teams; two travel teams which competed against teams from other leagues; the E-Ville Dead WFTDA-charter team; and the Living Dead B team. The former house teams included the Black Gold Diggers and Las Pistolitas, which folded in 2012 and 2018 respectively. However, the Black Gold Diggers returned and played for a one-off game in 2016. The house league teams used to compete for an annual championship called the Gage Cup, named for the late son of a former league member. The Berzerkhers won the title in 2013, Las Pistolitas in 2016, the Slice Girls in 2010, 2011, 2014 and 2015, and former home team the Black Gold Diggers won the title in 2009 and 2012.

== WFTDA competition ==
E-Ville joined the WFTDA Apprentice Program in January 2015, and became a full member in March 2016. E-Ville made their WFTDA Playoffs debut in 2017 at the Division 2 Playoffs and Championships as the 15th seed, and finished in eighth place after a 295–238 loss to Oklahoma Victory Dolls.

=== WFTDA rankings ===
Season	Final ranking	Playoffs	Championship
2016	92 WFTDA	DNQ	DNQ
2017	51 WFTDA	N/A	8 D2
