= Columbia Roller Derby =

Roller derby league

Columbia QuadSquad
- Metro area: Columbia, SC
- Country: United States
- Founded: 2007
- Teams: Columbia QuadSquad (A), Soda City Jerks (B), Columbia Junior Rollers (Juniors)
- Track type: Flat
- Venue: Jamil Temple
- Affiliations: WFTDA
- Website: columbiarollerderby.com

Columbia Roller Derby is a roller derby league based in Columbia, South Carolina. Founded in 2007, the league has two travel teams: Columbia Quad Squad (A) and Soda City Jerks (B) as well as a junior roller derby team, Columbia Junior Roller Derby. Columbia is a member of the Women's Flat Track Derby Association (WFTDA).

== League history ==
Founded in March 2007 by eight local women, Columbia played its first bout in August 2007. The league consisted of the Allstars, who represented the league in WFTDA interleague competitions around the country, and the Miss B-havers, the B team. There were also three home teams: Belles on Wheels, Capitol City Vixens and Spawn of Skatin'. The travel teams have since been renamed Columbia QuadSquad (A) and Soda City Jerks (B).

In April 2009, it hosted and won the first South Carolina state championships, defeating the Lowcountry Highrollers and the Richland County Regulators. It has attracted attention for the diverse jobs held by its members, including a figure skater and an aquatic biologist, while its coach is a law professor at the University of South Carolina.

The QuadSquad was accepted into the Women's Flat Track Derby Association Apprentice Program in April 2011, and became a full member of the WFTDA in March 2012.

The league was described in the local Free Times as having "regional dominance". Columbia defeated Carolina Roller Derby in February 2012, following which, it was ranked at number 25 in the Derby News Network Power Rankings. Announced a few hours before becoming a full WFTDA member, Columbia Roller Derby was the second apprentice league ever to enter the Power Rankings, after the London Rollergirls.

In 2016, Columbia hosted a WFTDA Division 1 Playoff tournament at the Columbia Metropolitan Convention Center, which was forecasted to create over $300,000 in economic impact.

== WFTDA competition ==
Columbia QuadSquad, ranked at the time 41st in the WFTDA, was selected to play in the 2013 WFTDA Division 1 Playoffs. They competed in Asheville, North Carolina September 20–22, 2013. Columbia entered the weekend as the tenth seed, and ultimately finished in tenth place. In 2014, Columbia again qualified for Division 1 Playoffs, entering the Charleston tournament as the ninth seed, and finished in eighth place. In 2015, Columbia dropped into Division 2 Playoffs as the third seed in Cleveland, and ended the weekend in ninth place. In 2016, Columbia returned to Division 1 Playoffs and competed at the tournament they themselves hosted, finishing the weekend with their opening seeding, in eighth place. Columbia qualified for the Division 2 Playoffs and Championship in 2017 as the eleventh seed in Pittsburgh, and finished in eleventh place with a 167-156 victory over No Coast Derby Girls.

In 2018, Columbia qualified for the WFTDA North American East Continental Cup held in Kalamazoo, Michigan as the sixth seed, but after losing their quarter final to Charlottesville Derby Dames 203-107 finished out of the medals.

=== Rankings ===
Season	Final ranking	Playoffs	Championship
2012	14 E	DNQ	DNQ
2013	46 WFTDA	10 D1	DNQ
2014	35 WFTDA	8 D1	DNQ
2015	43 WFTDA	9 D2	DNQ
2016	29 WFTDA	8 D1	DNQ
2017	49 WFTDA	N/A	11 D2
2018	56 WFTDA	CR CC NA East	NA

- CR = consolation round

== Southern Discomfort tournament ==
In late April 2014 the league hosted its first annual Southern Discomfort Tournament. This invitational tournament hosted 10 teams featuring Killamazoo Derby Darlins, Charlotte Roller Girls, DC Rollergirls, Nashville Roller Girls, Cape Fear Roller Girls, Garden State Roller Girls, Brandywine Roller Girls, Roc City Roller Derby, Charlottesville Derby Dames, and the Columbia Roller Derby themselves.
