= Boulder County Roller Derby =

Roller derby league

- Metro area: Longmont, Colorado
- Country: United States
- Founded: 2011
- Teams: All-Stars (A team), Bombshells (B team), Screaming Mimis (C team), Daisy Nukes, Shrap Nellies, Night Witches, Bottle Rockets (Juniors)
- Track type: Flat
- Venue: Boulder County Fairgrounds
- Affiliations: WFTDA
- Coach: John Leboeuf-Little (Papa Whiskey), Matthew Williams (Lord Voldematt), Sydney Cooper Mortensen (Catastrophoebe), Kaylee Hart (Bash Tag)
- Website: www.bouldercountybombers.com

Boulder County Roller Derby (BCRD) is a women's flat track roller derby league based in Longmont, Colorado. Founded in 2011 as the Boulder County Bombers, Boulder County is a member of the Women's Flat Track Derby Association (WFTDA).

== League History ==
The league was founded in mid-2011 by Courtney MacArthur, known as "Bev O'Lution" (and also as "Super Cali 'Agilistic' Expialidocious"), a former skater with the Rocky Mountain Rollergirls who had moved to nearby Boulder, Colorado. The first practice attracted 35 potential skaters, and by 2013 the league had around 100 members, and was also launching a junior roller derby program.

In 2012, MacArthur's husband, J.D. Hemminger, joined the league as its coach, utilising approaches learned from American football. The following year, the Bombers won the Colorado Cup tournament. MacArthur and Hemminger left Colorado in 2014.

Currently, the head coach for Boulder County Roller Derby is John Leboeuf-Little, known as Papa Whiskey. He coaches the charter team, the All Stars, and the B level team, the Bombshells. His assistant coach is Matthew Williams, also known as Lord Voldematt. A C level travel team, the Screaming Mimis, was added in 2017. The Screaming Mimis and home teams are coached by Sydney Cooper Mortensen and Kaylee Hart, also known as Catastrophoebe and Bash Tag, respectively.

BCRD has three home teams who bout against each other during the season. The original two home teams are the Shrap Nellies and Daisy Nukes. The Night Witches were added to the home team ranks in 2017.

The league's junior roller derby team, the Bottle Rockets, play by the JRDA ruleset.

== League Structure ==
=== Travel Teams ===
- All-Stars (A)
- Bombshells (B)
- Screaming Mimis (C)

=== Home Teams ===
- Shrap Nellies
- Daisy Nukes
- Night Witches

=== Junior team ===
- Bottle Rockets

== WFTDA competition ==
Boulder County was accepted as a member of the Women's Flat Track Derby Association Apprentice Program in July 2012, and it became a full WFTDA member in September 2013. Boulder County first qualified for WFTDA Playoffs in 2014, as the sixth seed at the Division 2 tournament in Kitchener-Waterloo, Ontario. There they lost their opening game to Rideau Valley Roller Girls, followed by a narrow loss to Demolition City Roller Derby, before defeating Grand Raggidy Roller Girls 244–172 to claim ninth place. In 2015, Boulder County returned to Division 2 Playoffs as the seventh seed in Detroit, where they dropped their first two games to Bear City Roller Derby and Wasatch Roller Derby, before beating the Brewcity Bruisers 232–147 to again finish in ninth place. In 2016, Boulder County returned again to Division 2 Playoffs, this time as the eighth seed in Wichita. Boulder County opened with a 162–82 win over ninth-seeded Chicago Outfit Roller Derby, but then lost in the quarterfinals to Jet City Rollergirls 175–160. Boulder County then narrowly beat the Kansas City Roller Warriors 201–200, and Houston Roller Derby 184–181 to win fifth place - and in defeating second-seeded Houston became the lowest-ranked team to defeat a two seed in WFTDA Playoff history.

=== Rankings ===
Season	Final ranking	Playoffs	Championship
2013	NR	DNQ	DNQ
2014	62 WFTDA	9 D2	DNQ
2015	55 WFTDA	9 D2	DNQ
2016	53 WFTDA	5 D2	DNQ
2017	69 WFTDA	DNQ	DNQ
