= Women's Flat Track Derby Association Division 2 =

International roller-derby division

The Women's Flat Track Derby Association Division 2 (WFTDA Division 2) was the second-highest level of play in women's flat track roller derby from 2013 through 2017. Comprising different structures over that time, in early 2018 the Women's Flat Track Derby Association (WFTDA) announced it was replacing the Division 2 Playoffs with geographically based Continental Cups, the structure and quantity of which is expected to adjust and possibly expand over time.

== Organisation ==
Historically, the WFTDA divided member leagues into four geographical regions: East, North Central, South Central and West. At the start of 2013, these were redivided into three divisions, each operating worldwide. However, foreseeing continued growth in membership, the WFTDA stated that future developments were likely to include new regional structures alongside the divisional system.

For 2013 and 2014, the division consisted of the members of the Women's Flat Track Derby Association who were ranked from 41 to 100. The rankings were set at the start of each year, based on performance over the previous year. Although rankings are updated during the year, teams would only transfer between divisions at the start of each year. Teams in Division 2 played in bouts through the year, aiming to qualify for one of the end-of-year playoff tournaments. Any Division 2 teams which were ranked in the WFTDA's top forty at the end of June each year qualified for the WFTDA Division 1 Playoffs. Those ranked between 41 and 60, which might have included WFTDA Division 3 teams who met sanctioned-game play requirements, qualified for one of the two Division 2 Playoffs.

Starting with 2015, sanctioned-game play requirements were modified to be simply any four WFTDA-sanctioned games played between December 1 of the previous calendar year and June 30, without a requirement to play a certain number of games against similarly ranked opponents. Teams which did not play a minimum number of sanctioned bouts were not permitted to compete at the Playoffs. Eligible teams ranked 41-60 as of June of the calendar year remained eligible for Division 2 Playoffs. If a team that meets eligibility requirements declines their invitation, the teams ranked next beyond 60 fill available spots so that 20 teams still take part.

Starting with 2017, the system was restructured to place the top 36 teams in the WFTDA in Division 1, with teams ranked 37 through 52 qualifying for a single, 16-team Division 2 Playoff tournament and championship. The 2017 tournament was held in Pittsburgh, Pennsylvania, hosted by Steel City Roller Derby.

== 2017 member leagues ==
The 2017 Division 2 member list was announced by the WFTDA on July 14. Two eligible leagues, Sun State Roller Girls of Brisbane, Australia and Sac City Rollers of Sacramento, California both declined, and combined with other higher ranked teams either declining or not meeting eligibility requirements, allowed teams as low as #58 Dublin Roller Derby to participate. As a result, the table below features 18 teams, including the two that declined participating in the Pittsburgh Playoffs and Championship.

| League | City | Country | Year(s) of membership |
|---|---|---|---|
| Auld Reekie Roller Girls | Edinburgh | Scotland | 2014, 2016, (Note: team declined invitation to Playoffs this year) 2017 |
| Bear City Roller Derby | Berlin | Germany | 2015, 2016, 2017 |
| Boston Roller Derby | Boston, MA | United States | 2017 |
| Columbia Quadsquad | Columbia, SC | United States | 2013, 2014, 2015, 2017 |
| Dublin Roller Derby | Dublin | Ireland | 2017 |
| E-Ville Roller Derby | Edmonton, AB | Canada | 2017 |
| Jet City Rollergirls | Everett, WA | United States | 2013, 2015, 2016, 2017 |
| Middlesbrough Roller Derby | Teesside | England | 2017 |
| Naptown Roller Derby | Indianapolis, IN | United States | 2015, 2017 |
| No Coast Derby Girls | Lincoln, NE | United States | 2017 |
| Ohio Roller Derby | Columbus, OH | United States | 2017 |
| Oklahoma Victory Dolls | Oklahoma City, OK | United States | 2013, 2015, 2017 |
| Paris Rollergirls | Paris | France | 2017 |
| Pirate City Rollers | Auckland | New Zealand | 2017 |
| Sac City Rollers | Sacramento, CA | United States | 2014, 2015, 2016, 2017 (Note: Sac City and Sacred City merged in late 2017, and in January 2018 rebranded as Sacramento Roller Derby.) |
| Sun State Roller Girls | Brisbane, QLD | Australia | 2017 |
| Treasure Valley Rollergirls | Boise, ID | United States | 2013, 2014, 2015, 2017 |
| Tucson Roller Derby | Tucson, AZ | United States | 2013, 2014, 2016, 2017 |

== Past members ==
The initial Division 1 membership list for 2013 was based upon the team's rankings as of June 30, 2012. The 2014 Division 2 membership list was announced on 9 December 2013, based on the overall rankings that took effect as of 30 November 2013. The membership of Division 2 in 2014 mostly comprised teams from the United States, but also three from Canada and two from Scotland. From 2013-14, membership comprised teams ranked 41-100 overall per those year's specified dates.

With Division 2 game play requirements abandoned starting with the 2015 season, membership currently denotes teams that meet gameplay requirements and thus eligibility for that year's Division 2 Playoffs, and includes teams who declined Playoff invitations, along with higher-ranked teams that competed. The 2015 membership list was derived from that year's June 30 rankings. The 2016 Division 2 member list was announced by the WFTDA on July 15 of that year. Two eligible leagues, Auld Reekie Roller Girls of Edinburgh and Paradise City Roller Derby of Gold Coast, Australia both declined, allowing #61 Grand Raggidy Roller Girls and #62 Carolina Rollergirls to take part.

| League | City | Country | Year(s) of membership | Current status |
|---|---|---|---|---|
| Alamo City Rollergirls | San Antonio, TX | United States | 2013 | out of Playoffs |
| Arizona Roller Derby | Phoenix, AZ | United States | 2014 | Division 1 |
| Assassination City Roller Derby | Plano, TX | United States | 2013 | out of Playoffs |
| Babe City Rollers | Bemidji, MN | United States | 2013 | out of Playoffs |
| Bellingham Roller Betties | Bellingham, WA | United States | 2013 | out of Playoffs |
| Big Easy Rollergirls | New Orleans, LA | United States | 2013, 2014 | out of Playoffs |
| Bleeding Heartland Rollergirls | Bloomington, IN | United States | 2013 | out of Playoffs |
| Blue Ridge Rollergirls | Asheville, NC | United States | 2013, 2014, 2016 | Division 1 |
| Boulder County Bombers | Longmont, CO | United States | 2015, 2016 | out of Playoffs |
| Brandywine Roller Derby | Downingtown, PA | United States | 2014, 2015, 2016 | out of Playoffs |
| Brewcity Bruisers | Milwaukee, WI | United States | 2014, 2015 | out of Playoffs |
| Burning River Roller Girls | Cleveland, OH | United States | 2013, 2014 | out of Playoffs |
| Cape Fear Roller Girls | Wilmington, NC | United States | 2013 | out of Playoffs |
| Calgary Roller Derby Association | Calgary, AB | Canada | 2016 | Division 1 |
| Carolina Rollergirls | Raleigh, NC | United States | 2014, 2016 | out of Playoffs |
| Central New York Roller Derby | Utica, NY | United States | 2013 | out of Playoffs |
| Charlotte Roller Girls | Charlotte, NC | United States | 2014 | out of Playoffs |
| Charlottesville Derby Dames | Charlottesville, VA | United States | 2016 | Division 1 |
| Charm City Roller Girls | Baltimore, MD | United States | 2016 | Division 1 |
| Chicago Outfit Roller Derby | Chicago, IL | United States | 2014, 2015, 2016 | out of Playoffs |
| Cincinnati Rollergirls | Cincinnati, OH | United States | 2016 | out of Playoffs |
| CT RollerGirls | Naugatuck, CT | United States | 2013, 2014 | out of Playoffs |
| Dallas Derby Devils | Dallas, TX | United States | 2013, 2014 | Division 1 |
| DC Rollergirls | Washington, D.C. | United States | 2014 | out of Playoffs |
| Demolition City Roller Derby | Evansville, IN | United States | 2013, 2014, 2015 | out of Playoffs |
| Des Moines Derby Dames | Des Moines, IA | United States | 2013, 2014 | folded (Note: Des Moines folded at the end of 2014. Team United Women's Roller Derby was subsequently founded as a new league in Des Moines.) |
| Dominion Derby Girls | Virginia Beach, VA | United States | 2013 | out of Playoffs |
| Duke City Derby | Albuquerque, NM | United States | 2013, 2014 | out of Playoffs |
| Dutchland Rollers | Lancaster, PA | United States | 2014 | out of Playoffs |
| Emerald City Roller Girls | Eugene, OR | United States | 2013, 2014, 2015 | out of Playoffs |
| Fabulous Sin City Rollergirls | Las Vegas, NV | United States | 2013, 2014 | out of Playoffs |
| Fargo Moorhead Derby Girls | Fargo, ND | United States | 2013, 2014 | out of Playoffs |
| Fort Myers Derby Girls | Fort Myers, FL | United States | 2014 | out of Playoffs |
| Fort Wayne Derby Girls | Fort Wayne, IN | United States | 2013 | out of Playoffs |
| Gainesville Roller Rebels | Gainesville, FL | United States | 2014 | out of Playoffs |
| Garden State Rollergirls | Wallington, NJ | United States | 2014 | out of Playoffs |
| Glasgow Roller Derby | Glasgow | Scotland | 2014 | out of Playoffs |
| Gold Coast Derby Grrls | Fort Lauderdale, FL | United States | 2013, 2014 | out of Playoffs |
| Grand Raggidy Roller Girls | Grand Rapids, MI | United States | 2013, 2014, 2016 | out of Playoffs |
| Green Mountain Derby Dames | Burlington, VT | United States | 2013, 2014 | out of Playoffs |
| Hammer City Roller Girls | Hamilton, ON | Canada | 2014 | out of Playoffs |
| Hard Knox Roller Girls | Knoxville, TN | United States | 2013 | out of Playoffs |
| Houston Roller Derby | Houston, TX | United States | 2015, 2016 | Division 1 |
| Humboldt Roller Derby | Eureka, CA | United States | 2013, 2014 | out of Playoffs |
| Ithaca League of Women Rollers | Ithaca, NY | United States | 2013, 2014 | out of Playoffs |
| Kansas City Roller Warriors | Kansas City, MO | United States | 2015, 2016 | out of Playoffs |
| Killamazoo Derby Darlins | Kalamazoo, MI | United States | 2013, 2014 | out of Playoffs |
| Long Island Roller Rebels | New York, NY | United States | 2013, 2014 | out of Playoffs |
| Lowcountry Highrollers | Charleston, SC | United States | 2014 | out of Playoffs |
| Maine Roller Derby | Portland, ME | United States | 2013, 2014 | out of Playoffs |
| Memphis Roller Derby | Memphis, TN | United States | 2013, 2014 | out of Playoffs |
| Mid Iowa Rollers | Des Moines, IA | United States | 2013 | inactive (Note: Mid Iowa is inactive as of 2017, but maintains a website. Team United Women's Roller Derby was formed with former Mid Iowa members.) |
| Nashville Rollergirls | Nashville, TN | United States | 2015, 2016 | out of Playoffs |
| NEO Roller Derby | Akron, OH | United States | 2013, 2014 | merged (Note: NEO merged with Rubber City at the end of 2016, and the merged organization rebranded as Akron Roller Derby.) |
| New Hampshire Roller Derby | Manchester, NH | United States | 2013 | out of Playoffs |
| Nidaros Roller Derby | Trondheim | Norway | 2016 | out of Playoffs |
| North Star Roller Girls | Minneapolis, MN | United States | 2013, 2014 | out of Playoffs |
| Northwest Arkansas Rollergirls | Fayetteville, AR | United States | 2013, 2014 | out of Playoffs |
| Oklahoma City Roller Derby | Oklahoma City, OK | United States | 2014 | merged (Note: Oklahoma City merged into Oklahoma Victory Dolls in early 2017, and the combined organization continues under the latter's name.) |
| Old Capitol City Roller Girls | Iowa City, IA | United States | 2013, 2014 | out of Playoffs |
| Omaha Rollergirls | Omaha, NE | United States | 2014 | out of Playoffs |
| Paper Valley Roller Girls | Appleton, WI | United States | 2013, 2014 | merged (Note: Paper Valley merged with Fox City Foxz in late 2015, and the merged organization rebranded as Fox Cities Roller Derby.) |
| Paradise City Roller Derby | Burleigh, QLD | Australia | 2016 (Note: team declined invitation to Playoffs this year) | out of Playoffs |
| Pikes Peak Derby Dames | Colorado Springs, CO | United States | 2013, 2014 | out of Playoffs |
| Providence Roller Derby | Providence, RI | United States | 2013, 2014 | out of Playoffs |
| Queen City Roller Girls | Buffalo, NY | United States | 2013, 2014 | Division 1 |
| Rage City Rollergirls | Anchorage, AK | United States | 2013 | out of Playoffs |
| Rideau Valley Roller Girls | Ottawa, ON | Canada | 2014 | out of Playoffs |
| River City Rollergirls | Richmond, VA | United States | 2013, 2014 | out of Playoffs |
| Roc City Roller Derby | Rochester, NY | United States | 2013, 2014 | out of Playoffs |
| Sacred City Derby Girls | Sacramento, CA | United States | 2014, 2015 | out of Playoffs (Note: Sac City and Sacred City merged in late 2017, and in January 2018 rebranded as Sacramento Roller Derby.) |
| Santa Cruz Derby Girls | Santa Cruz, CA | United States | 2013, 2015 | Division 1 |
| Silicon Valley Roller Girls | San Jose, CA | United States | 2013, 2014 | out of Playoffs |
| Sioux City Roller Dames | Sioux City, IA | United States | 2013, 2014 | out of Playoffs |
| Sioux Falls Roller Dollz | Sioux Falls, SD | United States | 2013 | out of Playoffs |
| Slaughter County Roller Vixens | Kitsap County, WA | United States | 2013 | out of Playoffs |
| SoCal Derby | San Diego, CA | United States | 2014 | out of Playoffs |
| Sonoma County Roller Derby | Santa Rosa, CA | United States | 2013, 2014 | out of Playoffs |
| Springfield Roller Girls | Springfield, MO | United States | 2013 | out of Playoffs |
| St. Chux Derby Chix | St. Charles, MO | United States | 2014, 2015 | out of Playoffs |
| Suburbia Roller Derby | Yonkers, NY | United States | 2013, 2014 | out of Playoffs |
| Tallahassee Rollergirls | Tallahassee, FL | United States | 2014 | out of Playoffs |
| Terminal City Rollergirls | Vancouver, BC | Canada | 2013 | Division 1 |
| Toronto Roller Derby | Toronto, ON | Canada | 2013 | out of Playoffs |
| Tri-City Roller Derby | Kitchener, ON | Canada | 2013, 2014, 2016 | out of Playoffs |
| Twin City Derby Girls | Champaign-Urbana, IL | United States | 2014 | out of Playoffs |
| Victorian Roller Derby League | Melbourne, VIC | Australia | 2013 | Division 1 |
| Wasatch Roller Derby | Salt Lake City, UT | United States | 2015, 2016 | Division 1 |

== Playoff tournaments ==
=== 2013 ===
Both of the 2013 Playoff tournaments were played in the United States.

| Location | Dates | Champion | Second | Third |
|---|---|---|---|---|
| Des Moines, IA | 16-18 August 2013 | Jet City Rollergirls | Blue Ridge Rollergirls | Treasure Valley Rollergirls |
| Kalamazoo, MI | 23-25 August 2013 | Santa Cruz Derby Girls | Sac City Rollers | Killamazoo Derby Darlins |

2013 Championship

| Location | Dates | Champion | Second | Third |
|---|---|---|---|---|
| Milwaukee, WI | 8-10 November, 2013 | Jet City Rollergirls | Santa Cruz Derby Girls | Blue Ridge Rollergirls |

=== 2014 ===
The first 2014 Playoff tournament was held in Duluth, Minnesota, and the second was held in Kitchener-Waterloo, Ontario, Canada, the first WFTDA Playoff tournament to be held outside the United States. At Kitchener-Waterloo, the Rideau Valley Roller Girls from Ottawa, Ontario became the first non-American team to win a WFTDA playoff tournament.

| Location | Dates | Champion | Second | Third |
|---|---|---|---|---|
| Duluth, MN | 15-17 August 2014 | Detroit Derby Girls | Fabulous Sin City Rollergirls | St. Chux Derby Chix |
| Kitchener-Waterloo, ON | 22-24 August 2014 | Rideau Valley Roller Girls | Bear City Roller Derby | Killamazoo Derby Darlins |

2014 Championship

| Location | Dates | Champion | Second | Third |
|---|---|---|---|---|
| Nashville, TN | 31 October - 2 November, 2014 | Detroit Derby Girls | Rideau Valley Roller Girls | Bear City Roller Derby |

=== 2015 ===
Both 2015 Playoffs were held in the United States.

| Location | Dates | Champion | Second | Third |
|---|---|---|---|---|
| Cleveland, OH | 21-23 August 2015 | Kansas City Roller Warriors | Demolition City Roller Derby | Santa Cruz Derby Girls |
| Detroit, MI | 28-30 August 2015 | Nashville Rollergirls | Sacred City Derby Girls | Naptown Roller Girls |

2015 Championship

| Location | Dates | Champion | Second | Third |
|---|---|---|---|---|
| Saint Paul, MN | 6-8 November 2015 | Sacred City Derby Girls | Nashville Rollergirls | Demolition City Roller Derby |

=== 2016 ===
Both 2016 Playoffs were again held in the United States.

| Location | Dates | Champion | Second | Third |
|---|---|---|---|---|
| Wichita, KS | 19-21 August 2016 | Brandywine Roller Derby | Blue Ridge Rollergirls | Jet City Rollergirls |
| Lansing, MI | 26-28 August 2016 | Calgary Roller Derby Association | Charlottesville Derby Dames | Charm City Roller Girls |

2016 Championship

| Location | Dates | Champion | Second | Third |
|---|---|---|---|---|
| Portland, OR | 4-6 November 2016 | Blue Ridge Rollergirls | Brandywine Roller Derby | Calgary Roller Derby Association |

=== 2017 ===
Playoffs and Championship In 2017, the Playoffs were combined into a single two-track tournament in Pittsburgh, Pennsylvania, with the Division 2 championship awarded at its conclusion.

| Location | Dates | Champion | Second | Third |
|---|---|---|---|---|
| Pittsburgh, PA | 18-20 August 2017 | Boston Roller Derby | Paris Rollergirls | Naptown Roller Derby |
