= Santa Cruz Roller Derby =

Roller derby league

- Metro area: Santa Cruz, California
- Country: United States
- Founded: 2009
- Teams: Boardwalk Bombshells (A Team); Harbor Hellcats (B Team); Seabright Sirens (C Team)
- Track type: Flat
- Venue: Santa Cruz Civic Auditorium
- Affiliations: WFTDA
- Org. type: Non Profit, 501(c)3
- Website: www.santacruzrollerderby.org

Santa Cruz Roller Derby (SCRD) is a women's flat track roller derby league in Santa Cruz, California. The first female, amateur flat-track roller derby league in Santa Cruz, SCRD is a member of the Women's Flat Track Derby Association (WFTDA).

The league consists of three A-B-C adult travel teams, and one mixed-level home team.

== History ==
Flat-track roller derby came to Santa Cruz for the first time with the founding of the Santa Cruz Rollergirls in early 2007 by Robin Hoff, aka "Robin YoLife", formerly of Seattle's Rat City Rollergirls).

In early 2009, the LLC known as Santa Cruz Rollergirls was dissolved, and a majority of the skaters moved on to establish the Santa Cruz Derby Girls as a non-profit roller derby league. In September 2010, Santa Cruz Derby Girls was accepted as a full member of the Women's Flat Track Derby Association., and in 2011, the league earned 501(c)(3) classification. The league moved into the newly inaugurated Kaiser Permanente Arena in 2013, with a then-record (for the league) crowd of 2,178 who saw Santa Cruz defeat Las Vegas' Sin City Rollergirls 153–124.

In 2015, SCDG returned to the Santa Cruz Civic Auditorium, where they had previously played in 2010.

In 2019, the Santa Cruz Derby Girls were rebranded as Santa Cruz Roller Derby.

=== League Structure ===
Santa Cruz's all-star travel team is the Boardwalk Bombshells, and they have represented the league internationally in WFTDA-sanctioned play, continuously since 2010. The B team, the Harbor Hellcats, and the C team, the Seabright Sirens, compete in regional games and tournaments.

From 2015 to 2018 the Santa Cruz Derby Girls adopted a home team structure, comprising the Organic Panic, Redwood Rebels and the Steamer Janes. The three home teams competed for an annual championship. The Steamer Janes won the inaugural home championship in 2015. The Redwood Rebels took home the championship in 2016, and the Steamer Janes took it back in 2017.

In 2018, the league returned to their original A-B-C structure, with the addition of a mixed-level adult recreational team, the Steamer Janes. As with other leagues around the world, the COVID-19 pandemic affected SCRD and its structure.

=== Junior Derby Program ===
The Santa Cruz Derby Groms were the league's junior roller derby affiliate, and were established in the summer of 2009. Most members range from the ages of 10 to seventeen and are split up into two teams, the Sugar Skulls and the Bumper Scars. From 2009 to 2012, the Groms played positional derby only (no hitting). In 2012, the junior league established its first full-contact Junior Roller Derby Association (JRDA) travel team, the Gromshells, made up of advanced skaters playing at the highest level of junior competition. Within 5 years, the Gromshells reached their goal of becoming the number-one ranked JRDA team in the all-female division.

A second full-contact team, the Saltwater Sassies, was established in 2017, for intermediate players age 10+, to practice skills and strategy while competing regionally. In 2018, the league founded the Grommets Training Program, for beginner-level skaters ages 7 and up. The Grommets learn basic skating skills and positional derby with light contact, and have the opportunity to join the Saltwater Sassies when they are ready for full-contact.

As of 2019, the Santa Cruz Derby Groms became their own league independent of SCRD.

== WFTDA competition ==
=== Early years (2010-2020) ===
Santa Cruz was initially placed in the WFTDA's West Region, and did not qualify for West Regional Playoffs during this time. In 2013, Santa Cruz qualified for WFTDA Playoffs for the first time. Ahead of the season, the WFTDA announced the creation of a divisional ranking system for rankings. Santa Cruz was initially ranked at the lower end of Division 2, but throughout the season improved their rankings and eventually entered Division 2 Playoffs in Kalamazoo as the top seed. Santa Cruz defeated the Sac City Rollers of Sacramento 230–185 to win the tournament and earn a trip to the Division 2 championship. At the 2014 WFTDA Championships in Milwaukee, Santa Cruz eventually fell to the Jet City Rollergirls by one point, with a final score of 195–194.

In 2014, Santa Cruz qualified for Division 1 Playoffs for the first time, and entered the Sacramento tournament as the sixth seed. After being upset by lower-ranked Tampa, Santa Cruz finished the tournament in seventh place with a 171–122 win over the Kansas City Roller Warriors. Santa Cruz returned to Division 2 Playoffs in 2015, and as in 2013 was a top seed, with an overall ranking of 42 in June. In Cleveland, an upset loss to Demolition City Roller Derby knocked Santa Cruz into the third place game and out of contention for WFTDA Championships; they defeated Houston Roller Derby 154–141 to claim third. For 2016 Santa Cruz bounced back to the Division 1 level, and as before was the sixth seed at their tournament, this time in Columbia, South Carolina. And, as in 2014, Santa Cruz again finished their D1 tournament in seventh place, this time by defeating the host league Columbia Quadsquad, 174–141. In 2017, Santa Cruz finished out of the medals at the Division 1 tournament in Dallas, losing 156–106 to Philly Roller Derby and in a final jam loss to Dallas Derby Devils, 170–162. In 2018, Santa Cruz qualified for WFTDA Playoffs in A Coruña, Spain where they finished in the consolation round, ending their weekend with a 186–139 victory in a rematch against Philly.

=== Post-Pandemic (2021-Present) ===
After the COVID-19 pandemic, WFTDA reorganized their international play and Santa Cruz Roller Derby moved into the North American West (NAW) region.

=== Rankings ===
Season	Final ranking	Playoffs	Championship
2010	NR	DNQ	DNQ
2011	15 W	DNQ	DNQ
2012	16 W	DNQ	DNQ
2013	32 WFTDA	1 D2	2 D2
2014	24 WFTDA	7 D1	DNQ
2015	44 WFTDA	3 D2	DNQ
2016	23 WFTDA	7 D1	DNQ
2017	23 WFTDA	CR D1	DNQ
2018	14 WFTDA	CR D1	DNQ
2019	19 WFTDA	CR D1	DNQ
2024	5 NA WEST	NA West Regionals D1	DNQ
2026	23 NA WEST	NA Ontario Regionals D1	DNQ

- CR = consolation round

== In the community ==
As dedicated members of the Santa Cruz community, Santa Cruz Roller Derby volunteer hundreds of hours each season at numerous events and fundraisers in the Bay Area. In addition, each Santa Cruz Roller Derby home bout features a local non profit or charity which receives a portion of proceeds from that bout.

Local artist Jim Phillips designed their original Derby Girl logo.
