= Charlottesville Derby Dames =

Roller derby league in Virginia, US

- Metro area: Charlottesville, VA
- Country: United States
- Founded: 2007
- Teams: All Stars (A team), Belmont Bruisers (B team), Charlottesville Junior Roller Derby
- Track type(s): Flat
- Venue: Charlottesville Main Street Arena
- Affiliations: WFTDA
- Website: www.charlottesvillederbydames.com

Charlottesville Derby Dames (CDD) is a women's flat-track roller derby league based in Charlottesville, Virginia. Founded in 2007, CDD is a member of the Women's Flat Track Derby Association (WFTDA).

== History and organization ==
Following a social media post by Shannon "Hoytie Toytie" Hoyt, the league was founded in 2007 by Jessika Daver and Anna "Phenol Barbie Doll" Perron, and held its first practices late that year. CDD played its first home bout in October 2009, against the Northside Stranglers. In August 2012, the league hosted a state roller derby championship, "Virginia is for Shovers". The league was accepted into the Women's Flat Track Derby Association (WFTDA) Apprentice Program in January 2012, and graduated to full membership of the WFTDA in December 2012. In January 2013, they were declared Charlottesville's "official roller derby team", by the city's mayor.

As of 2017, Charlottesville has two travel teams, the All Stars and the Belmont Bruisers. The league's mission is "to promote sportsmanship and community by providing an alternative form of fitness and entertainment to the women and men of Charlottesville and surrounding counties".

The league has also run a junior roller derby team since April 2014, Charlottesville Junior Roller Derby, who are members of JRDA.

In March 2025, the Charlottesville Derby Dames announced on Facebook that they were changing their name to Charlottesville Roller Derby and released a new logo to re-iterate their commitment to inclusiveness.

== WFTDA competition ==
Charlottesville qualified for WFTDA Playoffs for the first time in 2015, entering the Division 1 Playoff in Jacksonville as the tenth seed. After an opening round upset over Glasgow, Charlottesville fell to Denver, Detroit and Steel City (Pittsburgh) to finish in eighth place. In 2016, Charlottesville entered the Division 2 Playoff in Lansing, Michigan as the seventh seed, and defeated #10 Grand Raggidy Roller Girls (Grand Rapids, MI), #2 Sac City Rollers (Sacramento) and #3 Wasatch Roller Derby (Salt Lake City) before falling 189-165 to Calgary to finish in second place, albeit with a berth in the Division 2 bracket of WFTDA Championships. At Championships, a narrow 205-200 loss to Brandywine Roller Derby (Downingtown, PA) led to a rematch against Calgary in the third place game, a 252-197 Calgary victory, which gave Charlottesville a fourth-place finish. Charlottesville returned to Division 1 Playoffs in 2017 at Seattle as the twelfth seed, but lost both their games to Montreal Roller Derby (486-144) and Jacksonville RollerGirls (318-161) to finish outside of the medal round.

In 2018, Charlottesville for the WFTDA North American East Continental Cup held in Kalamazoo, Michigan as the third seed, and finished in second place, losing the gold medal game to Boston Roller Derby 206-169. Charlottesville skater River Styx Phoenix was named tournament MVP.

=== Rankings ===
Season	Final ranking	Playoffs	Championship
2013	106 WFTDA	DNQ	DNQ
2014	73 WFTDA	DNQ	DNQ
2015	34 WFTDA	8 D1	DNQ
2016	48 WFTDA	2 D2	4 D2
2017	37 WFTDA	CR D1	DNQ
2018	33 WFTDA	2 CC NA East	NA

- CR = consolation round
