= St. Chux Derby Chix =

Roller derby league

- Metro area: Saint Charles, Missouri
- Country: United States
- Founded: 2009
- Teams: Pack in Black (A team); Hells Belles (B team)
- Track type: Flat
- Venue: Matteson Square Garden
- Affiliations: WFTDA
- Website: Official website

St. Chux Derby Chix (SCDC) is a nonprofit, open-gender roller derby league located in St. Charles, Missouri. Founded in 2009, St. Chux is a member of the Women's Flat Track Derby Association (WFTDA).

== History ==
St. Chux Derby Chix was started in August 2009 by five women from St. Charles, Missouri. Although nearby St. Louis had an established roller derby team in the Arch Rival Roller Girls, there was a need for derby expansion in St. Charles. Establishing a skater run, skater owned, roller derby team began with recruitment, utilizing online advertising and word-of-mouth. The number of skaters grew until December 2009 when SCDC officially incorporated, adopted a set of bylaws, and made plans for their first competitive season. By 2011 the league comprised women between the ages of 19 and 41 with diverse backgrounds and occupations such as business owner, stay-at-home mom, certified medical assistant, special education coordinator, and product supervisor.

St. Chux was accepted into the WFTDA Apprentice Program in October 2011, and became a full member of the WFTDA in September 2012.

== WFTDA competition ==
In 2014, St. Chux made their WFTDA Playoffs debut at the Division 2 tournament in Duluth, Minnesota as the top seed. After opening the weekend with a 229-149 victory over Treasure Valley Rollergirls, St. Chux was upset by fifth seeded Sin City Rollergirls 174-141 in the semifinal. St. Chux then rebounded with a decisive 295-84 victory over Big Easy Rollergirls to finish in third place.

St. Chux returned to Division 2 Playoffs in 2015 as the seventh seed in Cleveland, winning their opening game against Brandywine, 205-196. A 218-149 loss to Kansas City Roller Warriors was followed by a 206-135 win against Jet City Rollergirls, putting them in the fifth place game, which they won in a thrilling last jam victory, 216-215, in a rematch against Brandywine.

=== Rankings ===
Season	Final ranking	Playoffs	Championship
2012	31 NC	DNQ	DNQ
2013	67 WFTDA	DNQ	DNQ
2014	38 WFTDA	3 D2	DNQ
2015	57 WFTDA	5 D2	DNQ
2016	70 WFTDA	DNQ	DNQ

== In the media ==
The St. Chux Derby Chix league has regularly been featured in the St. Louis area press. They are regular guests of Gary B and Randy Gardner broadcasting live on 590 The Fan KFNS (AM). Local television station KPLR-TV listed the team as a "Team of the Week" in June 2010. They were most recently featured on channel 5's Show Me St. Louis, and are favorite guests on the Thom & Jeff Show.

== Community work ==
Each bout is an opportunity for the Chix to give back to the community. In 2012, they raised funds for Walk MS, Miles Against Melanoma, Seize the Day Run, Disabled Athlete Sports Association, and Growing American Youth. On May 7, 2011, the league sponsored a bout for the Darryl Strawberry Foundation. In 2009, SCDC league members assisted the charity event "Pasta for Pets" during their annual auction event.
