= Blue Ridge Rollergirls =

Roller derby league

Blue Ridge Roller Derby (formally Blue Ridge Rollergirls)
- Metro area: Asheville, North Carolina
- Country: United States
- Founded: 2006
- Teams: Y’All-Stars (A team); Retrogrades (B team)
- Track type(s): Flat
- Venue: Smoky Mountain Event Center
- Affiliations: WFTDA
- Org. type: 501c(3) nonprofit corporation

Blue Ridge Roller Derby (BRRD) is a flat track roller derby league based in Asheville, North Carolina. Founded in 2006, Blue Ridge held its first competitive season in 2007, joined the WFTDA Apprentice Program in 2010, and became a full member of the Women's Flat Track Derby Association (WFTDA) in March 2012.

== Structure and history ==
Original Blue Ridge logo.

After first organizing in 2006, Blue Ridge held its first public games on June 30, 2007, at Carrier Park in Asheville, drawing over 300 fans. By 2012, Blue Ridge was drawing up to 2,000 fans to games at the Ag Center.

Blue Ridge Rollergirls is composed of two teams, the All-Stars travel team, and the French Broads, the BRRG B team (named for the French Broad River that flows through Asheville). The league also has two home teams: The Candy Apple Razorblades and The Wham Bam Thank You Ma'am's. The two home teams were initially created so that the league could play intraleague games when the league was first getting started and there weren't many other teams located near by. The home teams made appearance in 2016 to help celebrate the tenth anniversary of the league. Members of Blue Ridge formed a junior roller derby branch, the Mad Divas Junior Derby for girls 12–17.

In November 2012, the WFTDA announced that Blue Ridge would be the host league of one of its four International Division 1 Playoff tournaments, held in Asheville on 20–22 September 2013.

== WFTDA competition ==
Little over a year into WFTDA membership, Blue Ridge qualified for WFTDA Playoffs for the first time, qualifying for the first-ever Division 2 Playoff in Des Moines, Iowa. The third seed at Des Moines, Blue Ridge won their first-ever WFTDA Playoff game 188–120 over Duke City Derby (Albuquerque), and followed that with a semifinal, 179–170 victory against Treasure Valley Rollergirls (Boise), thus earning a trip to WFTDA Championships later in the year. In the Des Moines final, Blue Ridge fell 2018–113 to Jet City Rollergirls (Everett, Washington) to finish in second place. At Championships in Milwaukee, Blue Ridge won the third place game against Sac City Rollers (Sacramento) 215–188. In 2014, Blue Ridge was ranked at 41st place when tournament seedings were determined, but after a high-ranked team declined their invitation to Playoffs this allowed Blue Ridge to compete at Division 1 Playoffs instead. As the tenth seed in Sacramento, Blue Ridge lost all their games and finished in tenth place.

After missing WFTDA Playoffs entirely in 2015, Blue Ridge bounced back in 2016, entering the Division 2 Playoff in Wichita as the seventh seed. After opening Wichita with a win over tenth seed Carolina Rollergirls, Blue Ridge followed with rankings upsets over #2 Houston Roller Derby and #3 Nashville Roller Girls, before losing 146–123 to Brandywine Roller Derby to finish in second place. Blue Ridge jammer Dr. Octopushy was named MVP of the tournament. This time around a second-place Playoff finish allowed for the possibility of making the D2 Championship game, which Blue Ridge did after defeating Calgary Roller Derby Association in their opening game, 225–183. This set up a rematch of the Wichita final, and this time Blue Ridge defeated Brandywine 257–188 to win the Division 2 championship.

In 2017, Blue Ridge qualified for WFTDA Division 1 Playoffs, ranked at 33 overall on June 30, however they declined their invitation to Playoffs. In 2018, Blue Ridge qualified for the WFTDA North American East Continental Cup held in Kalamazoo, Michigan as the fourth seed, but after losing their quarterfinal to Team United Roller Derby finished the weekend in the consolation round.

=== Rankings ===
Season	Final ranking	Playoffs	Championship
2012	12 SC	DNQ	DNQ
2013	53 WFTDA	2 D2	3 D2
2014	53 WFTDA	10 D1	DNQ
2015	73 WFTDA	DNQ	DNQ
2016	38 WFTDA	2 D2	1 D2
2017	34 WFTDA	DNP D1	DNQ
2018	44 WFTDA	CR CC NA East	NA

- CR = consolation round

== In the community ==
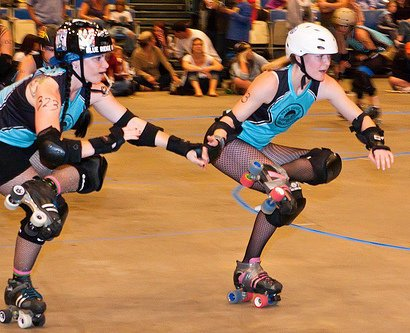
Blue Ridge Rollergirls warming up for a bout doing yoga on skates.

The league fosters community outreach and gives a portion of the proceeds of each bout to a western North Carolina charity. Charities supported include The Animal Compassion Network, Care Partners Children's Fund, Skye, RAINN, and Interlace. In 2016 and 2017 the league worked with Brother Wolf assisting with their annual Drag Queen Bingo which helps to raise money for the local animal shelter. The league also participates in community events such as the Asheville Holiday Parade, Women and Girls in Sports Day, and Walk A Mile Asheville hosted by Our Voice.

The league currently practices three times a week at Sk8t Depot in Hendersonville, NC and is currently seeking a practice space and venue to host home games in Asheville, NC. The league used to practice at Tarwheels Skate Way in Asheville before it closed in the summer of 2015. The league has no scheduled home games in the 2018 season as they seek a new venue the league has held games at both the Ag. Center and the U.S. Cellular Center in the past. The past few seasons have been heavy travel seasons for both the All Star's and the French Broad's competing in games and tournaments all over the country. The teams prepares for games with acupuncture sessions, and features synchronized yoga on skates during its warmup laps. Skaters also cross train with sponsors at Beer City Crossfit and Anytime Fitness.

Preceded by Sacred City Derby Girls	WFTDA Division 2 Championship winners 2016	Succeeded by Boston Roller Derby
