= Paradise City Roller Derby =

Roller derby league

- Metro area: Burleigh, Queensland
- Country: Australia
- Founded: 2013
- Dissolved: 2017
- Teams: All Stars (A team); Lightning (B team)
- Track type: Flat
- Affiliations: Skate Australia, WFTDA
- Website: www.paradisecityrollerderby.com

Paradise City Roller Derby was a women's flat track roller derby league based in Burleigh, Queensland, Australia. Founded in 2013, the league consisted of two teams, which competed against teams from other leagues, and was a member of the Women's Flat Track Derby Association (WFTDA). 2017 was the league's last active year.

The league was founded in 2013, spending its first years training at the Police Citizens Youth Club in Nerang, before being asked to relocate for fear of damaging its floors from skating on it. Paradise City hosted the Royal Rumble tournament at Carrara Indoor Stadium, and was considered a favourite after defeating Sydney Roller Derby League the week before. Paradise City finished in second place to Sun State Roller Girls, losing the final 235-122. By 2016, the league's All Star squad was ranked third in Australia and 65th overall. In April 2016, Paradise City again hosted Royal Rumble, billed as the year's biggest Asia-Pacific roller derby tournament in Australia, at the Runway Bay Indoor Stadium with 18 teams competing. By the end of 2017, the league's WFTDA ranking had dropped to 327.

== WFTDA ==
In January 2014, Paradise City was accepted as a member of the Women's Flat Track Derby Association Apprentice Program. On 2 October 2014, Paradise City was made a full member of the WFTDA. Paradise City debuted in the WFTDA Rankings at 66th overall in June 2015. In 2016, Paradise City competed at the Brew Ha-Ha tournament in Milwaukee, Wisconsin, and went 2-1 on the weekend, losing to Calgary Roller Derby Association 168-155, but defeating Bear City Roller Derby of Berlin 201-144, and the hosts Brewcity Bruisers 229-115. When the June 2016 WFTDA rankings were released, Paradise City was ranked at 54th overall, which qualified them for Division 2 Playoffs, however Paradise City was one of two leagues to not attend Playoffs in North America, allowing #61 Grand Raggidy Roller Girls and #62 Carolina Rollergirls to take part.

=== Rankings ===
Season	Final ranking	Playoffs	Championship
2015	66 WFTDA	DNQ	DNQ
2016	57 WFTDA	DNP D2	DNQ
2017	337 WFTDA	DNQ	DNQ
