= SCDC =

SCDC may refer to:

- South Cambridgeshire District Council
- South Carolina Department of Corrections
- Super Coupe du Congo (Republic of Congo)
- St. Chux Derby Chix
- Swarthmore Coalition for the Digital Commons, now Students for Free Culture
- An abbreviation used in Scitron Digital Contents products
