= Charlotte Roller Derby =

Roller derby league in North Carolina, US

- Charlotte Roller Derby's new logo as of 2018
- Metro area: Charlotte, North Carolina
- Country: United States
- Founded: 2006
- Teams: All-Stars (A Team) "B-Dazzlers" (B Team); Charlotte Juniors (Co-ed Youth Team); Intraleague Home Teams: NoDa Narwhals; Ballantyne Bombers; South End Sirens
- Track type(s): Flat Track
- Venue: Grady Cole Center; Kate's Skating Rink
- Affiliations: WFTDA
- Website: charlotterollerderby.org

Charlotte Roller Derby (CLTRD), formerly Charlotte Roller Girls, is a women's flat track roller derby league based in Charlotte, North Carolina, operating as a 501(c)3 non-profit organization. Founded in 2006, Charlotte Roller Derby is a member of the Women's Flat Track Derby Association (WFTDA). Charlotte Roller Derby consists of two travel teams, three local home teams, and one co-ed youth team.

Adult travel teams consist of the "Charlotte All-Stars" representing the league internationally in competition and B team Charlotte's "B-Dazzlers".

Three adult local home teams play only in Charlotte, NC and surrounding areas and consists of the "NoDa Narwhals", "Ballantyne Bombers" and "South End Sirens".

CLTRD's co-ed junior roller derby team, "Charlotte Junior Roller Derby" consists of kids ages 10–17 years old and is a member of the Junior Roller Derby Association (JRDA).

== History ==
The Charlotte Roller Girls were founded in 2006 as a skater-owned and operated league. On September 2, 2007, the league faced Palmetto State Roller Derby in its first bout. A total of five bouts were held in 2007 and Charlotte closed out its first season with a 2–3 record.

After competing on the road in 2007, on January 27, 2008, the Charlotte Roller Girls took on the Columbia Quadsquad in Charlotte's first home bout, at then-named Cricket Arena in Charlotte. A crowd of 1,000 was anticipated yet roughly 2,100 fans attended.

In 2008, league membership tripled and home bouts enjoyed an average attendance of 1,400 fans. In August, the Block'em Sock'em Rollers and the Cockpit Candies were formed to allow for intra-league competition. The group skated under the Charlotte Roller Girls name for interleague competition. Charlotte ended the season with an interleague record of 6–3.

The 2009 season brought continued growth to the league. For interleague competition, CLTRD fielded two teams - Charlotte Roller Girls All-Stars and Charlotte Roller Girls B Dazzlers. The intra-league teams are the Block'em Sock'em Rollers, Cockpit Candies and Fraid Knots.

In April, 2010, the Charlotte Roller Girls were accepted into the Women's Flat Track Derby Association Apprentice Program. Charlotte's membership in WFTDA was announced in June 2011, initially as part of the WFTDA's East Region.

In August, 2010, the league moved from their practice space in Gastonia, North Carolina to a new practice space in the NoDa neighborhood in Charlotte.

In 2013, the Charlotte All-Stars became a WFTDA Division 2 team, moving up to one of the top 100 ranked WFTDA leagues internationally.

== WFTDA rankings ==
Season	Final ranking	Playoffs	Championship
2011	25 E	DNQ	DNQ
2012	30 E	DNQ	DNQ
2013	95 WFTDA	DNQ	DNQ
2014	93 WFTDA	DNQ	DNQ
2015	106 WFTDA	DNQ	DNQ
2016	146 WFTDA	DNQ	DNQ
2017	168 WFTDA	DNQ	DNQ
2018	171 WFTDA	DNQ	DNQ
