= Sacramento Roller Derby =

Roller derby league

- Metro area: Sacramento, CA
- Country: United States
- Founded: 2006
- Track type: Flat
- Venue: The Rink
- Affiliations: WFTDA
- Website: sacramentorollerderby.com

Sacramento Roller Derby is a women's flat track roller derby league based in Sacramento, California. Originally two separate leagues founded in 2006, Sac City Rollers and Sacred City Derby Girls, who mutually announced a pending merger in late 2017, and then on January 1, 2018, announced a rebrand of the merged organization as Sacramento Roller Derby. Sacramento is a member of the Women's Flat Track Derby Association (WFTDA).

== History and structure ==
Sac City Rollers was founded by two friends, Christine Galindo, known as "Devil Doll", and Nicole Kennedy, known as "Loco Coco". They saw the Rollergirls television show, and immediately decided to form a local league. Within a couple of months, it had sixty skaters, and it was playing bouts before the end of the year.

Meanwhile, Sacred City Derby Girls was founded in late 2006 by some former members of the Sac City Rollers. In October 2007, Sacred was accepted as a member of the Women's Flat Track Derby Association (WFTDA), announced by the WFTDA in December 2007. By 2010, the league was attracting an average of 850 fans to its intraleague bouts, while in 2011, Sac City had more than 100 skaters, and regularly sold out its 700-capacity venue.

Sac City was accepted into the Women's Flat Track Derby Association Apprentice Program in April 2011, and became a full member of the WFTDA in June 2012.

Sacred City served as the host league of a WFTDA Division 1 Playoff in 2014.

In October 2017, Sac City co-announced with Sacred City Derby Girls that both leagues would merge for 2018, to continue under a to-be-determined name. The announcement was signed by Director members of each league, and posted on each league's website and social media. The merged organization's new name of Sacramento Roller Derby was announced on January 1, 2018.

At the time of the merger with Sacred City, Sac City consisted of three teams which competed against teams from other leagues, the Capital Punishers (A team), Folsom Prison Bruisers (B team) and River City Regulators (C team), and a junior roller derby team for co-ed skaters aged 8–17. Also at the time of the merger, Sacred City consisted of two competitive travel teams, the Sacrificers and the Disciples, and three home teams, The Donna Party, Midtown Maulies, and The Roseville TrainWreckers.

== WFTDA competition as Sac City Rollers ==
Sac City logo

The Sac City Capital Punishers first qualified for WFTDA Playoffs in 2013 at the Division 2 tournament in Kalamazoo, Michigan, at which they finished in second place, losing the title game to Santa Cruz Derby Girls, 230-185. At that year's WFTDA Championships, Sac City lost the bronze medal game 215-188 to Blue Ridge Rollergirls to finish in fourth place at the Division 2 level. In 2014, Sac City qualified for Division 2 Playoffs again as they were ranked at 58 overall with the June 30 ranking, but declined their invitation (as did Sacred City Derby Girls that year) citing injuries and family obligations, which would have resulted in the team skating short. Sac City returned to Division 2 Playoffs in 2015 as the eighth seed and finished in seventh place by defeating Emerald City Roller Girls 199-184. At the 2016 Lansing Division 2 tournament, Sac City was the second seed but after a weekend of upsets finished in seventh place, defeating Cincinnati Rollergirls 220-174. Sac City was eligible for Division 2 Playoffs again in 2017, but declined their invitation to Playoffs for the second time.

=== Rankings ===
Season	Final ranking	Playoffs	Championship
2012	18 W	DNQ	DNQ
2013	40 WFTDA	2 D2	4 D2
2014	82 WFTDA	DNP D2	DNQ
2015	53 WFTDA	7 D2	DNQ
2016	54 WFTDA	8 D2	DNQ
2017	64 WFTDA	DNP D2	DNQ

== WFTDA competition as Sacred City ==
Sacred City logo

In 2010, Sacred City qualified for WFTDA Playoffs for the first time, hosting the WFTDA Western Regional Tournament at which they were the tenth seed, and ultimately finished in ninth place by defeating Duke City Derby 198-72. The following year, Sacred City improved their showing with a seventh place finish at Westerns, capped by a 140-105 victory over Jet City Rollergirls. Another seventh-place finish followed at the 2012 Westerns, with a narrow 147-146 victory over Angel City Derby Girls.

2013 brought the introduction of the Divisional system to replace Regional playoffs. Sacred City entered the Salem Division 1 tournament as the seventh seed, but following losses to Toronto Roller Derby and Victoria (sandwiching a rankings upset over Charm City, Sacred lost the seventh-place game to Boston Derby Dames 309-151 to finish in eighth place. Sacred City was chosen as the host league of one of the Division 1 tournaments for 2014, however the June 30 rankings for that year, which determine tournament seedings, placed Sacred City in Division 2 territory as the 45th team overall. Sacred City was one of two teams to decline their invitation to Division 2 Playoffs that year, citing the costs involved in traveling to the distant locations in their press release announcement.

In 2015, Sacred City again was ranked as a Division 2 team, and played at the Detroit tournament, at which they finished second overall, losing the final to Nashville Roller Girls 194-189. This earned Sacred City a trip to WFTDA Championships for the first time, at the Division 2 level, and in a rematch against Nashville Sacred City became the 2015 WFTDA Division 2 champions with a 211-163 victory. Sacred City returned to the Division 1 level in 2016, entering the Vancouver tournament as the seventh seed, and finished in eighth place after a 252-109 loss to Stockholm Roller Derby.

=== Rankings ===
Season	Final ranking	Playoffs	Championship
2008	5 W	DNQ	DNQ
2009	11 W	DNQ	DNQ
2010	8 W	9 W	DNQ
2011	7 W	7 W	DNQ
2012	7 W	7 W	DNQ
2013	33 WFTDA	8 D1	DNQ
2014	54 WFTDA	DNP D2	DNQ
2015	32 WFTDA	2 D2	1 D2
2016	47 WFTDA	8 D1	DNQ

Preceded by Detroit Derby Girls	WFTDA Division 2 Championship winners 2015 (Sacred City)	Succeeded by Blue Ridge Rollergirls
