= Fabulous Sin City Roller Derby =

Roller derby league

- Metro area: Las Vegas
- Country: United States
- Founded: 2005
- Teams: All-Stars (A team); Notorious VIP; Hoover Damned; Flying Aces; Atomic Stardust
- Track type(s): Flat
- Venue: Riviera (hotel and casino) Convention Center
- Affiliations: WFTDA
- Org. type: LLC
- Website: https://www.sincityrollerderby.org/

Fabulous Sin City Roller Derby or Sin City Roller Derby (SCRD), is a women's flat track roller derby league based in Las Vegas, Nevada. Founded in 2005, Sin City is a founding member of the Women's Flat Track Derby Association (WFTDA).

== History ==
Sin City began as the Las Vegas Neanderdolls in 2005, started by coaches Ivanna S. Pankin, owner of the online store Sin City Skates, and her partner Trish the Dish. Ivanna and Trish had played with the Arizona Roller Derby and finding no team in Las Vegas, created one. Shawna th'Dead was the first member of Neanderdolls. The Neanderdolls grew in membership and became a travel only team. In 2008 they changed to The Fabulous Sin City Roller Girls.

At that time, FSCRG consisted of four home teams and a travel team. The four Las Vegas-themed home teams were the Tommy Gun Terrors, The Notorious VIP, Hoover Damned, and the Flying Aces.

As of January 2024, the WFTDA league is now named Sin City Roller Derby and has over 100 active members and volunteers. After the revival of SCRD home teams in 2024, SCRD now has a total of 6 teams, this includes their two travel teams and four home teams- The Flying Aces, The Hoover Damned, The Notorious VIP, and Atomic Stardust.

SCRD plays year-round, with the exception of the month of December.

== Teams ==
The Sin City Roller Derby league is composed of an A and a B travel team (Ace of Spades and Bad Beats respectively) and four home teams. The four home teams are, the Notorious VIP, the Hoover Damned, The Flying Aces, and Atomic Stardust.

== WFTDA competition ==
Sin City competed at the first WFTDA Championships, the "Dust Devil" tournament, in 2006, where they finished in 12th place. In 2007, the WFTDA began hosting Regional playoffs to qualify for Championships, and at the first WFTDA Western Regional Tournament, Sin City won their opening round bout against Rose City Rollers or Portland, 95-92, but lost their second round bout to the Texas Rollergirls of Austin, Texas, 121-49.

In 2013, Sin City returned to WFTDA Playoff competition, at the newly created Division 2 level, entering the tournament in Des Moines as the top seed. After opening their weekend with a 299-95 victory over Dallas Derby Devils, Sin City lost their semifinal to Jet City Rollergirls of Everett, Washington, 218-131, and then dropped the third-place game to Treasure Valley Rollergirls of Boise, 184-142 to finish in fourth place. In 2014, Sin City returned to Division 2 Playoffs as the fifth seed in Duluth, Minnesota, winning their opening game against Brewcity Bruisers of Milwaukee, 194-141. Sin City followed this win by taking their semifinal against St. Chux Derby Chix 174-141 to secure a spot in the tournament final. Sin City lost the final to Detroit Derby Girls 318-106 to finish second. The second-place finish at Duluth qualified Sin City for the Division 2 third-place game at WFTDA Championships in Nashville that year, which they lost in a close 164-163 result to Bear City of Berlin.

=== WFTDA rankings ===
Season	Final ranking	Playoffs	Championship
2006	11 WFTDA	—	12
2007	17 WFTDA	R2 W	DNQ
2008	N/R	DNQ	DNQ
2009	15 SC	DNQ	DNQ
2010	21 SC	DNQ	DNQ
2011	19 SC	DNQ	DNQ
2012	15 SC	DNQ	DNQ
2013	47 WFTDA	4 D2	DNQ
2014	49 WFTDA	2 D2	4 D2
2015	69 WFTDA	DNQ	DNQ
2016	119 WFTDA	DNQ	DNQ
2017	158 WFTDA	DNQ	DNQ
2018	319 WFTDA	DNQ	DNQ
