= Nidaros Roller Derby =

Norwegian women's roller derby league

- Metro area: Trondheim
- Country: Norway
- Founded: 2010
- Teams: All-Stars (A team); Killer B's (B team)
- Track type: Flat
- Venue: Husebyhallen
- Affiliations: WFTDA
- Website: www.nidarosrollerderby.no

Nidaros Roller Derby (NRD) is a women's flat-track roller derby league based in Trondheim, Norway. Founded in 2010, Nidaros Roller Derby is a member of the Women's Flat Track Derby Association (WFTDA).

== History ==
Nidaros was the first roller derby league in Norway, founded in August 2010, and had more than thirty skaters by November. By late 2011, it was one of three roller derby leagues in Norway, and was a finalist in the national "Klubben i mitt hjerte" (club in my heart) competition.

In October 2012, Nidaros was accepted as a member of the Women's Flat Track Derby Association Apprentice Programme, and it became a full WFTDA member in September 2013. Nidaros has two teams, an A and a B team, which play teams from other leagues.

== WFTDA competition ==
In 2016, Nidaros became the first team from Norway to qualify for WFTDA Playoffs, placed in the Division 2 Playoff in Lansing, Michigan. At Lansing, Nidaros lost their first two games to Wasatch Roller Derby (Salt Lake City, Utah) and Tri-City Roller Derby (Kitchener, Ontario), before defeating Grand Raggidy Roller Girls (Grand Rapids, Michigan) 168–137 to finish in ninth place.

=== Rankings ===
Season	Final ranking	Playoffs	Championship
2013	NR	DNQ	DNQ
2014	147 WFTDA	DNQ	DNQ
2015	85 WFTDA	DNQ	DNQ
2016	59 WFTDA	9 D2	DNQ
2017	80 WFTDA	DNQ	DNQ
