= Demolition City Roller Derby =

Roller derby league in Indiana, US

- Metro area: Evansville, Indiana
- Country: United States
- Founded: January 2007
- Teams: Dynamite Dolls (A team); Destruction Dames (B team)
- Track type: Flat
- Venue: Soldiers and Sailors Memorial Coliseum
- Affiliations: WFTDA
- Org. type: LLC
- Website: demolitioncityrollerderby.com

Demolition City Roller Derby (DCRD) is a women's flat-track roller derby league in Evansville, Indiana, and is a member of the Women's Flat Track Derby Association (WFTDA).

== History and organization ==
DCRD became Evansville's first flat-track roller derby league in January 2007. Since then DCRD has established itself as a non-profit league and is skater-owned and managed. DCRD has contributed over $16,000 to local charities and non-profit agencies as well as volunteered for organizations such as Habitat for Humanity, Easter Seals, CJ's Bus, Indiana Blood Center and more. In June 2010, DCRD was granted membership into the North Central Region of the Women's Flat Track Derby Association (WFTDA). After the region system was dissolved in favor of overall rankings, Demolition City was placed in Division 2.

In September 2014, Demolition City hosted Women's Flat Track Derby Association (WFTDA) Division 1 International playoffs, at the Ford Center, featuring teams from the United States, England and Canada. In honor of the event, Evansville mayor Lloyd Winnecke declared the week of the event to be "Roller Derby Week" in the city.

DCRD has over 35 active skaters and consists of two interleague travel teams that compete with other leagues from around the Midwest and beyond: the All-Star Dynamite Dolls, and the B team Destruction Dames.

DCRD's venue is at the historic Soldiers and Sailors Memorial Coliseum in downtown Evansville, Indiana.

== WFTDA competition ==
Demolition City first qualified for WFTDA Playoffs as the eighth seed at the 2014 Division 2 tournament in Kitchener-Waterloo, Ontario, losing their opening game to Bear City Roller Derby, 180–177. The Dynamite Dolls bounced back with a 194–183 win against the Boulder County Bombers, but then lost to Queen City Roller Girls, 188–174. Demolition City then fell to Chicago Outfit Roller Derby 189–150 in their final game, and finished in eighth place.

In 2015, Demolition City was the fifth seed at the Division 2 Playoff in Cleveland, and finished in second place, qualifying for an appearance at that year's WFTDA Championships at the Division 2 level. At Champs in Saint Paul, Minnesota, Demolition City lost their first game to Nashville Rollergirls, 232–91. Demolition City then faced Kansas City Roller Warriors, to whom they had lost the Cleveland final, and won the rematch 149–139 to finish in third place.

=== Rankings ===
Season	Final ranking	Playoffs	Championship
2011	22 NC	DNQ	DNQ
2012	22 NC	DNQ	DNQ
2013	75 WFTDA	DNQ	DNQ
2014	39 WFTDA	8 D2	DNQ
2015	30 WFTDA	2 D2	3 D2
2016	218 WFTDA	DNQ	DNQ
2017	178 WFTDA	DNQ	DNQ

== See also ==
- Sports in Evansville
