= Queen City Roller Derby =

Roller derby league

- Metro area: Buffalo, New York
- Country: United States
- Founded: 2006
- Teams: Travel teams: Lake Effect Furies (A); Subzero Sirens (B); Home teams: Alley Kats; Devil Dollies; Saucies
- Track type: Flat
- Venue: Buffalo RiverWorks
- Affiliations: WFTDA
- Org. type: LLC
- Website: https://www.qcrg.net/

Queen City Roller Derby or QCRD, is the flat-track roller derby league based in Buffalo, New York. Founded as Queen City Roller Derby in 2006, the league is scheduled to play its twentieth season in 2026. QCRD is a member of the Women's Flat Track Derby Association (WFTDA). Since 2016, Queen City plays home games at Buffalo RiverWorks on the city's waterfront, drawing upwards of 1,000 fans to events, with the home-team season typically running from January through June. The facility at RiverWorks is a private development that includes a purpose-built flat track for roller derby, and is credited for helping the league sell over 10,000 tickets in the 2016 season. During the 2019 season, Queen City changed its name to Queen City Roller Derby to represent the league's inclusiveness of all people.

== Teams ==
Queen City is currently composed of three home teams: the Alley Kats, the Devil Dollies and the Saucies. The Nickel City Knockouts, who won four consecutive home team championships starting in 2012, were retired after the 2015 season. The training team is the Queen's Court. The league also brought back a B-level travel development team in 2016, named the Subzero Sirens.

QCRD has an affiliated junior roller derby league, The Queen City Junior Roller Derby which comprises two teams, The Cereal Killers and The Atomic Bettys. The juniors also have an All-Star travel team.

== WFTDA competition ==
The All-Star travel team is the Lake Effect Furies. The Furies first qualified for WFTDA Playoffs in 2013, as the sixth seed at the Division 2 Playoffs in Kalamazoo, Michigan, where they placed 9th. In 2014, the Furies returned to Division 2 Playoffs, this time in Kitchener-Waterloo, Ontario, entering as the second seed and ultimately coming in 5th place. In 2015, Queen City made their first trip to Division 1 Playoffs at Omaha, Nebraska, which included a last-jam upset victory over Toronto Roller Derby, 232-229. The Furies entered the weekend as the ninth seed and improved to eighth by Sunday. In 2016, Queen City returned for their second consecutive Division 1 Playoff, as the ninth seed in Vancouver, British Columbia, and finished the weekend in sixth. At the 2017 Division 1 Playoff in Dallas, Queen City won their opening game against Houston Roller Derby, but then lost their quarterfinal to Arch Rival Roller Derby. Queen City finished their weekend with a 270-77 consolation bracket win over Wasatch Roller Derby. At the 2018 WFTDA Playoffs in Atlanta, Queen City lost both its games, including a tight consolation round game to Bear City Roller Derby, 218-212.

=== Rankings ===
Season	Final ranking	Playoffs	Championship
2011	15 E	DNQ	DNQ
2012	13 E	DNQ	DNQ
2013	48 WFTDA	9 D2	DNQ
2014	36 WFTDA	5 D2	DNQ
2015	47 WFTDA	8 D1	DNQ
2016	27 WFTDA	6 D1	DNQ
2017	18 WFTDA	CR D1	DNQ
2018	24 WFTDA	CR	DNQ

- CR = consolation round
- no WFTDA rankings from 2020-2022 due to COVID-19 pandemic
