= Ivanna S. Pankin =

Personal information
- Birth name: Denise Grimes
- Nationality: American
- Born: 1969

Sport
- Sport: Roller derby
- Club: SoCal Derby

Achievements and titles
- National finals: Won Battle on the Bank Championship, 2009

Denise Grimes (born 1969), known as Ivanna S. Pankin, is a roller derby skater and organizer.

Grimes grew up in Phoenix, Arizona. She spent a large amount of her youth roller skating at a local rink, and watched RollerGames. She spent her twenties around the punk rock scene, playing in bands, and writing fanzines. Grimes graduated magna cum laude from the University of Arizona in Tucson with a bachelor's degree in Fine Art (painting) in 1997 and moved to Northern California. Although she never played sports outside of high school PE, she retained fond memories of roller derby, and signed up for the mailing list for the Bay City Bombers, a surviving banked track league, albeit one with no scheduled games.

While Grimes spent some time working as an artist in San Francisco, California, she moved back to Arizona around the turn of the millennium. While there, she adopted the name "Ivanna S. Pankin", for her musical performances. Inspired by an old poster for the Unholy Rollers movie, she founded Arizona Roller Derby (AZRD) in mid-2003. She recruited skaters through local advertisements, and did not initially have a clear plan as to how the league would train or play, instead expecting that the team would work out these things together, an approach inspired by her background in the punk movement.

Although Grimes was not initially aware of the existence of other roller derby leagues, a neighbor introduced her to a friend who was involved in the Texas Rollergirls, and she persuaded a friend to start Tucson Roller Derby, these leagues forming much of the early impetus for the revival of the sport. In November 2003, she organised the first interleague bout in flat track roller derby, against the LA Derby Dolls, and she captained Arizona for its first bout against Texas. She was increasingly contacted by fledgling leagues elsewhere, providing ideas and guidance.

Through the sport, Pankin met Trish "The Dish" Ethier, who became a rival team captain, and the two became a couple. In 2005, Pankin and The Dish moved to Las Vegas, Nevada, where they founded the Sin City Rollergirls. They also organized the first Rollercon, a five-day event based around roller derby, which included a convention, bouts, and live music, Pankin attributing the initial appeal of the revived sport to the punk movement. With Ethier, she founded Sin City Skates, one of the first roller derby businesses.

In 2009, Pankin and The Dish moved to San Diego, California, where they joined the San Diego Derby Dolls. Pankin captained the team at the national banked track roller derby championship, the Battle on the Bank, and led it to victory. More recently, she and The Dish have coached and skated with SoCal Derby, while still running Sin City Skates. In 2016, Sin City Skates was sold to a new owner, so the pair can focus on running RollerCon.
