= Kaiser Permanente Arena =

Indoor arena in Santa Cruz, California

Coordinates: 36°58′07″N 122°01′25″W

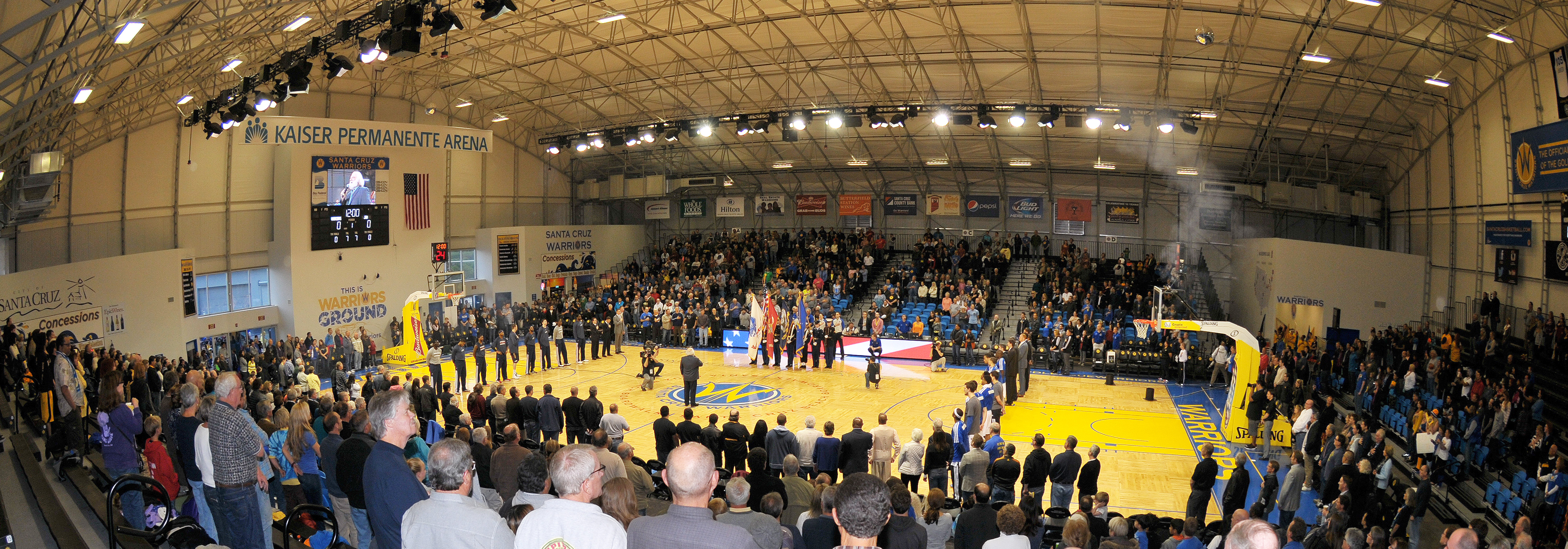
- Interior of Kaiser Permanente Arena

- Location within California Location within the United States
- Location: Santa Cruz, California, United States
- Capacity: 2,505

Construction
- Groundbreaking: September 18, 2012
- Opened: December 23, 2012
- Cost: $3.5 million
- Architect: Brown Reynolds Watford Architects

Tenants
- Santa Cruz Warriors (NBAGL) (2012–present); UC Santa Cruz Banana Slugs (NCAA DIII) (2013–present); Santa Cruz Derby Girls (WFTDA) (2013–2014)

Kaiser Permanente Arena is an indoor arena located in Santa Cruz, in the U.S. state of California. It has a seating capacity of 2,505 spectators. It hosts the Santa Cruz Warriors of the NBA G League. It was also the home of the Santa Cruz Derby Girls of the Women's Flat Track Derby Association in 2013 and 2014. The naming rights were bought by health care consortium Kaiser Permanente (KP) despite the company—a sponsor of the Warriors' owner, the NBA's Golden State Warriors—not having facilities in Santa Cruz at the time. KP has since opened medical facilities in Santa Cruz, Scotts Valley and Watsonville.

== History ==
A $3.5 million loan by the city of Santa Cruz was given to the Warriors to build their arena, with the 1.5-acre lot being provided by the Santa Cruz Seaside Company, owner of the Santa Cruz Beach Boardwalk. Construction ran for 78 days between September and December 2012, halted just a few times by rain. The arena was opened on December 23, 2012, with a victory by the Warriors against the Bakersfield Jam.

By April 2014, Kaiser Permanente Arena had 39 sell-outs out of the 53 Warriors home games. In the meantime, the Warriors reached two D-League finals. The arena has a seating capacity of 2,505.

The arena also served as the home of UC Santa Cruz men's and women's basketball games. In November 2017, UC Santa Cruz hosted a Thanksgiving basketball tournament at Kaiser Permanente Arena.

The United States men's national basketball team hosted their FIBA World Cup qualifying first-round games at Kaiser Permanente Arena on February 23, 2018, against Cuba and on February 26, 2018, against Puerto Rico.

Due to COVID restrictions on games in Santa Clara County, Stanford men's, Santa Clara men's, and the Stanford women's basketball teams played some games of the 2020–21 season at the arena.

The arena was used by Kaiser Permanente as a vaccination hub to distribute COVID-19 vaccines in 2021.

In 2022, the Santa Cruz Warriors broke their franchise record, selling out 110 straight games at KP Arena. Coming into the 2026-27 season, the sell-out streak is at 66 straight games.

Kaiser Permanente Arena has hosted multiple special events, like George Lopez, Melissa Etheridge, Willie Nelson, and various author events and speaker series. Additionally, KPA has been the home to local High School events, USA Gymnastics, Division 1 NCAA Basketball games, Brazilian jiu jitsu competitions, the Santa Cruz Derby Girls, tattoo expos, and the NBA G League Showcase. Some marquee events that were at Kaiser Permanente Arena multiple times are the Harlem Globetrotters (4) and Legacy Fighting Alliance (4). In each of these cases, the event sold out.

On September 26, 2026, World Elite Sumo came to KPA for the first ever professional sumo event in California. In addition to selling out, the event was a huge hit as local media rushed to cover it.
