= Calgary Roller Derby =

Canadian roller derby league

- Metro area: Calgary, Alberta
- Country: Canada
- Founded: 2006
- Teams: All-Stars (travel team); B-52 Bellas; Cut-Throat Car Hops; Thrashin' Lassies
- Track type(s): Flat
- Venue: Max Bell Arena; Triwood Arena
- Affiliations: WFTDA
- Website: www.calgaryrollerderby.com

Calgary Roller Derby is a not-for-profit women's flat-track roller derby league based in Calgary, Alberta, Canada. Calgary Roller Derby is a member of the Women's Flat Track Derby Association (WFTDA).

== History and structure ==
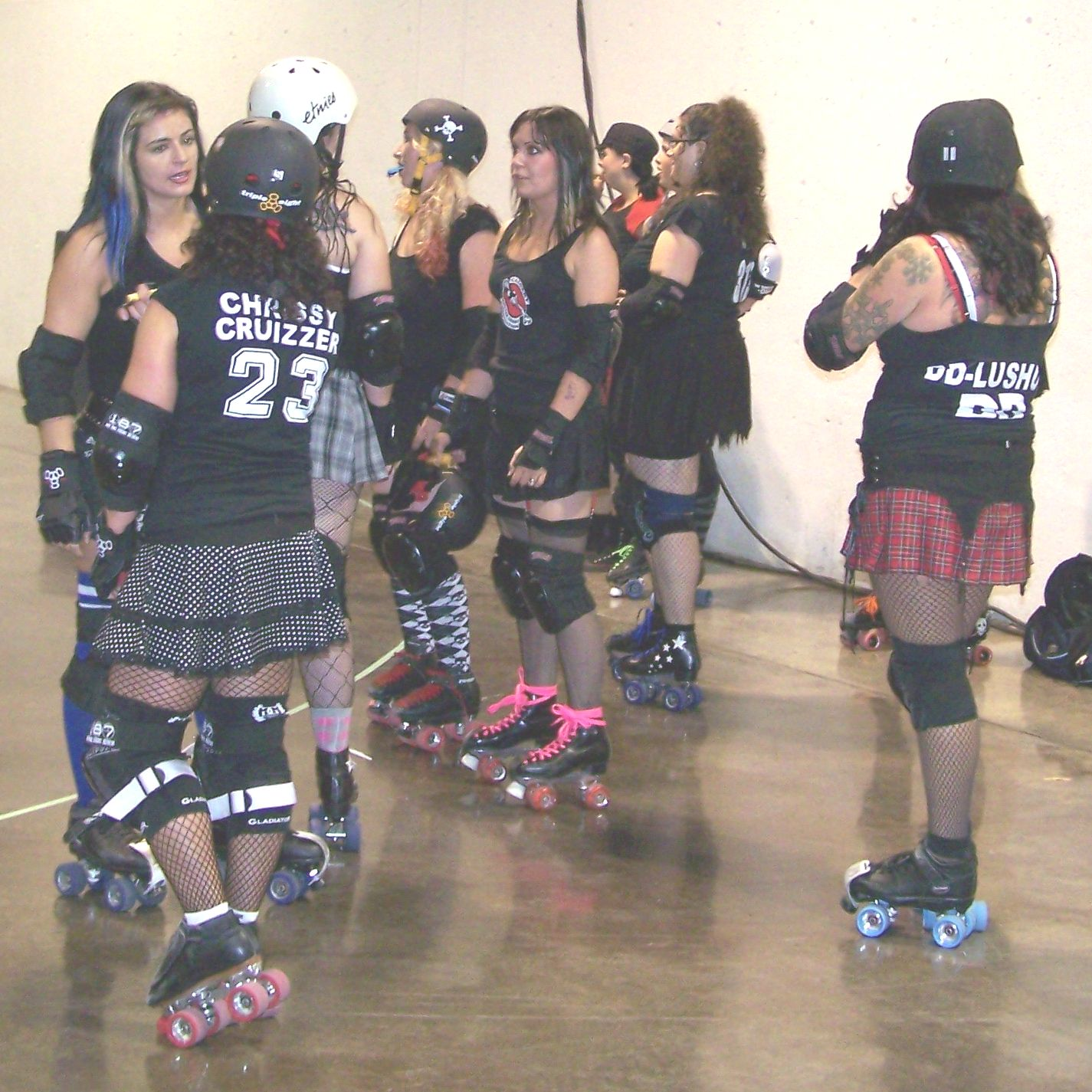
Some of the Roller Derby Girls at the 2007 Calgary Tattoo & Arts Festival

Former CRDA logo

Calgary Roller Derby was originally formed as the Sandstone City Roller Girls in 2006, and restructured as the Calgary Roller Derby Association the following year. The league is skater-owned and skater-operated and is a non-profit organization. In April 2018 the league announced a rebrand and dropped the "Association" from its name, and introduced an updated logo.

Currently, there are three home teams within the league: The Cut-Throat Car Hops, the Thrashin' Lassies, the B-52 Bellas. There are two travel teams: the Jane Deere (B team) and the All Stars (WFTDA charter travel team). The Hellion Rebellion were renamed the All Stars in 2012. The Jane Deere was defunct as of summer 2009 and reformed in 2016. Each of these teams has a roster of 14-20 skaters. There is also a Fresh Meat team of new skaters.

The league skates from April until September, at Triwood Arena, with charity and invitational scrimmages during the off-season. Skaters also frequently travel throughout the province to participate in invitational bouts.

The league was accepted into the WFTDA Apprentice Program in January 2013. CRD achieved full member status in the Women's Flat Track Derby Association (WFTDA) in December 2013, becoming the first full WFTDA member league in Alberta.

Calgary Junior Roller Derby is the league's JRDA-aligned junior roller derby league.

== WFTDA competition ==
Calgary first qualified for WFTDA Playoffs in 2016, entering the Division 2 tournament in Lansing, Michigan as the fifth seed. At Lansing, Calgary upset higher-seeded Cincinnati Rollergirls, Charm City Roller Girls (Baltimore) and ultimately defeated the seventh-seeded Charlottesville Derby Dames 189–165 to take first place in the tournament. The victory qualified Calgary for the Division 2 side of WFTDA Championships. At Championships in Portland, Calgary lost their opening game against the Blue Ridge Rollergirls 225–183, but then won a rematch against Charlottesville 252–197 to take third place in Division 2. In 2017, Calgary made their first appearance at Division 1 Playoffs at Malmö, but lost to both Rainy City Roller Derby and Helsinki Roller Derby to finish out of the medal round.

=== Rankings ===
Season	Final ranking	Playoffs	Championship
2014	58 WFTDA	DNQ	DNQ
2015	62 WFTDA	DNQ	DNQ
2016	42 WFTDA	1 D2	3 D2
2017	56 WFTDA	CR D1	DNQ

- CR = consolation round
