= RollerCon =

RollerCon is a five-day convention, held yearly in Las Vegas for members of the roller derby community.

The convention was first held in 2005 and is organized by skaters Ivanna S. Pankin and Trish the Dish.
