= Akron Roller Derby =

Flat track roller derby league

- Metro area: Akron, Ohio
- Country: United States
- Founded: 2016
- Teams: All Stars (A team); AK Rowdy Rollers (B team)
- Track type: Flat
- Venue: Summit County Fairgrounds Arena Complex
- Affiliations: WFTDA; Northeast Ohio Women's Sports Alliance
- Org. type: 501(c)(3)
- Website: www.akronrollerderby.net

Akron Roller Derby is a women's flat track roller derby league based in Akron, Ohio. Two separate Akron-based leagues, NEO Roller Derby and Rubber City Rollergirls, merged in November 2016 to become Akron Roller Derby. The league consists of two teams which compete against teams from other leagues, and is a member of the Women's Flat Track Derby Association (WFTDA).

== History ==
Former NEO Roller Derby logo

Akron's original roller derby league was founded in June 2006 by Mary Elliott. The Rubber City Demolition Dolls were featured in the Akron Beacon Journal on May 27, 2007. Shortly after, Elliott bowed out but the original league stayed intact. Elliott kept rights to the Rubber City name for derby use. NEO Roller Derby was founded as the Northeast Ohio Rock 'n' Roller Girls a group of eleven women from RCDD. The Rock 'n' Roller Girls name was later reserved for the league's A team. The league attracted attention for raising money for charities including Stewart's Caring Place and the American Red Cross.

Former Rubber City Rollergirls logo

Meanwhile, Rubber City Rollergirls was founded in Akron in 2008 after receiving permission from Elliott to use the reformed name, and played its first bout, at the John S. Knight Center, in April 2009. The league was accepted into the Women's Flat Track Derby Association Apprentice Program in January 2010, and instituted its B team later in the year. By 2011, it had forty skaters, and was claiming crowds of 1,000 fans. Its A team was known as the Tire Iron Maidens, and its B team was the Hot Rod Dollies. Rubber City at some point left the Apprentice program, and was not listed as such in February 2013. In October 2014, Rubber City re-entered the Apprentice Program.

In November 2016, NEO Roller Derby and Rubber City Rollergirls announced on their social media pages, in a statement confirmed by a new, mutual website, that the leagues had merged to become Akron Roller Derby.

== WFTDA ==
NEO was accepted into the Women's Flat Track Derby Association Apprentice Program in September 2009, and became a full member of the WFTDA in September 2010. By 2011, the league had almost forty skaters, and was attracting crowds averaging 600 people.

In 2013, NEO qualified for the WFTDA Division 2 International Playoffs for the first time, competing at the tournament held in Kalamazoo, Michigan that August. NEO finished the tournament in 4th place, losing the 3rd place game to host team, the Kalamazoo Derby Darlins, 250-219.

Currently AKRD is a member of WFTDA's NA Northeast regional division.

== WFTDA rankings ==
=== As NEO Roller Derby ===
Season	Final ranking	Playoffs	Championship
2011	23 NC	DNQ	DNQ
2012	19 NC	DNQ	DNQ
2013	51 WFTDA	4 D2	DNQ
2014	87 WFTDA	DNQ	DNQ
2015	126 WFTDA	DNQ	DNQ

=== As Akron Roller Derby All Stars ===
Season	Final ranking	Playoffs	Championship
2016	164 WFTDA	DNQ	DNQ
2017	135 WFTDA	DNQ	DNQ
2018	169 WFTDA	DNQ	DNQ
2019	145 WFTDA	DNQ	DNQ
2023-2024	55 NA Northeast	DNQ	DNQ

=== AK Rowdy Rollers (B Team) ===
Season	Final ranking	Playoffs	Championship
2023-2024	126 NA Northeast	DNQ	DNQ
