= Wasatch Roller Derby =

Women's roller derby league in Salt Lake City, Utah, USA

- Metro area: Salt Lake City, UT
- Country: United States
- Founded: 2008
- Teams: Midnight Terror (A team); Black Diamond Divas; Hot Wheelers
- Track type: Flat
- Venue: Derby Depot
- Affiliations: WFTDA
- Website: wasatchrollerderby.org

Wasatch Roller Derby (WRD) is a women's flat track roller derby league based in Salt Lake City, Utah. Founded in 2008, Wasatch is a member of the Women's Flat Track Derby Association (WFTDA).

== History and organization ==
Originally emerging from the Salt City Derby Girls, the league's formation was led by Lacey "Honey" Peterson and Brandi "Medusa" Olsen. The first public Wasatch bout was held April 25, 2009 at Hollywood Connection in West Valley City.

Wasatch joined the WFTDA Apprentice Program in October 2009, and were accepted as full WFTDA members in June 2010. By January 2012, they were described as the biggest league in Salt Lake City. In 2013 the WFTDA transitioned from a region based ranking system to an overall ranking system. WRD entered the new ranking at 20th in March 2013.

The league founded the Wasatch Junior Rollers, a junior roller derby team, and have close links with the co-ed MRDA league, Wasatch Men's Roller Derby. As of 2019, Wasatch Roller Derby features two home teams and one travel team.

Wasatch Roller Derby regularly raises funds for charitable organizations including the March of Dimes and the American Diabetes Association.

== WFTDA competition ==
Wasatch first qualified for WFTDA Playoffs in 2012, as the ninth seed at the WFTDA Western Regional Tournament, where they finished in ninth place by defeating Arizona Roller Derby 245–134.

In 2013, the WFTDA restructured its playoff system, and Wasatch qualified for Division 1 Playoffs in Fort Wayne, Indiana as the seventh seed, and finished in seventh place by beating Cincinnati Rollergirls 275–95.

In 2014, Wasatch hosted a Division 1 Playoff at the Salt Palace. WRD competed at the tournament as the eighth seed and finished in eighth place after losing to No Coast Derby Girls 169–166. No Coast had been the intended host league but their venue plans fell through.

In 2015, Wasatch dropped down to Division 2 Playoffs as the fifth seed at Detroit, and finished in fifth place by defeating Bear City 203–152.

In 2016, Wasatch was the third seed for the Lansing Division 2 Playoff, and just missed the bronze medal with a 197–194 loss to Charm City Rollergirls.

Wasatch returned to Division 1 Playoffs in 2017 as the twelfth seed in Dallas, but lost both of their games, 415–68 to Atlanta Rollergirls and 270–77 to Queen City Roller Girls.

=== Rankings ===
Season	Final ranking	Playoffs
2011	17 W	DNQ
2012	9 W	9 W
2013	23 WFTDA	7 D1
2014	33 WFTDA	8 D1
2015	52 WFTDA	5 D2
2016	51 WFTDA	3 D2
2017	57 WFTDA	CR D1
2018	81 WFTDA	DNQ
2019	81 WFTDA	

- CR = consolation round
