= SoCal Derby =

Roller derby league

- Metro area: San Diego, California
- Country: United States
- Founded: 2011
- Teams: The Kraken (A team); The Cuttlefish (B team)
- Track type: Flat
- Venue: Skate San Diego
- Affiliations: WFTDA
- Website: socalderby.com

SoCal Derby is a women's flat track roller derby league in San Diego, California. The league has two teams which play teams from other leagues, and is a member of the Women's Flat Track Derby Association (WFTDA).

== History ==
The league was founded in 2011 by Ivanna S. Pankin and Trish The Dish.

"#1 Armed Bandit", a skater with SoCal, was selected to play for Team Scotland at the 2011 Roller Derby World Cup.

SoCal Derby was accepted into the Women's Flat Track Derby Association Apprentice Program in January 2012, and graduated to full WFTDA membership in December 2012.

In 2014, SoCal Derby partnered with South Coast Derby. The two small leagues provisionally merged business operations, leadership boards and practice calendars, but ultimately disconnected in 2015.

After a year long game hiatus, SoCal Derby announced a partnership in December 2015 with local Roller Derby Coalition of Leagues (RDCL) banked track league San Diego Derby Dolls to share a facility and create the first coalition between a banked and flat track league under one roof in modern roller derby.

== WFTDA competition ==
The SoCal charter team, the Kraken, rose from unranked in their first full membership season to rank #38 and received an invitation to the WFTDA Division 1 Playoffs in 2014. The tenth seed in Charleston, SoCal lost their first two games to Mad Rollin' Dolls and Naptown Roller Girls, putting them in the tenth place game, which they lost 183-133 to Jet City Rollergirls to finish the tournament in tenth place.

=== Rankings ===
| Season | Final ranking | Playoffs | Championship |
|---|---|---|---|
| 2013 | 61 WFTDA | DNQ | DNQ |
| 2014 | 43 WFTDA | 10 D1 | DNQ |
| 2015 | dormant | DNQ | DNQ |
| 2016 | 103 WFTDA | DNQ | DNQ |
