= Emerald City Roller Derby =

Roller derby league

- Metro area: Eugene, OR
- Country: United States
- Founded: 2007
- Track type: Flat
- Venue: Bob Keefer Center for Sports and Recreation
- Affiliations: WFTDA
- Org. type: Nonprofit
- Website: emeraldcityrd.org

Emerald City Roller Derby (ECRD), formerly known as Emerald City Roller Girls, is a roller derby league based in Eugene, Oregon.

== History ==
Founded in 2007 as the Emerald City Roller Girls, the league once consisted of three teams and a mixed team which competed against teams from other leagues.

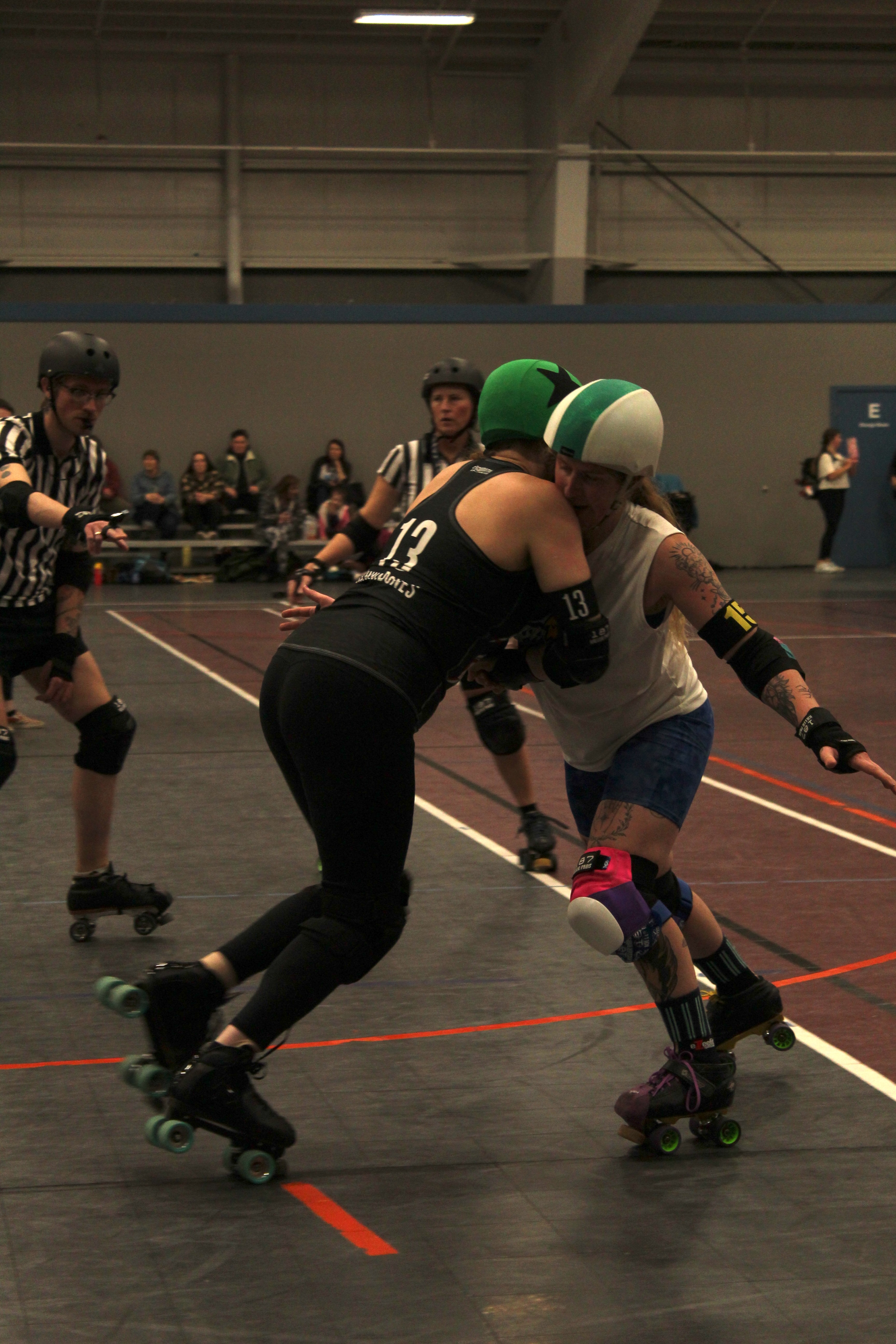
League members during a scrimmage

ECRD was founded in January 2007 by a group of people who met through a knitting circle, and a posting on Craigslist. By January 2010, the league had around 80 skaters.

In the spring of 2016, the league changed its name to Emerald City Roller Derby to promote inclusivity and community.

Emerald City Junior Derby, formerly the Junior Gems, junior roller derby league is an offshoot of ECRD.

== WFTDA competition ==
Season	Final Ranking	Regionals	Championship
2010	14 West	DNQ	DNQ
2011	12 West	DNQ	DNQ
2012	No found data	DNQ	DNQ
2013	91 WFTDA	DNQ	DNQ
2014	95 WFTDA	DNQ	DNQ
2015	48 WFTDA	DNQ	DNQ
2016	98 WFTDA	DNQ	DNQ
2017	160 WFTDA	DNQ	DNQ
2018	173 WFTDA	DNQ	DNQ
2019	248 WFTDA	DNQ	DNQ
2023	NR NA West	DNQ	DNQ
2024	NR NA West	DNQ	DNQ
