= Lowcountry Highrollers =

Roller derby league

- Metro area: Charleston, SC
- Country: United States
- Founded: 2008
- Teams: LCHR All-Stars (A team); Bruisin' Betties (B team); Ashley Riverdolls; Holy City Heartbreakers; Swamp Foxes
- Track type(s): Flat
- Venue: Indoor Sports of the Lowcountry
- Affiliations: WFTDA
- Org. type: LLC
- Website: www.lowcountryhighrollers.com

Lowcountry Highrollers is a women's flat-track roller derby league in Charleston, South Carolina. Founded in 2008, the league comprises over 30 active skaters, referees, and non-skating officials as of 2019. The Lowcountry Highrollers roller derby league is a 501(c)3 non-profit organization and member league of the Women's Flat Track Derby Association (WFTDA).

== History and organization ==
In January 2008, the founding members of the Lowcountry Highrollers made their first contact with a Craigslist ad. On March 22, 2009, the Lowcountry Highrollers had their first game. It was held at the Omar Shrine Temple and was sold out.

In January 2010, LCHR formed a second travel team, the Bruisin’ Betties. Their first bout was January 23, 2010. On April 18, 2010, LCHR debuted their newly formed home teams, the Holy City Heartbreakers and the Swamp Foxes. The Holy City Heartbreakers defeated the Swamp Foxes in the first LCHR home team bout. On April 24, 2010, LCHR became the #2 roller derby league in the state of South Carolina by defeating the Richland County Regulators.

The third LCHR home team, the Ashley Riverdolls, was formed in 2011. In January 2011, LCHR entered the Women's Flat Track Derby Association Apprentice Program, and also began a junior roller derby league for skaters between the ages of 12 and 17. On February 13, 2011, LCHR hosted their first home game of 2011 with over 2,500 fans in the seats. In November, LCHR began a recreational team, and on December 1, 2011, LCHR became the first Women's Flat Track Derby Association league in the state of South Carolina. Lowcountry finished 2011 with a record of 9 wins and 1 loss. In the South Carolina State Championships, they finished second in the state.

In 2012, the LCHR All-Stars travel team finished the season with a record of 5 wins and 4 losses, while the Bruisin' Betties B team finished with a record of 5 wins and 5 losses. Although the Ashley Riverdolls won the most home team bouts this season, the Holy City Heartbreakers won the final championship tournament.

As a business enterprise, the league is registered as a Limited Liability Corporation. Lowcountry Highrollers donate a portion of bout proceeds to a different local charity.

== WFTDA rankings ==
Season	Final ranking	Playoffs	Championship
2012	29 E	DNQ	DNQ
2013	82 WFTDA	DNQ	DNQ
2014	123 WFTDA	DNQ	DNQ
2015	117 WFTDA	DNQ	DNQ
2016	153 WFTDA	DNQ	DNQ
2017	208 WFTDA	DNQ	DNQ
2018	245 WFTDA	DNQ	DNQ

== In media ==
LCHR's first article was written by the Charleston City Paper. A collection of coverage was produced by TheDigitel.

The Lowcountry Highrollers logo artwork was designed by Hook Advertising.
