= Kalamazoo Roller Derby =

Roller derby league

- Metro area: Kalamazoo, MI
- Country: United States
- Founded: 2006
- Teams: Kill Stars (A team); Killa Crew (B team)
- Track type: Flat
- Venue: Wings Stadium
- Affiliations: WFTDA
- Website: www.kalamazooderby.com

Kalamazoo Roller Derby (KRD) is a women's flat track roller derby league based in Kalamazoo, Michigan. Founded in 2006, the league consists of two teams which compete against teams from other leagues, and is a member of the Women's Flat Track Derby Association (WFTDA).

== History and organization ==
Former KDD logo

The league was founded in early 2006 as the Kalamazoo Kamikazes, and played its first bout the following year.

By 2008 they had rebranded as the Killmazoo Derby Darlins and moved from the RollerWorld roller rink to Wings Stadium where they sold out all 800 advance tickets for a June game. It doubled its membership in 2009, following the release of the movie Whip It!.

Killamazoo was accepted into the Women's Flat Track Derby Association Apprentice Program in October 2009, and became a full member of the WFTDA in September 2010.

The league plays its bouts at the Wings Stadium, and aims in particular to attract families to watch.

In January 2018 the league announced a rebrand as Kalamazoo Derby Darlins.

In December 2020, the league announced a rebrand as Kalamazoo Roller Derby in a move to embrace diversity and inclusion.

== WFTDA competition ==
In 2013, Killamazoo qualified for WFTDA Playoffs for the first time, participating at the Division 2 tournament they hosted at Wings Stadium. Killamazoo was the third seed and finished the tournament in third place with a 250-219 victory over NEO Roller Derby (Akron, Ohio). In 2014, KDD again qualified for Division 2 Playoffs, and were the fourth seed at Kitchener-Waterloo, Ontario, and won the third place game 180-162 over Gold Coast Derby Grrls of Fort Lauderdale.

Season	Final ranking	Playoffs	Championship
2011	20 NC	DNQ	DNQ
2012	13 NC	DNQ	DNQ
2013	45 WFTDA	3 D2	DNQ
2014	61 WFTDA	3 D2	DNQ
2015	80 WFTDA	DNQ	DNQ
2016	94 WFTDA	DNQ	DNQ
2017	99 WFTDA	DNQ	DNQ
