= Cape Fear Roller Derby =

Roller derby league in North Carolina, US

- Metro area: Wilmington, NC
- Country: United States
- Founded: 2005
- Teams: All-Stars (A team); Black Harrts (B team)
- Track type: Flat
- Venue: Schwartz Center; Carolina Beach Rec Center
- Affiliations: WFTDA
- Website: https://www.capefearrollerderby.com

Cape Fear Roller Derby (formerly known as Cape Fear Roller Girls) is a women's flat track roller derby league located in Wilmington, North Carolina. Established in 2005, the league features two teams that compete against teams from various other leagues. Cape Fear is also a member of the Women's Flat Track Derby Association (WFTDA)

== History and organization ==
The league was established in November 2005 as the Cape Fear Killers, with assistance from the Carolina Rollergirls. A skater from Cape Fear later founded Mass Attack Roller Derby.

Cape Fear was accepted into the Women's Flat Track Derby Association Apprentice Program in July 2010, and became a full member of the WFTDA in June 2011.

When gameplay resumed in 2023 after the COVID-19 pandemic, the team changed its name to Cape Fear Roller Derby and opened the league up to all genders.

== WFTDA rankings ==
| Season | Final ranking | Playoffs | Championship |
|---|---|---|---|
| 2012 | 22 E | DNQ | DNQ |
| 2013 | 141 WFTDA | DNQ | DNQ |
| 2014 | 119 WFTDA | DNQ | DNQ |
| 2015 | 113 WFTDA | DNQ | DNQ |
| 2016 | 110 WFTDA | DNQ | DNQ |
| 2017 | 107 WFTDA | DNQ | DNQ |

== External Website ==
- Cape Fear Roller Derby
