= Jet City Roller Derby =

Roller derby league

- Metro area: Everett, Washington
- Country: United States
- Founded: 2006
- Teams: Bombers (A team); Aviators; Skyraiders
- Track type: Flat
- Venue: Edmonds Community College
- Affiliations: WFTDA
- Org. type: Non-profit
- Website: www.jetcityrollerderby.com

Jet City Roller Derby (JCRD) is a women's flat track roller derby league based in Everett, Washington. Founded in 2006, Jet City is a member of the Women's Flat Track Derby Association (WFTDA).

== History ==
Jet City was founded as Jet City Rollergirls in July 2006 by four friends, who were inspired after watching the Rat City Rollergirls, who held an exhibition game at the Everett Events Center in March of that year in front of 5000 people. By mid-2007, when they held their first exhibition bout, they already had around 60 skaters. They played their first full season in 2008, and became a full member of the Women's Flat Track Derby Association the following year.

The league initially played in a 900-seat venue at Everett Community College, but moved to its larger 2,000-seat venue in 2011, which they regularly sold out. As of 2017, Jet City hosted games at Shoreline Derby Center in Shoreline and the league consisted of four home teams, as well as an all-star team which competed against teams from other leagues in WFTDA competition.

In January 2018, the league announced it was rebranding as Jet City Roller Derby, and coalescing its home teams into two B teams.

== WFTDA competition ==
Jet City first qualified for WFTDA Playoffs in 2010, as the seventh seed at that year's WFTDA Western Regional Tournament, where they finished in seventh place, capped by a 149–95 victory over Tucson Roller Derby. In 2011, Jet City was the eighth seed at the Western Regional and again played in the seventh place game, this time losing 140–105 to Sacred City Derby Girls to finish in eighth place.

After missing Playoffs in 2012, Jet City returned to the new Division 2 Playoffs in 2013 in Des Moines, Iowa, entering the weekend as the fifth seed. After victories over DC Rollergirls and Fabulous Sin City Rollergirls, Jet City took first place in the tournament with a 208–113 win against Blue Ridge Rollergirls and also qualified for WFTDA Championships for the first time. At Championships, Jet City defeated Santa Cruz Derby Girls 195–194 to claim the first Division 2 title. In 2014, Jet City moved up to Division 1 Playoffs as the eighth seed and finished in ninth, finishing with a 183–133 win over SoCal Derby. Jet City returned to Division 2 in 2015 at Cleveland as the eighth seed and finished in seventh by beating Oklahoma Victory Dolls 179–137. In 2016, a loss to Brandywine eliminated top-seeded Jet City from eligibility for Division 2 Championships, but they secured third place at Wichita with a 132–118 victory over Nashville Rollergirls. Jet City again qualified for the Division 2 Playoffs and Championship in 2017 as the fourth seed in Pittsburgh, and finished the weekend in sixth place.

In 2018, Jet City qualified for the WFTDA North American West Continental Cup held in Omaha, Nebraska as the seventh seed, and after losing their opening game finished in the consolation round.

=== Rankings ===
Season	Final ranking	Playoffs	Championship
2010	7 W	7 W	DNQ
2011	8 W	8 W	DNQ
2012	10 W	DNQ	DNQ
2013	36 WFTDA	1 D2	1 D2
2014	42 WFTDA	9 D1	DNQ
2015	59 WFTDA	7 D2	DNQ
2016	44 WFTDA	3 D2	DNQ
2017	40 WFTDA	N/A	6 D2
2018	62 WFTDA	CR CC NA West	NA

- CR = consolation round

Preceded by New tournament	WFTDA Division 2 Championship winners 2013	Succeeded by Detroit Derby Girls
