= Brandywine Roller Derby =

Roller derby league

- Metro area: Downingtown, PA
- Country: United States
- Founded: December, 2010
- Teams: Belligerents (A team); Brawlers (B team) Brute Squad (C team)
- Track type(s): Flat
- Affiliations: WFTDA
- Org. type: 501(c)(3)
- Website: brandywinerollerderby.com

Brandywine Roller Derby (BRD) is a flat track roller derby league based in Downingtown, Pennsylvania. Founded in 2010, Brandywine is a member of the Women's Flat Track Derby Association (WFTDA).

Brandywine Roller Derby was originally known as the "Brandywine Roller Girls", but changed their name ahead of the 2016 season in order to better represent its members. Home games are played at the 422 SportsPlex in Pottstown, PA, with the largest games attracting up to 500 spectators at a time.

== WFTDA history ==
Brandywine was accepted as an apprentice member of the WFTDA in October 2012, and became a full member of the WFTDA in June 2013. Represented by their charter team the Belligerents, Brandywine qualified for the International WFTDA Division 2 Playoffs for the first time in 2014, and returned in 2015 and 2016. At the 2016 Playoff in Wichita, 4th-seed Brandywine took first place against the Blue Ridge Rollergirls 146-123, thus qualifying for the 2016 International Division 2 WFTDA Championships for the first time in their history. At the Championships in Portland, Oregon, Brandywine came in second place, losing the final 257-188 to Blue Ridge, their opponent from the Wichita tournament.

=== Rankings ===
| Season | Final ranking | Playoffs | Championship |
|---|---|---|---|
| 2013 | 52 WFTDA | DNQ | DNQ |
| 2014 | 74 WFTDA | 8 D2 | DNQ |
| 2015 | 54 WFTDA | 6 D2 | DNQ |
| 2016 | 45 WFTDA | 1 D2 | 2 D2 |
| 2017 | 76 WFTDA | DNQ | DNQ |
| 2018 | 79 WFTDA | DNQ | DNQ |
