= Treasure Valley Rollergirls =

Flat track roller derby league in Idaho, USA

- Metro area: Boise, ID
- Country: United States
- Founded: 2006
- Teams: All Stars (A team); Boise River Rollers (B team)
- Track type: Flat
- Venue: CenturyLink Arena Boise
- Affiliations: WFTDA
- Website: www.tvrderby.com

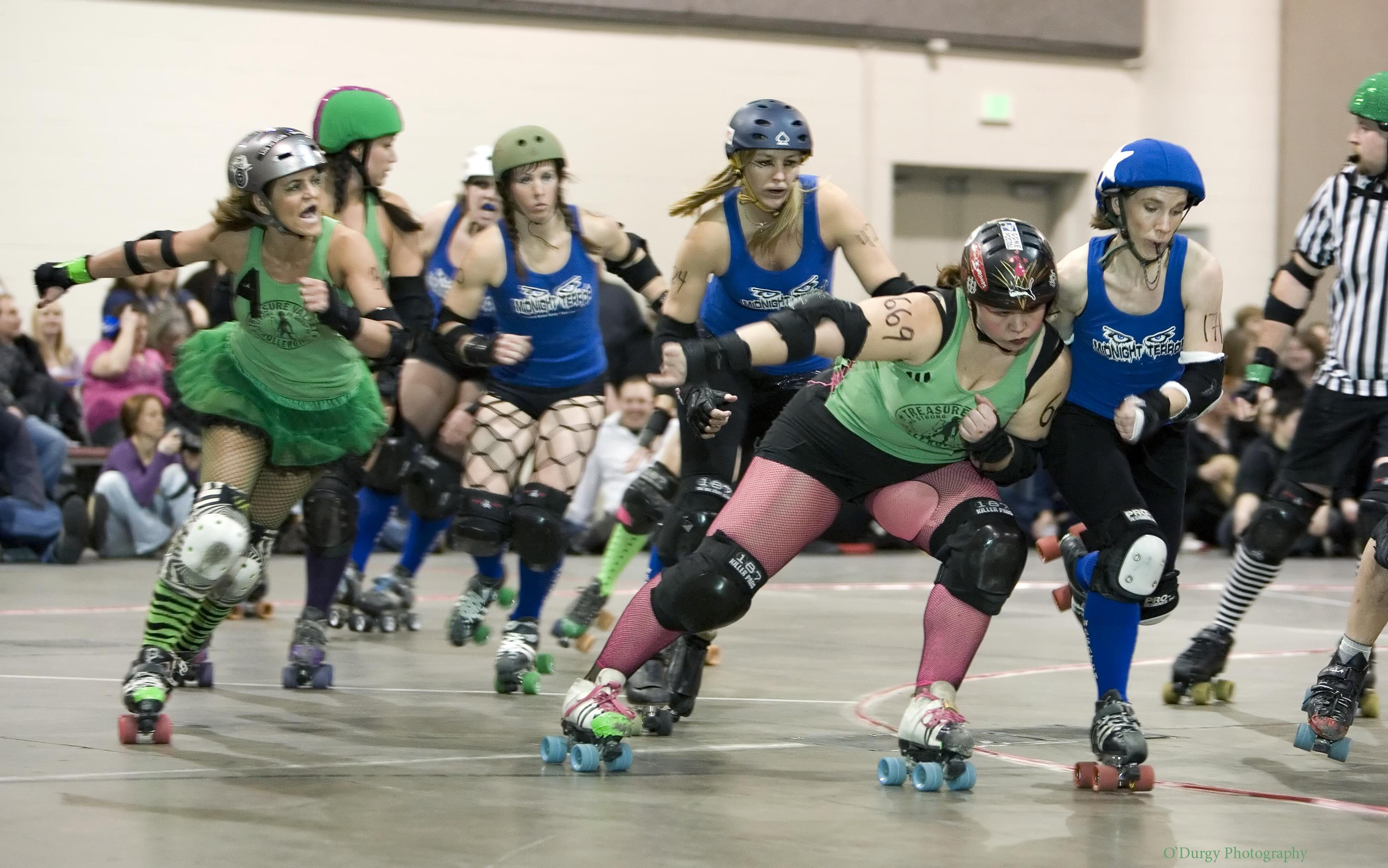
TVR (in their original livery) vs. Utah's Wasatch Midnight Terror in 2010

The Treasure Valley Rollergirls (TVR) is a women's flat track roller derby league based in Boise, Idaho. Founded in 2006, Treasure Valley is a member of the Women's Flat Track Derby Association (WFTDA). They are currently ranked at 29th place in the league.

== History and organization ==
Treasure Valley was formed in February 2006, shortly after the television series Rollergirls began airing, and played its first season the following year. In January 2008, it faced the top teams in the Northwest in a tournament hosted by the Rat City Rollergirls. Around this point, it had four teams: the B-Town Battalion, Cell Block B, the Devil's Darlings and the Derailers, but these were subsequently disbanded shortly after the omnibus league moved from its grass roots beginnings at Expo Idaho in Garden City to Century Link Arena in downtown Boise.

The league was accepted into the WFTDA Apprentice Program in April 2010, and became a full member of the WFTDA in September 2011. Treasure Valley began hosting a tournament in its own right, the annual SpudTown Knockdown, an international annual two-day double bracket elimination tournament (typically held at what is now Idaho Central Arena in downtown Boise over the Labor Day weekend). Characterized as "the Best of the Rest of the West," as it took place prior to the WFTDA's annual Playoff tournaments, the fourth annual SpudTown Knockdown, in a return to the TVR's roots, was held at Expo Idaho on July 20–21, 2013.

== WFTDA competition ==
Treasure Valley has competed at WFTDA Division 2 Playoffs numerous times, most recently at the Division 2 Playoffs and Championship in 2017 as the #13 seed in Pittsburgh, where they lost both their games to finish out of the medals.

=== Post pandemic ===
WFTDA moved back to regional ranking. Treasure Valley Roller Derby held its first post-pandemic event June 25, 2022, a round-robin tournament named 'Bout Time. Skaters from Wasatch Roller Derby and Jackson Hole Juggernauts came to Eagle Idaho to play at the Eagle Ada sports complex.

Treasure Valley Roller Derby also traveled in 2022 to Carson City Nevada and competed in the Battle for the Silver Skate. Treasure Valley Roller Derby played 3 games and won each, taking home the trophy for the tournament.

In 2023, Treasure Valley Roller Derby gained enough skaters to revive the B team, Boise River Rollers. The league held 5 doubleheader game nights at Idaho Central Arena in Downtown Boise. The All-Stars went undefeated over their home summer season. The All-Stars then traveled to Reno, Nevada in October of 2023 to Sierra Regional Roller Derby's Tournament, Deep Blue. The All-Stars played 2 WFTDA Sanctioned games there and won both against Monterey Bay Roller Derby and High Altitude Roller Derby. The All-Stars improved their ranking from the beginning of 2023 at 54, in WFTDA North American West Region, to 19.

=== Rankings ===
Season	Final ranking	Playoffs	Championship
2012	21 W	DNQ	DNQ
2013	43 WFTDA	3 D2	DNQ
2014	69 WFTDA	5 D2	DNQ
2015	58 WFTDA	10 D2	DNQ
2016	62 WFTDA	DNQ	DNQ
2017	62 WFTDA	N/A	CR D2

- CR = consolation round
