= Bear City Roller Derby =

Roller derby league

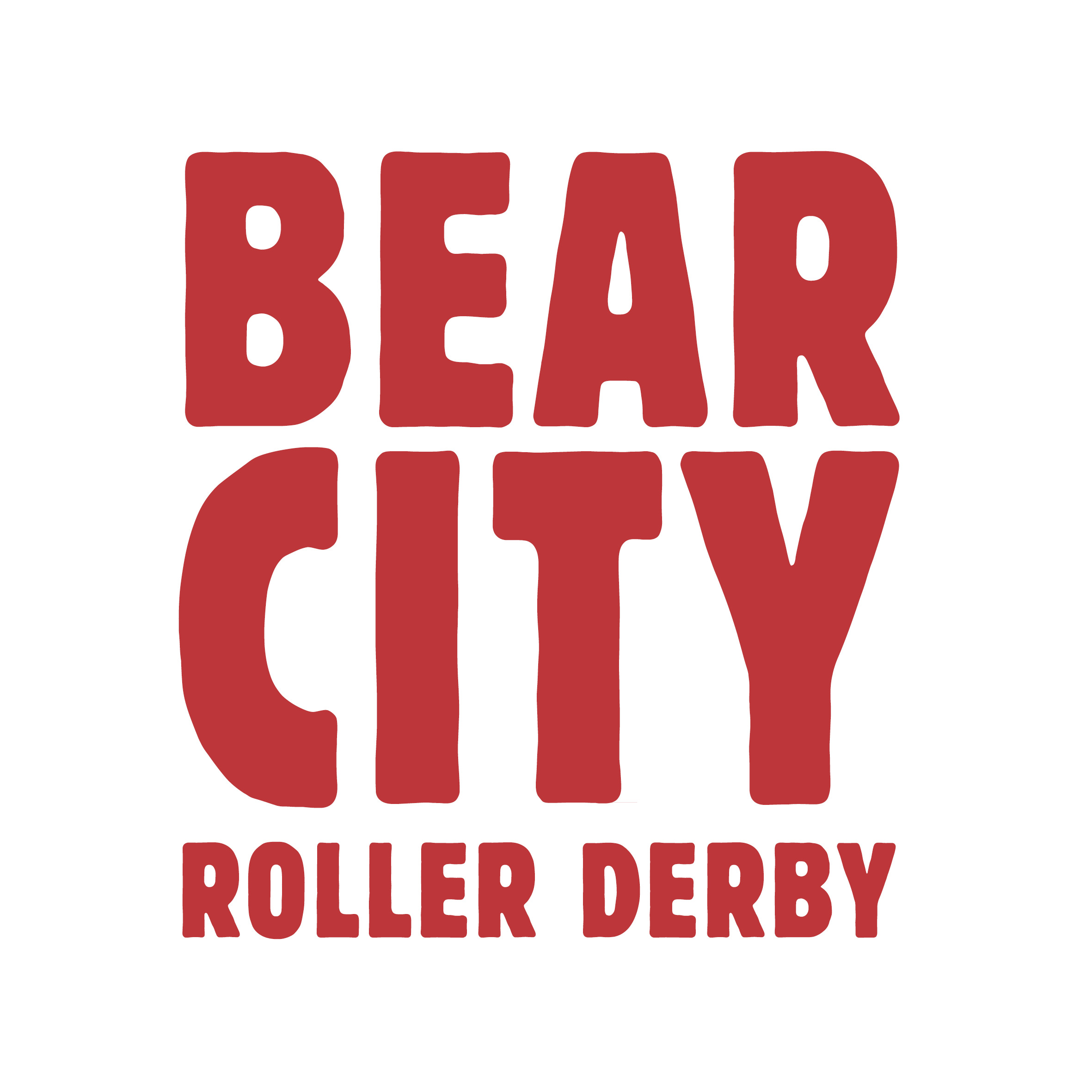
- Metro area: Berlin
- Country: Germany
- Founded: 2008
- Teams: Wallstars (A team); Wallbreakers (B team); Breaking Bears (C team)
- Track type: Flat
- Affiliations: WFTDA
- Website: Official website

Bear City Roller Derby (BCRD) is a flat track roller derby league based in Berlin. Founded in 2008, the league is a member of the Women's Flat Track Derby Association (WFTDA).

== History ==
The league was founded as the Berlin Bombshells. It was the second roller derby league in Germany, and was assisted in its early development by the first league, the Stuttgart Valley Rollergirlz. In its early days, it was forced out of its practice hall by Berlin's sports department; the team took legal action to regain access to public space. The league gained visibility when skater Diane Rott transferred from the B.ay A.rea D.erby Girls.

Original Berlin Bombshells logo

It competed in the first roller derby bout between two German leagues, against the Stuttgart Valley Rollergirlz in 2009. The same year, it participated in "Roll Britannia", the first roller derby tournament in Europe, and in December hosted the first European Roller Derby Organisational Conference (EROC).

Bear City hosted the first German Roller Derby Championship in December 2010, losing 124–128 to Stuttgart in the final.

In July 2016, the league announced it had officially changed its name to Bear City Roller Derby.

== WFTDA competition ==
Secondary Bear City logo

In October 2010, the league was accepted as an apprentice member of the WFTDA. By May 2011, it had more than 60 skaters.

In March 2012, Bear City Roller Derby became the WFTDA’s first full member league in continental Europe.

The league has since competed in multiple Division 2 Playoffs and Championships, with its 2014 appearance marking the first time a continental European team competed at a WFTDA Championship event.

=== Rankings ===
Season	Final ranking	Playoffs	Championship
2012	23 E	DNQ	DNQ
2013	132 WFTDA	DNQ	DNQ
2014	52 WFTDA	2 D2	3 D2
2015	45 WFTDA	6 D2	DNQ
2016	50 WFTDA	5 D2	DNQ
2017	50 WFTDA	N/A	10 D2
2018	31 WFTDA	CR	DNQ
2019	25 WFTDA	CR	DNQ
2023	13 Europe	NPS	NPS
2024	14 Europe	DNQ	DNQ

- CR = consolation round
- NPS = no postseason
- no final WFTDA rankings 2020-2022 due to COVID-19 pandemic
