= Junior Roller Derby Association =

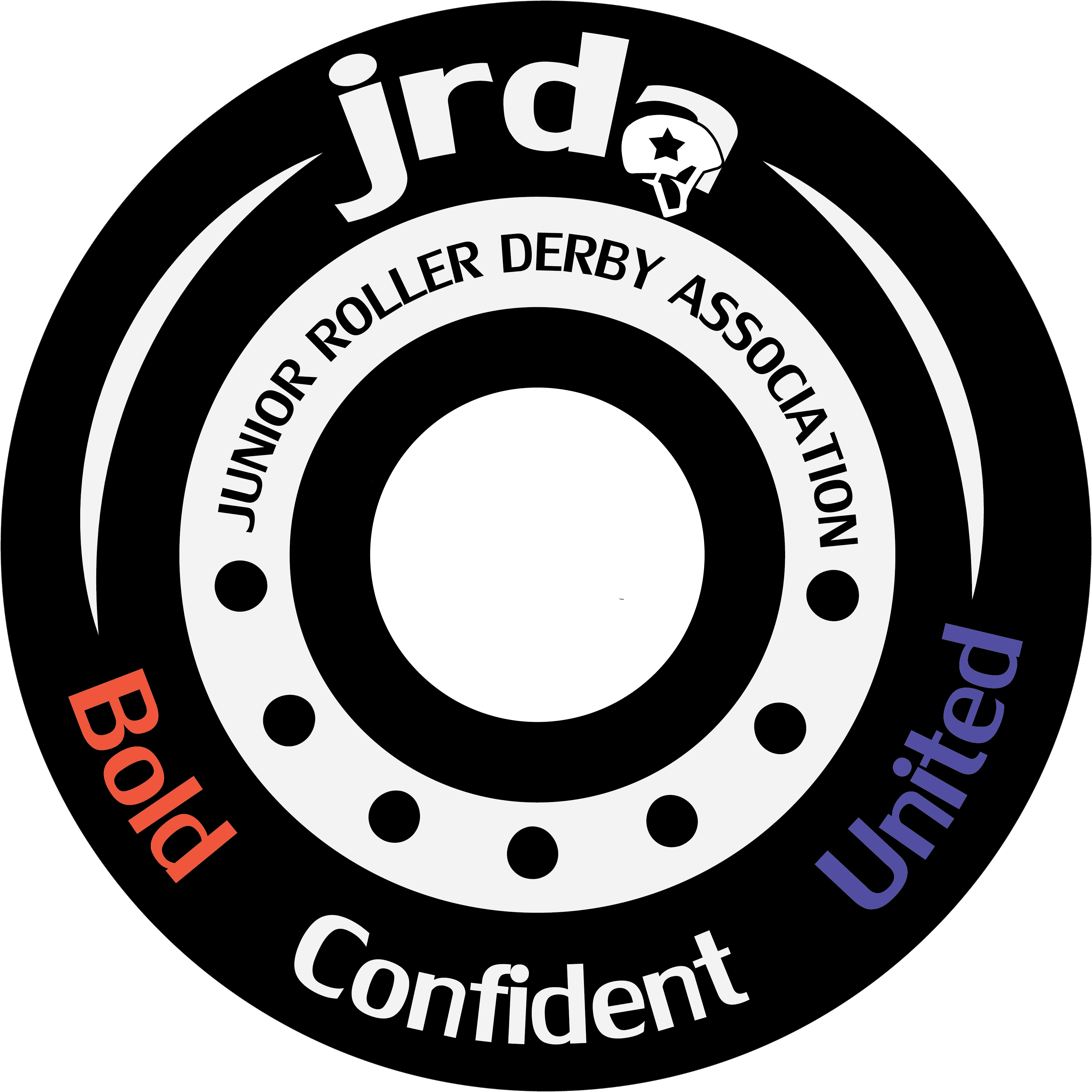
- JRDA logo
- Sport: Roller Derby
- Founded: 2006
- Countries: Australia; Argentina; Belgium; Canada; Chile; Finland; France; Germany; Ireland; Japan; Mexico; Netherlands; New Zealand; United Kingdom; United States
- Website: http://www.juniorrollerderby.org/home

The Junior Roller Derby Association is the governing body of youth roller derby, modified for children and adolescents up to 18 years of age. The sport is played in both modified-contact, known as "positional blocking," and full-contact approaches, to facilitate safety across multiple age and skill groups.

== Growth of the Sport ==
The origins of junior roller derby are in contention, with multiple leagues claiming they were founded earliest. The Seattle Derby Brats and the Tucson Derby Brats, the first two junior roller derby leagues to present teams for inter-league play, are the two oldest leagues in existence. The Tucson Derby Brats were established in Tucson, Arizona by three young fans of the Tucson Roller Derby adult league: Tristan Hasman, Arlee Garcia-Thwing and Zoe Catalanotte Reeves. The team began practicing in 2005 and held their first official, full-length bout on October 20th, 2006. The Seattle Derby Brats were founded by Krista Lafontaine Williams, a member of Rat City Roller Derby, in Seattle, Washington.

At the 2007 Women's Flat Track Derby Association Texas Shootout Nationals Tournament in Austin, Texas, the two existing junior leagues, the Tucson Derby Brats and the Seattle Derby Brats, held a demonstration bout between rounds in the tournament. Following this national exposure, leagues began forming in other towns across the United States. In order to support the growth of new leagues and standardize rule sets, the Junior Roller Derby Association (JRDA) was formed in 2009 and incorporated in March, 2010 in Austin.

In February 2010, there were over 40 junior roller derby programs across four countries at various stages in development. In 2013 junior roller derby grew its international presence including 38 international leagues located in Canada, Belgium, Japan and Australia. Inter-league competition of all junior leagues worldwide is maintained by the Junior Roller Derby Association (JRDA).

Teen Vogue noted a trend of Junior Roller Derby players sticking with their extracurricular sport and aging up into the adult leagues.

== History ==
On October 1, 2009, the Junior Roller Derby Association (JRDA) was formally established. Continuing to grow and thrive, JRDA implemented a formal membership program providing junior leagues with resources such as:

- new league start-up and expansion for existing leagues
- creating modification to the current flat track derby rules that allowed for participation at all skill levels
- creating a training program for advancing skater skills
- partnering with roller derby organizations to provide insurance
- plan skater development
- match skaters for safe and fair inter-league play

In the last three months of 2009 the board of directors with assistance from dedicated committee volunteers drafted policies and mission statements needed to begin local grassroots junior roller derby programs.

In 2010 the JRDA began the process of incorporating in Austin, Texas as a 501(c)3 non-profit corporation for promoting the advancement of national and international amateur athletics through roller derby.

The mission of JRDA is to nurture bold self-confidence in youth by developing teamwork and athletic ability while treasuring individuality within a culture of integration, encouragement, and service to others. JRDA partners with competitive & recreational junior leagues, communities & schools, mentors & families; to empower youth through the international sport of roller derby.

The JRDA uses The Rules of Flat Track Roller Derby as per the Women's Flat Track Derby Association with addenda.

== Junior Roller Derby championships ==
In 2014, the JRDA hosted the first junior roller derby championships in Daytona Beach, Florida. 17 National JRDA Member Leagues participated in a 2-day Tournament played on 4 tracks.

With the implementation of the JRDA Games Dept., and newly formed Games Sanctioning policy, Team Divisions, and Team Rankings System at the end of 2014, the JRDA highlighted the top teams in the world with an invitation to participate in the 2015 JRDA Championships, held in Kent, Washington. The top teams from each Division played at the highest level of Junior Derby over 3 days on 2 tracks.

Year	Host	Female Division			Open Division		
Year	Host	1st place	Result	2nd place	1st place	Result	2nd place
2015	(Washington (state)) Kent, Washington	Seattle Derby Brats-Galaxy Girls	189 - 168	I-5 Rollergirls	California Mayhem	231 - 160	The Attack Pack
2016	Lincoln, Nebraska	Seattle Derby Brats	291-98	Angel City	Des Moines	214-189	Mob City Misfits
2017	Loveland, Colorado	Seattle Derby Brats	210-142	Santa Cruz Derby Groms	Diamond City Minors	218-157	FoCo Spartans
2018	Philadelphia, Pennsylvania	Santa Cruz Derby Groms	177-154	Seattle Derby Brats	Diamond City Minors	230-188	Des Moines
2019	Loveland, Colorado	Los Anarchists	150-123	Santa Cruz Derby Groms	Diamond City Minors	206-73	Philly Roller Derby Juniors
2020 - cancelled	Kalamazoo, Michigan						
2022	Phoenix, Arizona	Rose City Rollers Juniors	140-136	Santa Cruz Derby Groms	Philly Roller Derby Juniors	199-90	Cherry City Cherry Blossoms
2023	Rockville, Maryland	Santa Cruz Derby Groms	121-100	Rose City Rollers Juniors	Philly Roller Derby Juniors	335-237	Spokane Roller Derby
2024	Chicago, Illinois	Santa Cruz Derby Groms	158-99	Rose City Rollers Juniors	Philly Roller Derby Juniors	248-245	FoCo Junior Roller Derby
2025	Loveland, Colorado	Santa Cruz Derby Groms	124-57	Rose City Rollers Juniors	Philly Roller Derby Juniors	251-249	FoCo Junior Roller Derby

== Junior Roller Derby World Cup ==
Year	Host	Finals			3rd place playoff		
Year	Host	Champion	Result	Runner-up	3rd	Result	4th
2015	(United States) Kent, Washington	(United States) USA West	194 - 139	(United States) USA East	Canada	258 - 114	Australia
2018	(United States) Philadelphia, Pennsylvania	(United States) USA West	218 - 169	(United States) USA East	Canada	319 - 87	Australia
2021 - cancelled	(Canada) Regina, Saskatchewan						
2023	Valence, France	(United States) USA	277 - 150	France	Australia	342 - 194	Canada
2025	Brisbane, Australia	(United States) USA	429 - 211	France	(United Kingdom) GB	267 - 208	Australia

=== 2015 ===
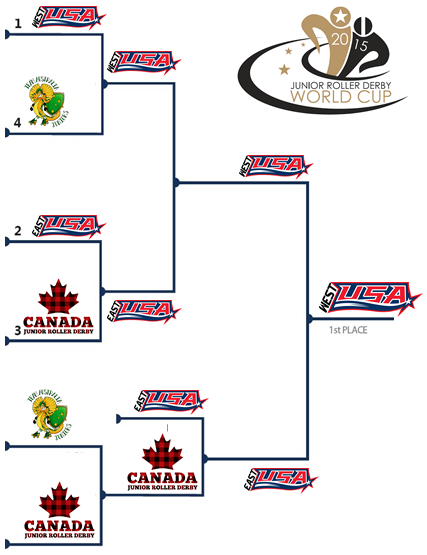
JRDA 2015 World Cup Bracket

July 2015 the JRDA hosted the inaugural Junior Roller Derby World Cup held in Kent, Washington.

Although a number of nations were expected to participate, only 3 countries attended, with the USA providing two teams, one representing USA West and the other USA East. The two other nations were Canada and Australia.

The first day of competition saw each team play each other to determine seeding for the following days competition bracket. The final was won by USA West defeating USA East. Canada took third place over Australia.

=== 2018 ===
The 2018 edition of the Junior Roller Derby World Cup was held in Philadelphia, Pennsylvania in July 2018. The participating nations again were Australia, Canada and the United States split into East and West teams whilst Team Great Britain Junior Roller Derby and a Europe representative team were involved for the first time.

=== 2021 ===
The 2021 Junior World Cup host city was announced as the Canadian city of Regina, Saskatchewan. however this was cancelled due to the COVID-19 pandemic.

=== 2023 ===
The 2023 Junior World Cup was hosted in the French city of Valence, Drôme.

=== 2025 ===
The 2025 Junior World Cup was hosted in Brisbane from July 26 to 28, 2025. The participating teams in the Open Division were USA, Canada, United Kingdom, France, Belgium, and Australia. The Female Division participants were USA, Mexico, Denmark, Sweden, Australia, and New Zealand. USA took home both divisions' gold medals.

=== 2027 ===
The 2027 Junior World Cup will be hosted at the Braehead Arena near Glasgow in Scotland from July 22 to 25, 2027.

== JRDA and the AAU Junior Olympics ==
In February 2015 the JRDA made history when they announced their partnership with the Amateur Athletic Union (AAU) to bring Junior Roller Derby to one of the largest world stages by taking Junior Derby to the Olympics.

The JRDA was quoted in saying, "The Junior Roller Derby Association (JRDA) and the Amateur Athletic Union (AAU) are proud to present a unique competition opportunity for junior roller derby athletes in a co-ed event hosted in Lincoln, Nebraska July, 2016."

They then went on to add, "In this collaboration with USARS to bring Jr Derby into the AAU Junior Olympics, the JRDA is taking a big step forward in the development of the sport." This will be the first Roller Derby games that will be played and recognized by an Olympic committee.
