= Dead End Derby =

Roller derby league

- Metro area: Christchurch
- Country: New Zealand
- Founded: 2007
- Teams: Death Stars (A team); Living Dead Rollers (B team) Rolling Dead (Juniors Team)
- Track type: Flat
- Venue: Cowles Stadium
- Affiliations: Women's Flat Track Derby Association
- Org. type: Non-profit
- Website: deadendderby.org

Dead End Derby (DED) is an all-inclusive flat track roller derby league based in Christchurch, New Zealand.

The league currently consists of two teams, the "Death Stars" A team and "Living Dead Rollers" B team that was formed in 2012 as well as two officials crews consisting of referees and non-skating officials.

Dead End Derby has Adult & Junior "Learn to Skate" programs as well as "Derby 101: Learn To Roller Derby" programs for recruits.

Dead End Derby is a member of the Women's Flat Track Derby Association (WFTDA).

In 2024, Dead End Derby unanimously voted to become all-inclusive, meaning all genders are accepted into the league.

== History ==
The league was founded in November 2007 by Cherry Blunt and her sister Crass, along with MissChevusMynx, Mystique, Bitch n Famous, Stevie Nails, Blood Angel and Ur shadow.

The league played its first bout in September 2009, splitting the league into two demonstration teams "Hellbound Harlots" and "School Assassination Squad". The game brought in the country's largest roller derby crowd to that date of around 2000 people.

From 2010 to 2012 the league held an internal competition between three intraleague teams, the Filthy Habits, Cellblock Brawlers and Carnage Academy, for the Tequila Mockingbird Cup. Carnage Academy were undefeated. From 2013 the intraleague competition was abandoned in favor of themed demonstration bouts.

In 2012, Dead End Derby put on a major bootcamp for fifty skaters, coached by Bonnie D.Stroir, a coach of Team USA.

Dead End was accepted into the Women's Flat Track Derby Association (WFTDA) Apprentice Program in July 2016, and became a full WFTDA member in July 2017.

== Interleague competition ==
The league hosted its first interleague game in 2011, which was also New Zealand's first inter-island bout, against Richter City Roller Derby from Wellington.

In 2012 Dead End's All Stars entered New Zealand's first national roller derby tournament, "Derby Royale" in Palmerston North, hosted by Swamp City Roller Rats. The team emerged with a 2-win, 2-loss record, defeating Mount Militia Derby Crew and River City Rollers before being beaten by Hellmilton Roller Ghouls and hosts and finalists Swamp City.

At the second Derby Royale tournament the following year, they achieved a 4-win, 2-loss record, losing only to eventual champions Pirate City Rollers and finalists Auckland Roller Derby League.

There was no national tournament or structured ranking system in place in New Zealand for 2014. In 2015 the All Stars were ranked #3 on Geex Quad's New Zealand roller derby strength rankings table. In 2016 they were losing finalists in the New Zealand Roller Derby Top 10 Champs competition and finished the year ranked #4 on the rankings table.

The Living Dead Rollers had an undefeated 2016 season, placing first in the Mainland Mayhem: South Island Division 2 Tournament.

Domestic Interleague Competition Results
Year	All Stars				Living Dead			
Year	P	W	L	Notes	P	W	L	Notes
2011	2	0	2	First NZ inter-island bout	-	-	-	
2012	10	6	4	Derby Royale 2w:2l	2	1	1	
2013	11	6	5	Derby Royale 4w:2l	4	4	0	Undefeated
2014	6	5	1	Undefeated at home	4	3	1	Undefeated at home
2015	3	2	1	Undefeated at home, ranked 3rd	3	2	1	Undefeated at home, ranked 10th
2016	6	4	2	Champs runners up, ranked 4th	6	6	0	Undefeated, ranked 12th

== International Competition ==
Four skaters from the league were selected to play for Roller Derby Team New Zealand in the 2011 Roller Derby World Cup. Hurricane Hori, MissChevusMynx, Black Panther and Evil K Knevil. The 2011 national team captain, Hurricane Hori, was a former Dead End Derby skater. The New Zealand team placed eighth out of 13 teams.

In 2015, Evil was again rostered to represent New Zealand at the Roller Derby World Cup. New Zealand were placed sixth.

Also in 2015, the Dead End Derby All Stars played their first international bouts, at the Royale Rumble tournament in Australia, losing both games.

In 2016 they returned to the same tournament, returning with a 2-win, 1-loss record.

2017 was Dead End's best season record to date with 4 wins and 0 losses.

In 2019, Dead End played a season of 3 wins and 2 losses.

== WFTDA rankings ==
Season	Final ranking	Playoffs	Championship
2017	131 WFTDA	DNQ	DNQ
2018	NR WFTDA	DNQ	DNQ
2019	115 WFTDA	DNQ	DNQ

- NR = no end-of-year ranking assigned
- no WFTDA rankings 2020-2022 due to COVID-19 pandemic
