= Chacabuco (disambiguation) =

The Battle of Chacabuco was a decisive victory fought by Chilean and Argentine forces against the Spanish forces in Chile during the Chilean War of Independence in 1817. The name Chacabuco may also refer to:

== Chile ==
- Chacabuco Valley, the origin of the name
- Chacabuco Cuesta, a Mountain pass through the Chilean Coast Range (Cordillera de la Costa)
- Chacabuco, an abandoned nitrate or "saltpeter" town in the Atacama Desert of northern Chile
- Chacabuco Province, a Province in central Chile
- Puerto Chacabuco, a town in Chile
- Chacabuco River, a river in Chile
- Chilean ship Chacabuco, a number of warships of Chile

== Argentina ==
- Chacabuco, Buenos Aires, a city in Buenos Aires Province, Argentina
- Chacabuco Partido, a political division in Buenos Aires Province, Argentina
- Chacabuco Department, San Luis, a political division in San Luis Province, Argentina
- Chacabuco Department, Chaco, a political division in Chaco Province, Argentina
- Parque Chacabuco, a neighborhood in the city of Buenos Aires, Argentina
- Chacabuco Park, a city park in Buenos Aires, Argentina
