= Richter City Roller Derby =

Roller derby league

- Metro area: Wellington
- Country: New Zealand
- Founded: 2007
- Teams: All Stars (A team); Convicts (B team)
- Track type: Flat
- Venue: TSB Bank Arena
- Affiliations: WFTDA
- Website: www.richtercity.co.nz

Richter City Roller Derby is a women's flat track roller derby league based in Wellington, New Zealand. Founded in 2007, the league currently consists of three intraleague teams, and two interleague teams. The league's colours are orange and purple. Richter City is a member of the Women's Flat Track Derby Association (WFTDA).

== History ==
Richter City gained early publicity by performing demonstrations at the 2008 Dance Your Socks Off! Festival. Their first bout in March 2009 sold out the basketball hall used as the venue.

In late 2009, the league held its first season of intraleague competition, which saw crowds averaging 950 people. In mid-season the league moved its bouts to TSB Bank Arena as spectator crowds were exceeding the capacity of the previous venue, a basketball hall.

In 2011 the league won the Air New Zealand Personality of the Year Award at the Wellington Sports Awards, beating Lower Hutt boxing identity Billy Graham, All Black Piri Weepu, and veteran sports broadcaster Keith Quinn in the popular vote.

In July 2012, Richter City was accepted as a member of the Women's Flat Track Derby Association Apprentice Programme, and became a full WFTDA member in December 2013.

== Intraleague competition ==
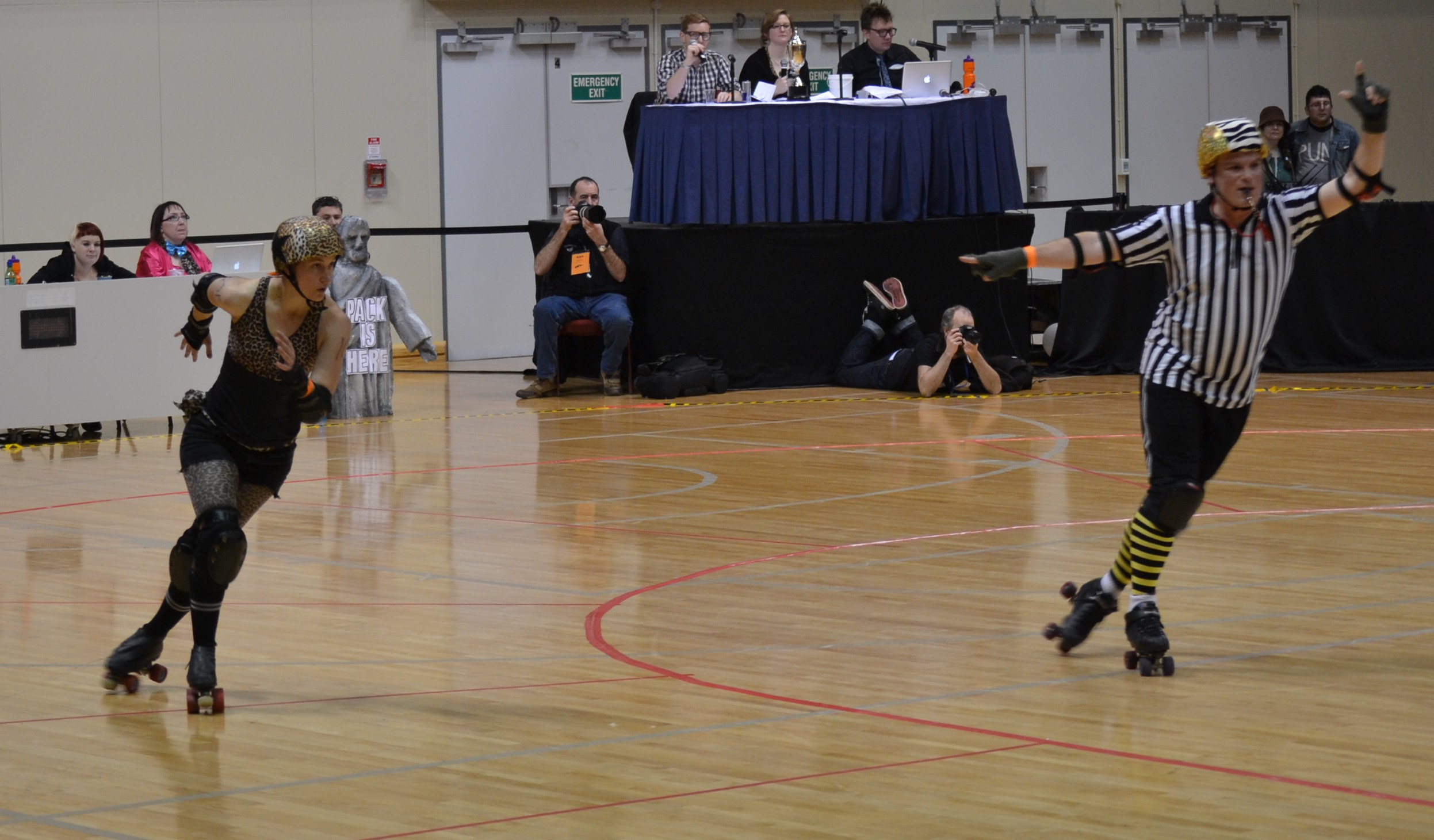
Roller Derby Team New Zealand member Tuff Bikkies (Meryn McAulay), jamming for Smash Malice in the 2011 Richter City intraleague final.

In 2009 and 2010 two teams contested the intraleague competition; Brutal Pageant (pink & red/beauty pageant theme) and Smash Malice (leopard print/trailer trash theme). By mid-2010, a bout attracted a crowd of more than 3,500 people.

In 2011 the intraleague competition was expanded to include a third team; Comic Slams (blue & silver/super hero and Comic Sans font theme). Comic Slams made the season final, but were beaten by Smash Malice in the title bout.

Richter City's current intraleague teams are beer-themed in honour of Garage Project. Garage Project has sponsored Richter City for over a decade and Richter City wanted to honour their support by theming the 2025 home teams after the local brew company. Home Brew 2025 will showcase the Stone Cold Classics and the Craft Heads battling for the victory.

== Domestic interleague competition ==
Richter City has two interleague teams. The A Team are called the All-Stars and the B team are known as the Convicts.

In late 2009, Richter City hosted New Zealand's first intercity bout against Pirate City Rollers' All Scars, losing 88–174 in front of a crowd of 1,200 people. In December 2010, the All Stars faced the All Scars again, this time in Auckland, with the Pirate City team victorious again.

=== All-Stars ===
Date	Event Nickname	Venue	Opposition League	Opposition Team	Result
20 August 2011	Capital Punishment	YMCA, Auckland City	Pirate City Rollers, Auckland	All Scars	Loss
15 October 2011	N/A	Kensington Stadium, Whangārei	Northland Nightmares, Whangārei	Hell's Wives	Win
12 November 2011	N/A	Pioneer Stadium, Christchurch	Dead End Derby, Christchurch	All Stars	Win 156-67
3 December 2011	The Fright Before Christmas	TSB Bank Arena, Wellington	Dead End Derby, Christchurch	All Stars	Win

=== Convicts ===
Date	Event Nickname	Venue	Opposition League	Opposition Team	Result
3 September 2011	Grazed Anatomy	Arena 3, Palmerston North	Taranaki Roller Corp, New Plymouth	Rumble Bees	Loss
3 September 2011	Grazed Anatomy	Arena 3, Palmerston North	Swamp City Roller Rats, Palmerston North	Swamp Rats	Loss
3 December 2011	The Fright Before Christmas	TSB Bank Arena, Wellington	Hellmilton Roller Ghouls, Hamilton	Raggedy Angst	Win

== International Competition ==
In June 2010, several Richter City skaters attended the Great Southern Slam, the Asia-Pacific region's first roller derby tournament, skating as guests of Western Australia Roller Derby. Richter City itself did not compete.

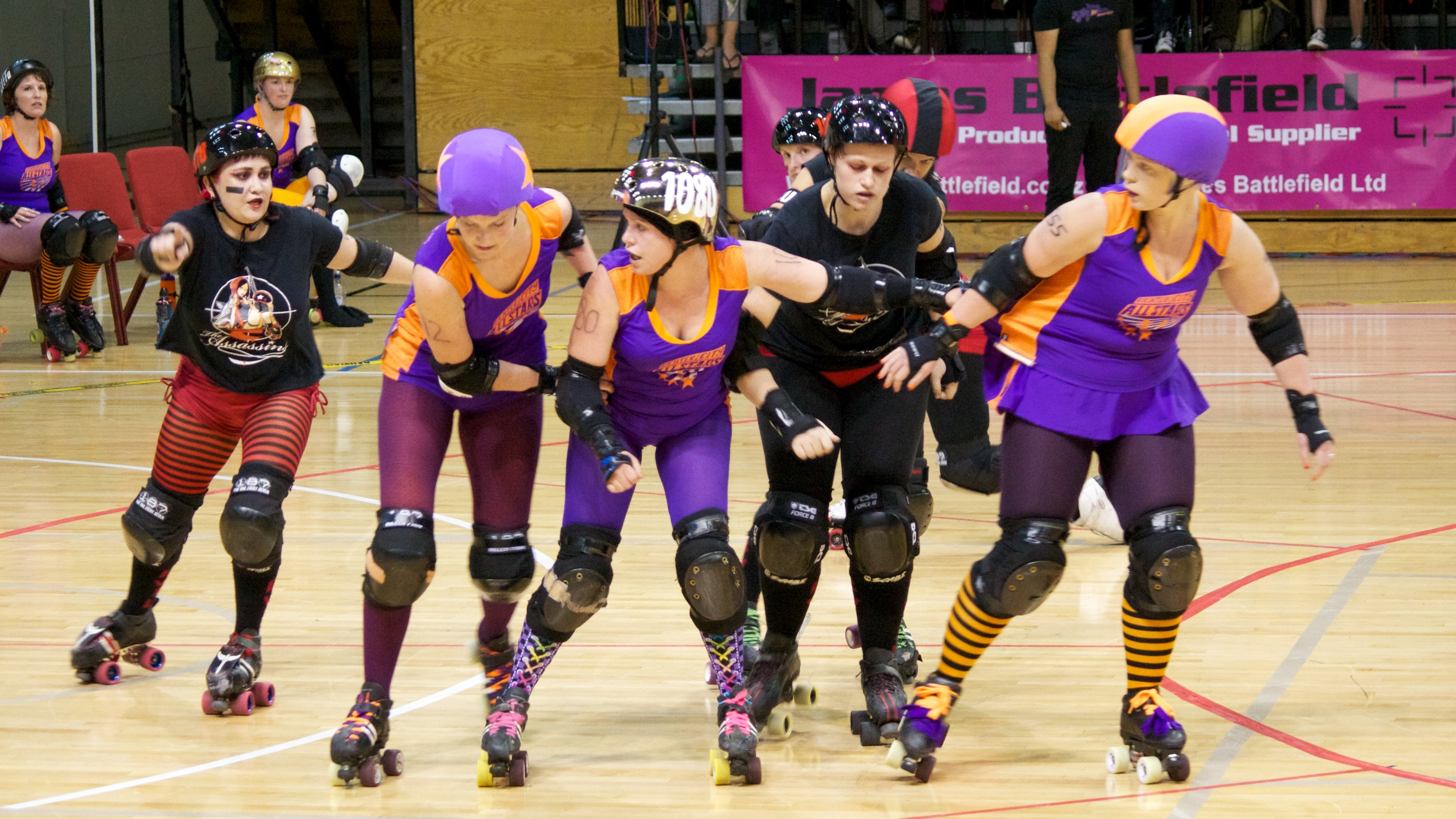
Richter City (in purple) take on the Sydney Roller Derby League in March 2011

In March 2011, Richter City hosted New Zealand's first international roller derby bout, pitting the All Stars against the Sydney Roller Derby League's Assassins. The All Stars lost the bout 164–128. In November, the Richter City All-Stars traveled to Sydney for the away leg of their home-and-away tie against the Sydney Assassins. Again, the Assassins proved too strong and Richter City took a second loss.

In October 2011, Richter City skater Merryn "Tuff Bikkies" McAulay and former Richter City skater Michelle "Perky Nah Nah" Jackson were selected to play for Team New Zealand at the inaugural Roller Derby World Cup, played in Toronto in December 2011. Team New Zealand placed 8th out of 13 teams.

=== WFTDA rankings ===
Season	Final ranking	Playoffs	Championship
2015	157 WFTDA	DNQ	DNQ
2016	168 WFTDA	DNQ	DNQ
2017	180 WFTDA	DNQ	DNQ
2018	249 WFTDA	DNQ	DNQ
2019	130 WFTDA	DNQ	DNQ
2023	9 Oceania	DNQ	DNQ
2024	11 Oceania	DNQ	DNQ
