= Bonnie Thunders =

American roller derby skater

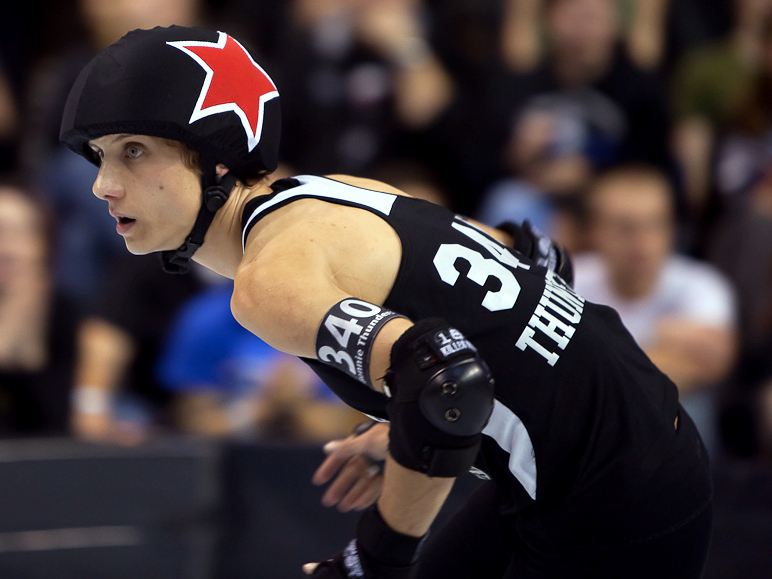
- Thunders with Gotham Roller Derby in 2011

Personal information
- Nickname: Bonnie Thunders
- Nationality: American
- Born: Nicole Williams; 1983 (age 42–43) Youngstown, OH

Sport
- Country: United States
- Sport: Roller derby
- Club: WFTDA; Gotham Girls Roller Derby (2006-16); Rose City Rollers (2017-present)
- Team: GGRD All Stars (2006-16); Wheels of Justice (2017-present)

Achievements and titles
- World finals: World Cup winner: 2011, 2014, 2018, 2025
- Regional finals: WFTDA East Region Playoffs winner: 2007, 2008, 2010, 2011, 2012; WFTDA Division 1 Playoffs winner: 2013, 2014, 2015, 2016, 2017
- National finals: WFTDA Championships winner 2008, 2011, 2012, 2013, 2014, 2018, 2019, 2024

Nicole Williams (born 1983), known as Bonnie Thunders, is a roller derby skater. Widely considered to be the greatest player of modern roller derby, Bonnie Thunders has been referred to by multiple writers as "the LeBron James of roller derby".

== Early life ==
Williams grew up in Rome, New York, where she was a four-year varsity soccer player at Rome Free Academy, before studying conservation biology with the State University of New York College of Environmental Science and Forestry, linked to Syracuse University. She was a leading member of the college's synchronized skating squad, the Syracuse Orange Experience, and also spent time playing soccer competitively.

== Roller derby ==
After moving to New York City, Williams found roller derby and traded in her ice skates for roller skates. In 2006, Williams successfully tried out for the Gotham Girls Roller Derby, and was placed on their Bronx Gridlock team. Taking the name "Bonnie Thunders", in her first season, she was named the league's Rookie of the Year. She soon became part of Gotham's travel team (All Stars), and skated for them when they won the 2008 WFTDA Championships, at which she won the Most Valuable Player award. Although she worked for several years at a conservation charity, in 2010 she opened Five Stride Skate Shop, a roller skate shop in Brooklyn, NY.

By 2009, Bonnie Thunders was the captain of the Gotham Girls All Stars, and was also a member of the Women's Flat Track Derby Association's Tournaments Committee. She currently holds the position of WFTDA Competition Manager. In 2012, Bonnie elected to retire from the Bronx Gridlock team in order to focus on playing with the All Stars.

Thunders won Gotham's Best Jammer award jointly in 2007 and in her own right in 2008, 2009, 2010, 2011, 2012, and 2013. She also won the Derby News Network readers' Most Valuable Jammer award in 2010 and again in 2011. She is double jointed, which she believes helps her maneuver while jamming.

At the end of 2016, Thunders moved to Portland, Oregon, and in January 2017 it was announced that she was officially joining the Rose City Rollers all-star team, the Wheels of Justice.

== International play ==
Bonnie Thunders has represented the United States in international play, having been selected for the Team USA roster for the Roller Derby World Cup in 2011, 2014 and 2018.

== Awards ==
- Gotham Girls Rookie of the Year 2007
- Gotham Girls Best Jammer 2008, 2009, 2010, 2011, 2012, 2013
- Bronx Gridlock MVP 2008, 2010
- Gotham Girls All Stars MVP 2009, 2010, 2011, 2012, 2013
- Gotham Girls League MVP 2010, 2011, 2012, 2013
- WFTDA East Region Playoff MVP 2008
- WFTDA Championships MVP 2008
- WFTDA Division 1 Playoff (Asheville) MVP 2013

In December 2016 at Gotham's end-of-year awards night, Bonnie Thunders' jersey was retired by the league.
