= 2×4 Roller Derby =

Argentine roller derby league

2x4 Roller Derby
- Metro area: Buenos Aires
- Country: Argentina
- Founded: 2010
- Teams: Team Osom (A team); Lxs Pibxs (B team); Team C (C team); Bully Chicks; Cowgirls From Hell; Bloody Furias
- Track type: Flat
- Venue: Chacabuco Park
- Affiliations: WFTDA
- Website: www.2x4rollerderby.com.ar

2x4 Roller Derby (also Dos por cuatro: /ˌˈdɒs ˈpɒr ˈkwæˈtrɒ/) is a women's flat track roller derby league based in Buenos Aires, Argentina. Founded in 2010, the league consists of three teams that play against each other: Bully Chicks, Cowgirls From Hell and Bloody Furias. It is also represented by three travel teams (Team Osom, Lxs Pibxs and Team C) that play against travel teams from other leagues.

The name 2x4 is a reference to Tango, the typical music genre of Buenos Aires. In technical terms, Tango has binary form (theme and chorus) and a quadruple compass, so in Argentina it is known as "the two by four" (in Spanish: "dos por cuatro"). Hence, 2x4 Roller Derby.

2x4 Roller Derby is a member of the Women's Flat Track Derby Association (WFTDA), and as of October 2019, ranked 10th in the world as per WFTDA rankings.

In 2019, 2x4 became the first team from Latin America to qualify for WFTDA Championships.

== History ==
The league was founded in June 2010 as Roller Derby Argentina, but was soon renamed as the Bully Chicks Roller Derby, then by the end of the year as 2x4 Roller Derby. Bully Chicks was re-used as the name of one of its home teams, representing the city centre.

It is the first roller derby league in Argentina, and when the Argentina All Stars team was created to play in the 2011 Roller Derby World Cup, most of its skaters belonged to the league. The rest of the national squad were skaters based in the United States.

In April 2013, the league was accepted as a member of the Women's Flat Track Derby Association Apprentice Program. In February 2016, it was promoted to be a WFTDA Class C member, becoming the first WFTDA full member of Argentina.

== Team Osom ==
In August 2016, Team Osom visited the United States for the first time to play sanctioned bouts, so as to appear in the WFTDA rankings. In October 2016, WFTDA announced its September 30 rankings, where 2x4 Roller Derby debuted in 40th place, meaning a Division 1 debut.

In September 2017, Team Osom became the first Latin American team to participate in the WFTDA Division 1 Playoffs.

In September 2019, they also became the first Latin American team to qualify for WFTDA Championships.

=== 2016 ===
==== Season tour: Midwest Road Trip ====
During August 2016, Team Osom made their first tour in the United States playing WFTDA sanctioned games to become officially ranked. During the tour they visited Lincoln, Nebraska, Kansas City, Missouri and Oklahoma City. The first bout of the tour was a sanctioned game against No Coast Derby Girls (ranked 25th) for a 176-143 loss. It was the first time in the recorded history of the travel team to have ever lost a game.

In all, Team Osom played three sanctioned games and one Strength Factor Challenge game:

Source: WFTDA
Rival	Rank	Pts for	Pts against	GP earned
No Coast Derby Girls	25th	143	176	451.86
Kansas City Roller Warriors	50th	159	140	406.81
Arch Rival Roller Derby	8th	76	340	SFC
Oklahoma City Roller Derby	100th	324	48	402.39

The final game of the tour was the last WFTDA sanctioned bout of the Oklahoma City travel team, which merged with Oklahoma Victory Dolls on January 3, 2017.

As a result of the games played during this tour, 2x4 Roller Derby debuted in 40th place of the WFTDA rankings, meaning a Division 1 debut.

=== 2017 ===
==== Season tour: The Big O Tournament 2017 ====
Following its debut in Division 1, Team Osom received invitations to notable roller derby tournaments, and settled for the early-season Division 1 classic, The Big O Tournament, a roller derby invitational hosted by Emerald City Roller Girls of Eugene, Oregon. During the event, Team Osom played three sanctioned games:

Source: WFTDA
Rival	Rank	Pts for	Pts against	GP earned
Boulder County Bombers	57th	273	88	535.41
Windy City Rollers	38th	145	150	439.42
Helsinki Roller Derby	16th	113	203	432.33

The highlight of the tournament was the game against Windy City Rollers, which was described as a "nail biter" by the press. This game would eventually be praised, a rematch be expected and eventually fulfilled in the 2017 WFTDA Division 1 Playoffs. Lula Zan was voted the MVP of Team Osom by its rivals, and was invited to play the MVP Game against Team USA. Team Osom's coach was invited as guest coach for the MVP Team.

==== Postseason: WFTDA Playoffs (Seattle) ====
In 2017, 2×4 Roller Derby qualified for WFTDA Division 1 Playoffs for the first time as the eighth seed in Seattle, Washington, and won their opening game against Windy City Rollers, 178-135. They were then eliminated from the medals by a 360-80 loss to the Rose City Rollers, and finished their weekend by winning their consolation game against Ann Arbor Roller Derby 255-105.

=== 2018 ===
==== Season tour: Euro Tour ====
As most of the skaters of Team Osom also played for Team Argentina, the league decided to coordinate sanctioned games around the dates of the Roller Derby World Cup in Manchester so as to save costs of travel. They scheduled six sanctioned games in total in this tour (for before the World Cup, and two after). These games, added to those played by Team Argentina in the World Cup, meant that many of the skaters played a total of 13 games in a span of just 13 days.

Source: WFTDA
Rival	Rank	Pts for	Pts against	GP earned
Rainy City Roller Derby	12th	126	132	722.30
Auld Reekie Roller Derby	68th	316	53	688.52
Dublin Roller Derby	49th	242	64	647.71
Middlesbrough Roller Derby	60th	375	51	736.80
Paris Rollergirls	43rd	182	78	623.70
Bear City Roller Derby	39th	201	193	420.88

By the end of the 2018 regular season, Team Osom settled in the 18th place of the WFTDA Rankings and earned a spot in the postseason Division 1 Playoffs.

==== Postseason: WFTDA Playoffs (A Coruña) ====
In 2018, the team qualified for WFTDA Playoffs as the seventh seed in A Coruña, Spain, and opened their weekend by defeating Sailor City Rollers (10th seed) - also from Buenos Aires - by a score of 210-53. Upon losing the quarterfinals against Angel City Derby 125-218, 2×4 ended their weekend with a 208-172 victory over Helsinki Roller Derby in the consolation round, a very much expected rematch of the 2017 season game at The Big O.

=== 2019 ===
==== Season tour: Monsoon Madness ====
Team Osom toured Arizona and California for their 2019 regular season games. They participated in the Monsoon Madness Tournament hosted by Arizona Roller Derby, and played an extra game outside the event against Bay Area Derby.

Source: WFTDA
Rival	Rank	Pts for	Pts against	GP earned
Rat City Roller Derby	18th	106	90	807.08
Arizona Roller Derby	26th	122	101	686.66
Dallas Derby Devils	39th	295	26	952.09
Bay Area Derby	21st	176	134	748.86

This tour resulted in Team Osom securing an invitation to the 2019 International WFTDA Playoffs as a fourth seed and with a first round bye.

==== Postseason: WFTDA Playoffs (Winston-Salem) ====
In 2019, 2×4 participated in the WFTDA Playoffs as the fourth seed in Winston-Salem, North Carolina, with a first round bye. They played their first game in the quarterfinals against twelfth-seeded Paris Rollergirls in a rematch from their 2018 season European game. Upon winning the round, they lost to Texas Rollergirls 143-58 in the semifinals. They finished the tournament by winning the bronze medal against Rainy City Roller Derby, another rematch from the European tour, with a 172-109 victory. 2×4 Roller Derby thus qualified for the 2019 WFTDA Championships, becoming the first Latin-American team to do so.

== WFTDA Rankings ==
Season	Final ranking	Playoffs	Championship
2016	40 WFTDA	DNQ	DNQ
2017	21 WFTDA	CR D1	DNQ
2018	15 WFTDA	CR	DNQ

- CR = consolation round

== Other titles ==
Competitions outside WFTDA postseason
Year	Location	Competition	Team	Standing
2012	Buenos Aires	Torneo Violentango 1	Team Osom	1st
2013	Bogotá	Torneo Latinoamericano	Team Osom	1st
2013	Buenos Aires	Torneo Violentango 2	Team Osom	1st
2014	Buenos Aires	Torneo Violentango 3	Team Osom	1st
2015	Sao Paulo	Torneo Latinoamericano	Team Osom	1st
2015	Buenos Aires	Torneo Violentango 4	Team Osom	1st
2017	Buenos Aires	Torneo Violentango 5	Team Osom	1st
2017	Ushuaia	Patagonia Rebelde	Team C	1st
