= Team New Zealand Roller Derby =

National roller derby team of New Zealand

- Founded: 2011
- League: Roller Derby World Cup
- Colours: Black and white
- Head coach: Mick Swagger (coaching manager); Bruiser (assistant coach); Justass For All (assistant coach)
- Manager: Ana Phylaxis
- Championships: 8th place at 2011 Roller Derby World Cup, 5th place at 2014 Roller Derby World Cup
- Broadcasters: Derby News Network
- Website: www.rollerderby.org.nz/the-team/

Team New Zealand Roller Derby is the New Zealand national women's flat track roller derby team. It was founded in 2011 to compete in the inaugural Roller Derby World Cup. There was a brief name change to Aotearoa Roller Derby for the 2018 Roller Derby World Cup but the league changed back to its original name in October 2020.

== 2011 World Cup campaign ==
Roller Derby Team New Zealand competed in the inaugural Roller Derby World Cup, held 1–4 December 2011 in Toronto, Canada.

=== Selection and build-up ===
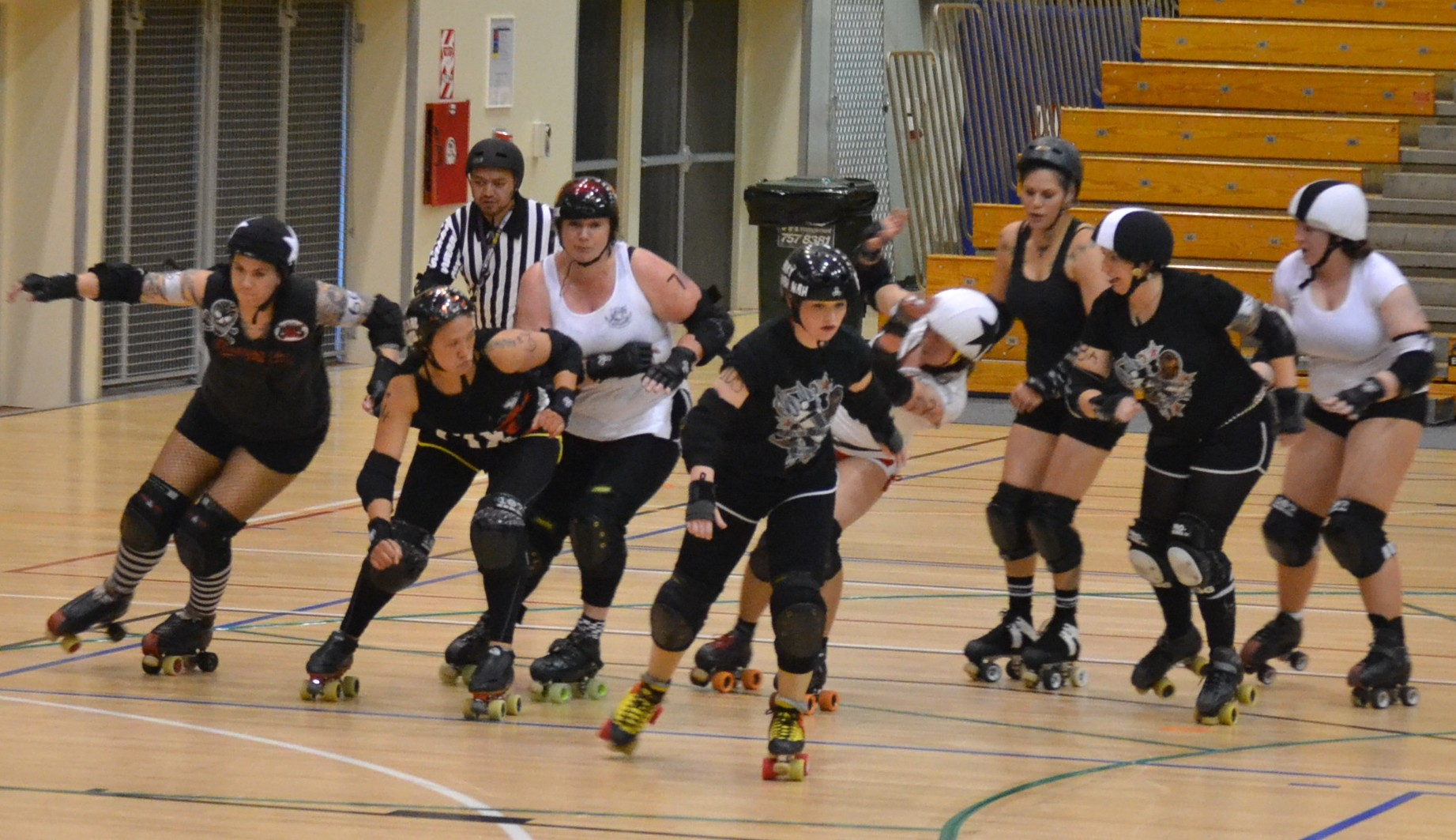
Roller Derby Team New Zealand Probables v. Possibles bout, 22 October 2011. World Cup MVP, Skate the Muss, second from left.

Roller derby skaters throughout New Zealand were invited to try out for places in the training squad.

The squad met monthly to train in Hamilton. Final selections for the team to travel to Toronto for the 2011 Roller Derby World Cup were released after a final training and selection bout between the "Probables" and the "Possibles" in New Plymouth in conjunction with the AoteaRUMBLE roller derby training retreat.

=== Competition ===
Team New Zealand was drawn in Group C, with Team USA and Team Scotland.

- In their first bout, Team New Zealand was beaten 377:8 by Team USA.
- In their second bout, Team New Zealand beat Team Scotland 124:111.

Team New Zealand was ranked 9th after the group stage.

- In the first round of the Elimination stage, Team New Zealand beat Team Germany 142:127.
- In the quarter-final round, Team New Zealand was beaten by Team USA 470:8.

Team New Zealand entered the Consolation Stage at Round 2.

- In Round 2, Team New Zealand was beaten 94:66 by Team Sweden.
- In the Placement Round, Team New Zealand was beaten 180:129 by Team France.

Team New Zealand finished the World Cup in 8th place.

Skate the Muss was awarded the title of MVP for the team.

=== 2011 team roster ===
Team New Zealand logo, 2011

The travel team for the 2011 World Cup was announced on Tuesday 25 October 2011. (Skaters' league affiliations as of the time of the announcement)

Number	Name	League
	Axl-Slash-R	Northland Nightmares
	Bad Jelly the Bitch	Pirate City Rollers
	Big Mack	Pirate City Rollers
	Black Panther	Dead End Derby
	Evil K'Neevil	Dead End Derby
	Fia Fasi Oe?	Pirate City Rollers
	Hurricane Hori (Captain)	Pirate City Rollers
	Lawless Mess	Dead End Derby
	Miss Chevus Mynx	Dead End Derby
	Miss Metal Militia	Hellmilton Roller Ghouls
	Pentakill	Pirate City Rollers
	Perky Nah Nah	Pirate City Rollers
	Pieces of Hate	Pirate City Rollers
	Poison Petal	Hellmilton Roller Ghouls
	Poison Pixie	Mount Militia Derby Crew
	Skate the Muss	Pirate City Rollers
	Solid Sarge	Northland Nightmares
	Terror Satana	Pirate City Rollers
	Tuff Bikkies	Richter City Roller Derby
	Pieces of Hate (head coach)	Pirate City Rollers
	Fia Fasi Oe? (assistant coach)	Pirate City Rollers
	Elle Qaeda (manager)	Pirate City Rollers

== 2014 World Cup campaign ==
Roller Derby Team New Zealand competed in the 2014 Roller Derby World Cup, held in Dallas, Texas on 4–6 December 2014.

=== Selection and build-up ===
The selection process for the 2014 team was fraught with controversy. The first issue was the decision by the New Zealand Roller Derby Association (NZRDA) to require that the coach of the team not be a skating member of the team. As roller derby is a young and rapidly evolving sport, this considerably restricted the pool of candidates for the position as most of the people with the best understanding of the rules, tactics and other requirements of the current state of the game were active skaters with a reasonable expectation of being selected to play. Stacey "Pieces of Hate" Roper was appointed to coach the team. Zephyr and Fia Fase Oi? were appointed selectors alongside the coach and Danger Spouse was appointed team manager. Zephyr was also appointed assistant coach.

Try-outs to select a 30-player development squad were held in Auckland, Wellington and Christchurch in December 2013. The squad was announced on 23 January 2013 and trained in various locations throughout the country. The final squad of 20 were announced on 9 October 2014.

==== Bullying and discrimination controversy ====
In early October the team manager was removed from her role by the NZRDA board. In a statement to the New Zealand roller derby community she cited "abuse and defamation" from the head coach as contributing to her failure in the role, saying "the entire situation was very unhealthy for me and after a complete failure to effect real improvement I went into emotional hiding".

On 24 October 2014, New Zealand's television 3 News published an interview with Marcia "Meat Train" Taylor about a discrimination complaint she had filed with the Human Rights Commission directed toward the team's head coach. The complaint alleged that Roper had published comments about Taylor on her Pieces of Hate Facebook fan page which showed that Taylor had been unlawfully discriminated against in the selection process because she was hard of hearing. The comment was subsequently removed.

An official statement released on 25 October 2014 by the New Zealand Roller Derby Association (NZRDA)'s Facebook page drew substantial criticism and condemnation from the New Zealand roller derby community. When the situation received attention from international blogs, the NZRDA removed their statements and associated comments from all social media channels; a move that many felt made matters worse. The statement was then displayed on the NZRDA's website, where visitors were unable to leave any public comments or feedback, leading to accusations of censorship.

On 27 October, a Change.org petition was started that called for the immediate dismissal of Stacey Roper as the head coach of Team NZ Roller Derby. The petition was not effective. Roper remained coach and accompanied the team to the 2014 Roller Derby World Cup.

Taylor was invited to join one of two International Vagine Regime (LGBT) teams playing an exhibition game at the World Cup. Taylor's Pangina team won the clash, beating Queerope 260:182.

A feedback survey was circulated within the New Zealand roller derby community in December 2014, but while respondents were thanked for their feedback, no further public statements were made. Several leagues resigned from the NZRDA in the wake of the affair, leaving the association effectively defunct. The NZRDA website registration lapsed in July 2015.

=== Competition ===
Team New Zealand was drawn in Group A, with Team Wales, Team Norway and Team South Africa.

Team New Zealand won all three of their games to emerge top of their group.

In the Round of 16 the team faced the Netherlands, winning 356:91 and advancing to the quarter-finals in fifth position.

In the quarter-finals they lost 284:56 to Australia, who ultimately placed third, finishing the tournament in fifth place.

=== 2014 team roster ===
The travel team for the 2014 Roller Derby World Cup was announced on 9 October 2014. (Skaters' league affiliations as of the time of the announcement)

Number	Name	League
	Terror Satana (C)	Pirate City Rollers (Auckland, NZ)
	Justass For All (C)	Swamp City Roller Rats (Palmerston North, NZ)
	Elicia Nisbet-Smith	Rose City Rollers (Portland, USA)
	Hannah Jennings	Rose City Rollers (Portland, USA)
	Tank-U	Paradise City Roller Derby (Gold Coast, AUS)
	Ivy K'nivey	Victorian Roller Derby League (Melbourne, AUS)
	Serious Crash Unit	Otautahi Roller Derby League (Christchurch, NZ)
	Nicki Noxious	Rogue Rollers (Dunedin, NZ)
	Evil K. Neevil	Dead End Derby (Christchurch, NZ)
	Jem Molition	Richter City Roller Derby (Wellington, NZ)
	Renee Brown	Swamp City Roller Rats(Palmerston North, NZ)
	Anna Pave-U'Ova	Richter City Roller Derby (Wellington, NZ)
	Ashlee Mackenzie	Richter City Roller Derby(Wellington, NZ)
	Melicious Mayhem	River City Roller (Wanganui, NZ)
	Lady Trample	Pirate City Rollers (Auckland, NZ)
	Fia Fasi Oe?	K-Town Derby Dolls (Kawerau, NZ)
	Miss Metal Militia	Hellmilton Roller Ghouls (Hamilton, NZ)
	Miss Crunchbull	Hellmilton Roller Ghouls (Hamilton, NZ)
	Jordon Leah Parore (Skate the Muss)	Pirate City Rollers (Auckland, NZ)
	Coup D'eTalia	Pirate City Rollers (Auckland, NZ)
	OrKazzmic (non-traveling alternate)	Dunedin Derby (Dunedin, NZ)
	Diva DemolisHer (non-traveling alternate)	Dunedin Derby (Dunedin, NZ)
	Pieces of Hate (head coach)	N/A
	Zephyr (team selector/assistant coach)	N/A
	Karen Edwards (team manager)	N/A

== 2018 World Cup campaign ==
New Zealand was named as one of the 40 teams to compete in the 2018 Roller Derby World Cup to be held in Manchester, UK.

=== Team New Zealand organisation ===
With no national body or group set up to manage the 2018 Roller Derby World Cup campaign following the collapse of the NZRDA, Team New Zealand veterans Terror Satana and Justass For All began the process of organising volunteers to create an executive group to oversee the campaign, including management, coaching, and selection.

Members from top-level competitive New Zealand leagues including the Pirate City Rollers, Richter City Roller Derby, Dead End Derby, Dunedin Derby, Auckland Roller Derby League, Whakatāne Roller Derby League, and Swamp City Roller Derby were nominated to represent their respective leagues' interests and formed the Team New Zealand Executive Committee in June 2016. This followed an earlier proposal sent to all New Zealand roller derby leagues proposing that this committee be formed.

Later that year, the executive committee opened applications for coaching manager, assistant coach (x2), and team selector (x2) to form the Coaching & Selection sub-committee. Team USA and Victorian Roller Derby League veteran skater and coach Mick Swagger was selected as coaching manager; Justass For All from Swamp City Roller Derby and Bruiser from Dead End Derby were named assistant coaches; and Sugar Hit from Pirate City Rollers and Baddy from Dead End Derby were announced as team selectors.

==== Team New Zealand try-outs and squad selection ====
Try-outs to select from an initial pool of 50 skaters were held in Auckland, Palmerston North, and Christchurch in December 2016. That initial squad was announced on 2 January 2016. A second selection to cut the squad from 50 to 32 skaters took place over one weekend in February 2016, with the selection and announcement of that squad made at the same time. The process and selection of the 32 skaters drew criticism on social media, which the Team New Zealand Executive Committee responded to by introducing changes to their selection policy and process. A final selection to choose 20 skaters from the 32-strong squad for the World Cup charter was completed in July, with the final squad of 20 announced on 18 July 2017.

=== 2018 team roster ===
(Skaters' league affiliations as of the time of the announcement)

Number	Name	League
	Anna Pave-U'Ova	Victorian Roller Derby League (Melbourne, AU)
	Axle Rosé	Dunedin Derby (Dunedin, NZ)
	Ballistic Button	Pirate City Rollers (Auckland, NZ)
	Coup D'eTalia	Pirate City Rollers (Auckland, NZ)
	EVenger	Bay City Rollers (Napier, NZ)
	Evil K. Neevil	Dead End Derby (Christchurch, NZ)
	Hui	Pirate City Rollers (Auckland, NZ)
	Ivy K'nivey	Victorian Roller Derby League (Melbourne, AUS)
	Justass For All	Swamp City Roller Derby (Palmerston North, NZ)
	Lady Trample	Victorian Roller Derby League (Melbourne, AU)
	Little Yellow Jacket	Dunedin Derby (Dunedin, NZ)
	Mackenzie	Auckland Roller Derby League(Auckland, NZ)
	maDD Honour	Swamp City Roller Derby (Palmerston North, NZ)
	Maggie Mayhem	Dead End Derby (Christchurch, NZ)
	McFeerce	Whakatāne Roller Derby League (Whakatane, NZ)
	Riley (Papercut)	Pirate City Rollers (Auckland, NZ)
	Sugar Hit	Pirate City Rollers (Auckland, NZ)
	Terror Satana	Auckland Roller Derby League(Auckland, NZ)
	Tuff Bikkies	Richter City Roller Derby (Wellington, NZ)
	TutanKarnage	Pirate City Rollers (Auckland, NZ)
	Mick Swagger (coaching manager)	N/A
	Bruiser (assistant coach)	N/A
	Ana Phylaxis (team manager)	N/A

== Renaming and rebranding to Aotearoa Roller Derby ==
After a Team New Zealand training in June, the 32-skater squad, the Coaching & Selection Committee, and the executive committee collectively agreed to rename the team from 'Team New Zealand Roller Derby' to 'Aotearoa Roller Derby.' The executive committee released a statement about the decision, saying that "roller derby communities here and abroad have led the way in terms of progressive inclusivity [and] New Zealand’s roller derby team are proud to continue that tradition by fully embracing our country’s indigenous name". The move was widely praised on social media.

In October 2020, an announcement was made on the team's Facebook page that they would be reverting to the name Team New Zealand Roller Derby after discussions with Mana Tangata o Aotearoa Roller Derby, the national Māori roller derby team.
