= Suzy Hotrod =

American roller derby skater

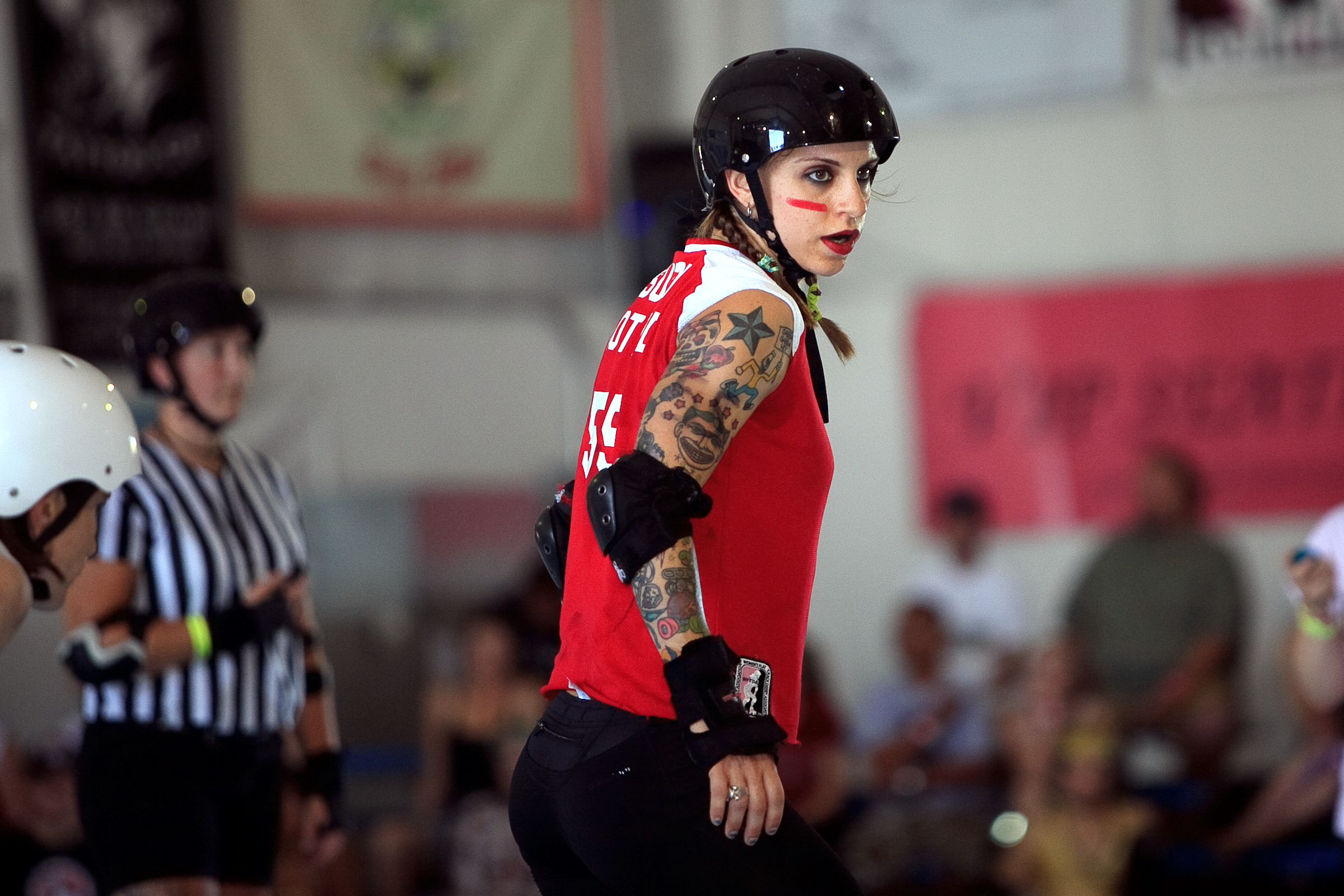

Personal information
- Birth name: Jean Schwarzwalder
- Nationality: American
- Born: 1980 (age 44–45)
- Height: 5 ft 7 in (1.70 m)
- Weight: 150 lb (68 kg)

Sport
- Sport: Roller derby
- Club: Gotham Roller Derby
- Team: Queens of Pain, GGRD All Stars

Jean Schwarzwalder (born 1980), known as Suzy Hotrod, is a roller derby skater.

== Early life ==
Born in Lindenwold, New Jersey, Hotrod began skating in 2004, soon after leaving college, having not previously exercised for four years. Training with the Gotham Girls Roller Derby league, she was immediately picked out as a potential jammer. At the time, she worked as a photo editor, and played guitar in the punk band Lady Unluck.

== Career ==
By 2007, Hotrod was captain of Gotham's "Queens of Pain" team.

Also in 2007, Hotrod worked with Tibbie X on a pop-punk band called "Kissy Kamikaze." Hotrod's name is mentioned on this album in the "intro," and the album later talks about Roller Derby in their song "Roller Derby Riot GO! (Skate 2 Hell)" Their first album would later be re-released by Tibbie's son, Severin. Their band was recorded playing their song "Doucebag" on youtube. Hotrod is seen playing an instrument and singing backing vocals.

After the 2010 WFTDA Championships, Hotrod was expected to move to Philadelphia, and leave the Gotham Girls. However, her work plans changed, and she remained with Gotham.

Hotrod was appointed co-captain of Team USA for the inaugural Roller Derby World Cup.

Hotrod is also the host of the radio show Rock and Roller Derby on Jersey City-based WFMU.

== Recognition ==
Hotrod won the Gotham Girls' Most Valuable Player award in both 2006 and 2009, has captained the Queens of Pain to three league titles, and won the Derby News Network readers' award for Best Double Threat in 2010. and again in 2011.

A jersey worn by Suzy Hotrod is in the collection of the National Museum of American History of the Smithsonian Institution.
