= Tilted Thunder Rail Birds =

Roller derby league

Tilted Thunder Roller Derby (Formerly Tilted Thunder Rail Birds)
- Metro area: Seattle, Washington
- Country: United States
- Founded: 2008
- Teams: Rolling Blackouts; Royal Crush; Saint Hellions; Skulls; All Star Travel Team
- Track type: Banked
- Affiliations: RDCL
- Org. type: 501(c)(3) Nonprofit Organization
- Website: http://www.tiltedthunder.org/

Tilted Thunder Roller Derby (TTRD), formerly Tilted Thunder Rail Birds, is a Seattle, Washington based banked track roller derby league. They are a 501(c)(3) nonprofit organization.

== Overview ==
TTRD is one of only a handful of modern DIY banked track leagues in the entire country. Many DIY leagues have already built their own banked tracks: Los Angeles Derby Dolls, San Diego Derby Dolls, and Arizona Derby Dames (Phoenix). In fact, while there are over 400 flat-track leagues in the United States, TTRD was only the 7th roller derby league to build a banked track in the nation. TTRD is also a 501(c)(3) nonprofit organization.

Tilted Thunder currently skates as one home team and an All Star travel team.

Tilted Thunder is a founding member of the Roller Derby Coalition of Leagues.

== Teams ==
Tilted Thunder is one of several active banked track roller derby leagues in the country. The skaters bout under the Roller Derby Coalition of Leagues (RDCL). Between 2008 and 2011, Tilted Thunder was made up of two teams: Red Team and Purple Team. In 2011, the first season featured four current intra-league competitors:

- The Rolling Blackouts

Season 1 Champions
Season 2 Champions
Season 5 Champions

- Royal Crush
- Saint Hellions

Season 3 Champions
Season 4 Champions
Season 6 Champions

- Sugar Skulls

Skaters who do not skate on home teams are called "Chicks." They hone their skills in the "Chick Pool" until a home team drafts them.

The All Star team is TTRD's travel team.

== Peeps and Chicklets (Junior's Program) ==
Tilted Thunder expanded banked track roller derby to young women in January 2011.

Chicklets

Chicklets are for girls age 6 to 13.

Peeps

Peeps range from 11 to 17 years old. Additionally, they play full contact roller derby.

== Battle on the Bank ==
June 1–3, 2012, the Tilted Thunder Rail Birds hosted Battle on the Bank V, the US Banked Track Roller Derby National Tournament. The tournament returned to the Pacific Northwest (PNW) again on June 5–7, 2015 and June 1–3, 2018. Both the Battle on the Bank VIII and BotB XI were hosted by TTRD at the Evergreen State Fairgrounds, Monroe, WA.

Tilted Thunder has participated in Battle on the Bank since 2010. TTRD All-Stars placed 3rd in Battle on the Bank VII and VIII. The Peeps All-Stars placed 1st for the first time in Battle on the Bank VIII.

== Community Involvement ==
Tilted Thunder Roller Derby engages in community volunteer projects. Recent activities include:

• Green Seattle Partnership - Cleaned the Burke-Gilman trail of trash and blackberry bushes.
• Relay for Life - raised money for Cancer Survivors.
• Pennies for Peace - collected pennies for education opportunities for children in Pakistan and Afghanistan.
• Save your A@* for the Track- Tilted Thunder hosted a self defense class taught by Joanna Factor with Strategic Living.
• Harborview Medical Center- Collected toiletries for ICU Patient family members.
• Parent Child Assistance Program-toy and gift drive.
• Northwest Harvest- Collected food for Seattle food banks.
• Second Harvest Japan- Skate for Japan fundraiser at Lynnwood to aid those devastated by the Japanese earthquake.
• Bellevue Arthritis Walk 2011- TTRD skaters led the walk at Crossroads Park on May 21, 2011
• Toys for Tots - Toy drive
• Housing Hope - Toiletry drive

== See also ==
- List of roller derby leagues
- History of roller derby
