= FMDG =

FMDG may stand for:

- Fargo Moorhead Derby Girls, roller derby league based in North Dakota
- Fort Myers Derby Girls, roller derby league based in Florida
