= Chacabuco Department =

Chacabuco Department may refer to:

- Chacabuco Department, Chaco
- Chacabuco Department, San Luis
