= 2025 Roller Derby World Cup =

International roller derby tournament

- 2025

Tournament information
- Sport: Roller derby
- Location: Innsbruck, Austria
- Dates: July 3, 2025–July 6, 2025
- Host: Fearless Bruisers Roller Derby Innsbruck
- Venue: OlympiaWorld Innsbruck
- Teams: 48 teams
- Website: rollerderbyworldcup.com

Final positions
- Champions: United States
- 1st runners-up: Australia
- 2nd runners-up: England

Tournament statistics
- MVP: Pulp Friction (Australia)
- Best Jammer: La Moche (France)

The 2025 Roller Derby World Cup is the fourth international women's Roller Derby World Cup, taking place from 3–6 July 2025 at OlympiaWorld Innsbruck in Austria, with 48 teams competing. An international roller derby tournament, it is organised by a dedicated planning committee, and the 2025 edition is hosted by Fearless Bruisers Roller Derby.

== Participating teams ==
- Argentina
- Australia
- Austria
- Babushka
- Belgium
- Black Diaspora
- Brazil
- Canada
- Chile
- Chinese Nations
- Colombia
- Czech Republic
- Denmark
- Desi
- England
- Finland
- France
- Fuego Latino
- Germany
- Greece
- Iceland
- Indigenous Rising
- Ireland
- Italy
- Japan
- Jewish Roller Derby
- Korea
- Latvia
- Mexico
- Netherlands
- New Zealand
- Norway
- Philippines
- Poland
- Portugal
- Puerto Rico
- SALAAM
- Scotland
- Slovenia
- South Africa
- Spain
- Sweden
- Switzerland
- Taiwan
- United States
- Vietnam
- Wales
- West Indies

== Knockout stage results ==
Quarterfinals
2	Australia	145
3	Canada	86
4	England	142
6	Argentina	80
5	France	138
8	Sweden	109
1	United States	378
15	Belgium	34

Semifinals
2	Australia	133
4	England	117
1	United States	226
5	France	63

Finals
1	United States	208
2	Australia	55
Third place
4	England	149
5	France	84
