= Argentina All Stars =

- Founded: 2011
- Colors: Blue, white and black
- Head coach: Mono Loco
- Championships: 8th place at 2014 Roller Derby World Cup
- Broadcasters: Derby News Network
- Website: http://www.seleccionargentinard.com/

The Argentina All Stars represent Argentina in women's international roller derby. The team was first formed to compete at the 2011 Roller Derby World Cup, and finished the tournament in last place, out of thirteen teams. They improved on this placing at the 2014 edition, finishing 8th overall.

== Team roster ==
=== 2017 ===
As of November 2017, Team Argentina is composed of the following active skaters:

#	Skater	League	Notes
03	Temis	2x4 Roller Derby	
13	Capitan Barbosa	Sailor City Rollers	
138	Trouble	Sailor City Rollers	
1953	Mad Flaca	No Excuses Roller Derby	
1984	Hulka	No Excuses Roller Derby	
20	Negra Manija	Wonderclan Roller Derby	
24	Ladrillo	2x4 Roller Derby	
26	Tropical Mecánica	2x4 Roller Derby	
265	Lula Zan	2x4 Roller Derby	
27	Paoli	2x4 Roller Derby	
28	Julisuelta	2x4 Roller Derby	
35	Cureya	2x4 Roller Derby	
45	Maki Lombera	2x4 Roller Derby	
47	AK	2x4 Roller Derby	
609	Qamola	2x4 Roller Derby	
7	Rayo	2x4 Roller Derby	
8	Papap	2x4 Roller Derby	
80	Francesa	Sailor City Rollers	
95	Manija	Dublin Roller Derby	
99	Chinaski	2x4 Roller Derby	

=== 2016 ===
In April 2016, Team Argentina underwent a major restructuring with new open Tryouts. The following skaters passed the tryouts and became part of the national team, road to the 2018 Roller Derby World Cup in Manchester.

#	Skater	League
0077	Trans-former	Buenos Aires Roller Derby
03	Temis	Volcanicas Roller Derby
10	INI	Sailor City Rollers
11	Branca Nieves	Buenos Aires Roller Derby
12	Magic	Sailor City Rollers
13	Capitan Barbosa	Sailor City Rollers
131	Phoenix	Sailor City Rollers
138	Trouble	Sailor City Rollers
147	Furious	Dirty Fucking Dolls
15	Warrior	Buenos Aires Roller Derby
1953	Mad Flaca	No Excuses Roller Derby
1984	Hulka	No Excuses Roller Derby
20	Negra Manija	Wonderclan Roller Derby
24	Ladrillo	Buenos Aires Roller Derby
26	Power Yan	Wonderclan Roller Derby
26	Tropical Mecánica	2x4 Roller Derby
265	Lula Zan	2x4 Roller Derby
27	Cruciatus	Alianza Rebelde Roller Derby
28	La Julisuelta	Volcanicas Roller Derby
33	Medusa	Sailor City Rollers
35	Cureya	2x4 Roller Derby
45	Maki Lombera	2x4 Roller Derby
47	AK	Buenos Aires Roller Derby
5	Guacha	Buenos Aires Roller Derby
609	Qamola	Buenos Aires Roller Derby
7	Rayo	2x4 Roller Derby
8	Papap (C)	2x4 Roller Derby
80	Francesa	Sailor City Rollers
85	Elysian Fields	Wonderclan Roller Derby
93	Kumbia Nena	Sailor City Rollers
95	Manija	Dublin Roller Derby
99	Chinaski	2x4 Roller Derby

=== 2014 ===
Argentina competed at the 2014 Roller Derby World Cup with skaters from the following training roster:

#	Skater	League	Notes
04	Bondiola	Dirty Fucking Dolls	
06	Huevo	Sailor City Rollers	
101	Bel Fast	Cougar Rollers	DNQ
13	Capitan Barbosa	Sailor City Rollers	
131	L'Pache	2x4 Roller Derby	DNQ
138	Trouble	Sailor City Rollers	
14	Gedienta	Cougar Rollers	DNQ
147	Furious	Dirty Fucking Dolls	
1744	Turbonegra	2x4 Roller Derby	
1953	Mad Flaca	2x4 Roller Derby	
1980	Hulka	2x4 Roller Derby	DNQ
22	Arson Tina	Gotham Girls Roller Derby	
25	Nina Brava	Complot Derby Club	
26	Tropical Mecanica	Alianza Rebelde Roller Derby	
265	Lula Zan	2x4 Roller Derby	
3	Pixie Rage	Cougar Rollers	DNQ
33	Bombal	Sailor City Rollers	
35	Cruella Overkill	Bloody Furias Roller Derby	
428	Beetlejuice	2x4 Roller Derby	DNQ
43	Vandelay	Sailor City Rollers	DNQ
45	Maki Lombera	2x4 Roller Derby	
49	Holy Hooker	Dirty Fucking Dolls	DNQ
52	Sargentina	Windy City Rollers	
609	Sinner	Cougar Rollers	
707	Teniente Dan	Sailor City Rollers	DNQ
71	Animal	2x4 Roller Derby	
8	Papap	Mambas Negras Roller Derby	
93	Kumbia Nena	Sailor City Rollers	
95	Manija	Mambas Negras Roller Derby	
999	Destripadora	Alianza Rebelde Roller Derby	DNQ

=== 2011 team ===
Several team members struggled to obtain appropriate equipment in advance of the World Cup; a benefit was organised by the Derby News Network, and various sponsors donated kit to the team. However, Nina Brava, one of the team's skaters, claimed that Argentina had an advantage in that they had been able to practise together for more hours than their opponents.

After the group stage of the World Cup, Argentina were ranked twelfth, with no wins. They then lost narrowly to Team Scotland, by 114 points to 91, thereby finishing the tournament in last place.

2011 Team Argentina Roller Derby logo

Argentina announced its initial team roster in August 2011:

#	Skater	League
2–2	Arson Tina	Gotham Girls Roller Derby
17	Barbie Turik	2x4 Roller Derby
36	Chargin' Tina	Los Angeles Derby Dolls
24	Crazy Legs	Queen City Roller Girls
70	Disturbio Santo	2x4 Roller Derby
10	Ini	2x4 Roller Derby
	Maga Lee	2x4 Roller Derby
45	MAKIavelica	2x4 Roller Derby
	Minx X Vixen	2x4 Roller Derby
39	MissVik	2x4 Roller Derby
25	Nina Brava	2x4 Roller Derby
1920	Rosie the Ribhitter	Houston Roller Derby
52	Sargentina	Windy City Rollers
19	Sun of the Beach	2x4 Roller Derby
1744	Turbonegra	2x4 Roller Derby
	White Rabbit	2x4 Roller Derby
