= Lady Trample =

Personal information
- Nickname: Lady Trample
- Nationality: New Zealand
- Born: Samara Pepperell; 1991 (age 34–35) Auckland, New Zealand

Sport
- Country: New Zealand
- Sport: Roller derby
- Club: WFTDA; Pirate City Rollers (2012-16); Victorian Roller Derby League (2016-2018); Denver Roller Derby (2019-present)
- Team: Pirate City All Scars (2012-16); VRDL All-Stars (2016-2018); Mile High Club (2019-present)

Achievements and titles
- Regional finals: WFTDA Division 1 Playoffs winner: 2016, 2017
- National finals: WFTDA Championships winner 2017

Samara Buscovick (née Pepperell; born 1991), known as Lady Trample, is a roller derby skater from New Zealand. Winner of the Most Valuable Player award at the 2017 WFTDA Championships, she is also the founder of the Chicks in Bowls (now Community in Bowls, CIB for short) organisation.

Born as Samara Pepperell in Auckland in New Zealand, Lady Trample worked as a graphic designer with a fibre company. She began roller skating with a friend in 2011, and the experience of learning led her to form Chicks in Bowls, initially a small group of friends who attended skate parks. The brand grew rapidly, and by 2014 there were more than 120 chapters on five continents.

In 2012, Trample joined the local Pirate City Rollers, and was soon rostered to play for the league. She chose the derby name "Lady Trample" from her love of Disney films, punning on The Lady and the Tramp. The league won the 2013 New Zealand Championship, at which she was named the tournament's Most Valuable Player. At the 2014 Roller Derby World Cup, she played for Team New Zealand.

Trample transferred to the Victorian Roller Derby League (VRDL) in 2016, moving to Melbourne in Australia. This represented a significant step up in level of play from Pirate City, and in 2017 the league won the WFTDA Championships, the first non-U.S. league to do so. Trample was named Most Valuable Player of the tournament.

Trample competed for the renamed Aotearoa Roller Derby at the 2018 Roller Derby World Cup, at which she won the Tournament Fan Favourite award.

During the 2018-2019 off-season, Trample moved to Denver, Colorado, and transferred to Denver Roller Derby.

On 29 September 2019, Trample married Denver Roller Derby teammate Hillary Buscovick, known as Scald Eagle. A bout was held the previous day in which each bride-to-be fielded a team of all-stars, with the winning bride keeping her surname in the marriage. The "BuscoVictors" defeated the "Red Hot Chilli Pepperells" 200-197, and so Lady Trample adopted Buscovick as her surname.

On 26 July 2021, Trample announced that she would be moving back home to Aotearoa (New Zealand) on 17 August 2021.
