= Julie Glass =

American speed skater (born 1979)

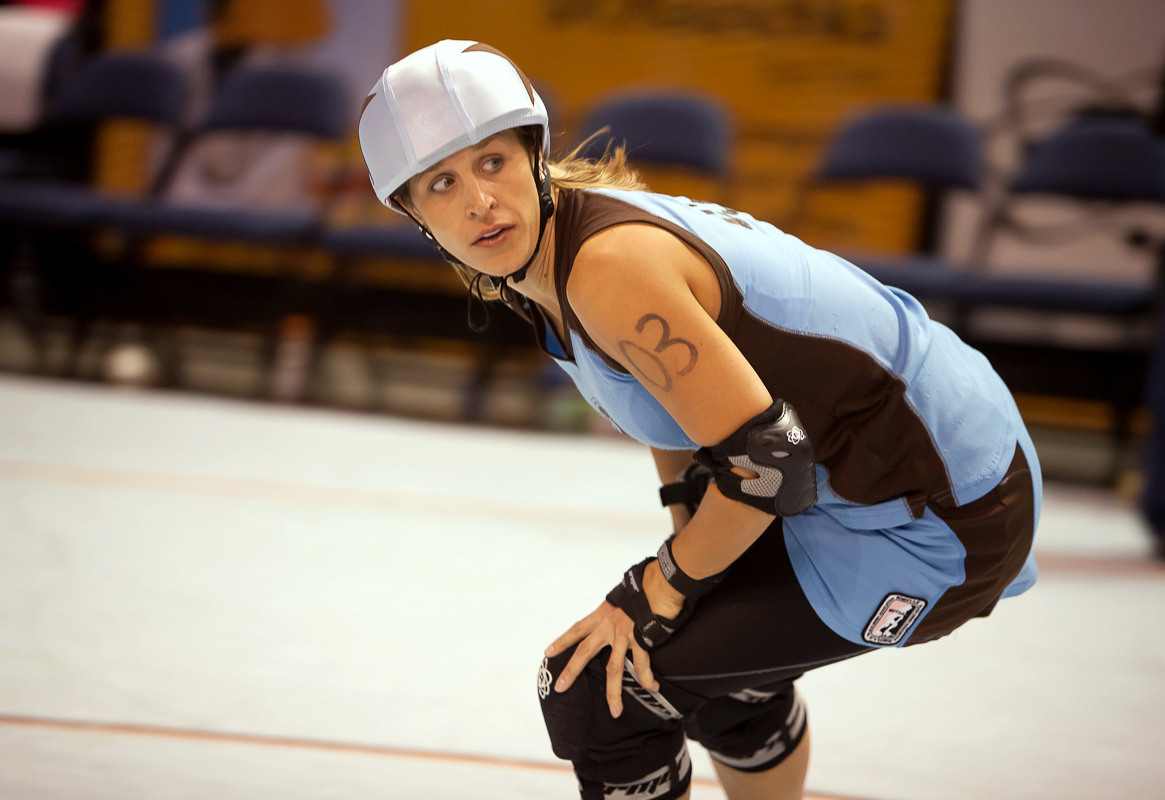

Personal information
- Nickname: Atomatrix
- Nationality: American
- Born: Julie Brandt; 23 February 1979 (age 47) Grand Rapids, Michigan
- Height: 5 ft 6 in (1.68 m)

Sport
- Sport: Roller derby, Speed skating
- Club: Arizona Roller Derby; Team USA 2011–2014

Julie Brandt Glass (born 23 February 1979), known as Atomatrix, is a former U.S. roller derby skater, and a former competitive speed skater.

== Inline skating ==
Born in Grand Rapids, Michigan as Julie Brandt, she took up inline speed skating, and won two gold medals at the U.S. Olympic Festival in 1995. She was overall sprint champion at the U.S. nationals that year, and again in 1998, also winning the Downer's Grove Championship in 1996 and 1998, and taking a gold medal at the World Cup in 1997. She took a break from skating during which she married Doug Glass, a fellow speed skater, then returned to win a silver medal at the 1999 Pan American Games. She also competed at the X Games, taking gold in the women's downhill inline skating at the 1998 event, won gold at the 2003 Pan American Games, and at the 2003 Berlin Roller Marathon.

Glass took another break from skating in 2002, during which time she and her husband ran a roller rink and drive-through coffee shop in Lebanon, Oregon. After watching the 2002 Winter Olympics, she began training as an ice speed skater, quickly gaining a place on the U.S. team, training in Calgary and entering some World Cup events, despite her lack of experience in the sport. However, she decided that she lacked the motivation to excel in the discipline, and returned to inline skating.

== Roller derby ==
Glass subsequently moved to Olympia, Washington, working with her husband on their Atom Wheels business, and gave birth to twins in 2007. The following year, she attended the WFTDA Championships of roller derby, and decided to take up the sport, under the derby name "Atomatrix". She joined the local Oly Rollers league, and was a key member of their team which won the Championships in 2009.

As Atomatrix, she was selected for Team USA at the 2011 Roller Derby World Cup. Glass moved to Arizona and skated with Arizona Roller Derby's Tent City Terrors team. On August 21, 2012, it was announced that she would be leaving AZRD to return to the Oly Rollers. The transfer caused much debate, since Atomatrix was still living in Arizona while skating for the Oly Rollers. 2013 found Glass back on her inlines and competed at the World Championships in Oostende, Belgium after 8 years off. A top 8 finish in the 500 meter on the road and top American finisher in the Marathon. By 2014 Glass was back skating on Team USA and the Arizona Tent City Terrors.

== Personal life ==
Glass' brother, David Brandt, has played in the National Football League.

Glass has been a proud representative of international multi-level marketing (MLM) company Arbonne since December 2019. Glass and her husband are co-owners of Mota Skates, LLC, a rebranding of their prior business enterprise, Atom Gear, that went bankrupt in 2015. In June 2020, Glass and Mota Skates came under fire for posting racially inflammatory graphics across multiple social media platforms. Initially, Glass and her husband responded to the widespread accusations of racism with an apology, writing:

Mota Skates, Doug and Julie Glass sincerely apologize for our ignorance regarding the black lives movement. We are working with others in the community to better ourselves in support of BLM. Your voices are heard. We are open to positive criticism that will continue to improve the movement. We will continue to reach out as we navigate this very sensitive matter. We understand this is not enough and we will continue our support to the best of our knowledge and provide more information regarding our actions in the upcoming days.

However, the apology was largely rejected as disingenuous by the skate community at large, serving only to draw more criticism for the Glasses and their brand. The Women's Flat Track Derby Association (WFTDA) removed Mota Skates as a vendor from all future events, stating "[w]e feel that our values are no longer aligned." During the initial social media backlash, several of Mota's sponsored skaters, including Violet Knockout of Gotham Girls Roller Derby, swiftly disassociated themselves from the brand, while skate shops across the globe vowed to discontinue sales of Mota products.

Taking again to social media, the Glasses authored another post, this time with no semblance of apologetic tone. A far cry from the prior month's voiced support for Black Lives Matter, the co-owner couple now claimed the Black Lives Matter movement was actually a "terrorist funded corrupt [sic], hateful & racist organization" that was "funded by Soros," while lambasting anyone who vocalized criticism of the brand as being racist themselves, writing in part:

NO one should ever tell others to shut up, listen and learn/obey. That alone is discrimination. Those yelling, preaching such discrimination are bigots in our opinion.

We will end it with our frustration and confusion why the BLM movement is not going to all large cities around the country using the millions they raise through donations to stop the killing our children and ALL Black Lives.. This will reduce the killing of black lives 20 folds over police brutality. Yes, We also support police reform. But seriously, what about the black kids getting killed? Unborn black kids at abortion clinics? This outrage against Mota and us personally has woken us like never before.
