= USA Roller Derby =

National roller derby team of the United States

- Nickname: USARD , Team USA
- Founded: 2011
- Colors
- President: Jackie Daniels
- Head coach: Kyle Adams, Chelsea "Smarty McFly" Stone, Tess "Baller Shot Caller" Harrison, and Vito Ramon
- Captain: Yeti or Not, Here I Come & Lauren Mutch
- Championships: 4; 2011 Roller Derby World Cup; 2014 Roller Derby World Cup; 2018 Roller Derby World Cup; 2025 Roller Derby World Cup
- Local media: Instagram: https://www.instagram.com/usarollerderby Facebook: https://www.facebook.com/usarollerderby/
- Main sponsor: Triple 8 & 187 Killer Pads
- Website: http://teamusarollerderby.com

USA Roller Derby represents the United States in international roller derby, in events such as the Roller Derby World Cup. The team's first international competition was the 2011 Roller Derby World Cup, where it finished in first place after defeating Team Canada in the final. Early on, it was known as "Team USA". A trademark challenge from the United States Olympic Committee led to the change to the name "USA Roller Derby" after the team's last international appearance.

The team remains undefeated in international play.

== Team roster ==
=== 2025 training squad ===
On October 1, 2024, the roster for the 2025 training squad was announced as follows: (skaters home league at time of announcement):

Name	League
Anne Swanson "Annie Swanson" (she/her)	Arch Rival Roller Derby
Evelyn Ozzie "Annyong" (she/her)	Rat City Roller Derby
Rachel Blackman "Blackman" (she/her)	Angel City Derby
Nicole Williams “Bonnie Thunders” (she/they)	Rose City Rollers
Sarah Arnosky Ko "Bricktator" (she her)	Arch Rival Roller Derby
Sara Putnam "Brickyard" (she her)	Greenville Roller Derby
Gretchen Frye "Coco Frye" (she/her)	Jacksonville Roller Derby
Darriann Hewson "Diamond" (she/her)	Race City Rebels / Circle City Roller Derby
Isabelle Eide "Dizzy Izzy" (she/her)	Jacksonville Roller Derby
Katie Calfee "Cloak N Dragher" (she/her)	Arch Rival Roller Derby
Tinisha Bonaby "Freight Train" (she/her)	Angel City Derby / Rockin' City Roller Derby
Rochelle Jubert "Gal of Fray" (she/her)	Rose City Rollers
Brooke Clark "Vicious Van Gogo"	Arch Rival Roller Derby
Jessica Sawicki "Hurtrude Stein" (she/her)	Minnesota Roller Derby
Megan Cortinas "Jackson" (she/her)	Sierra Regional Roller Derby
Takia Agresta "Jamsterella" (she/her)	Jacksonville Roller Derby
Cailin Klein "Klein" (she/her)	Denver Roller Derby
Kayla Woodward "K.Woo!!" (she/her)	Arch Rival Roller Derby
Shelby Castro "Lil RegulateHer" (she/her)	Rose City Rollers
Madalyn Weber "Madditude Adjustment" (she/her)	Grand Raggidy Roller Derby
Mia Palau "Mia Palau" (she/her)	Rose City Rollers
Loren Mutch "Mutch" (she/her)	Rose City Rollers
Kaitlynn Simpson "Psycho" (she/her)	Angel City Derby
Rachel Johnston "Rachel Rotten" (she/her)	Angel City Derby
Roxy Dallas "Roxy Dallas" (she/her)	Rose City Rollers
Hillary Buscovick "Scald Eagle" (she/her)	Denver Roller Derby
Shanna Simms "Shear-Ra Powers" (she/her)	Arch Rival Roller Derby
Anastasia Smith "Stan the Woman" (she/they)	Rose City Rollers
Tarandiehl Bahgat "Tarantula" (she/her)	Rose City Rollers
Tenacity Remington "Tenacity" (they/them)	Rose City Rollers
Aylin Woodward "Yeti or Not, Here I Come" (she/her)	Gotham Roller Derby

=== 2025 World Cup Charter ===
On March 25, 2025, the charter for the 2025 World Cup was announced as follows: (skaters home league at time of announcement):

Name	League
Anne Swanson "Annie Swanson" (she/her)	Arch Rival Roller Derby
Nicole Williams “Bonnie Thunders” (she/they)	Rose City Rollers
Sarah Arnosky Ko "Bricktator" (she her)	Arch Rival Roller Derby
Darriann Hewson "Diamond" (she/her)	Race City Rebels / Circle City Roller Derby
Isabelle Eide "Dizzy Izzy" (she/her)	Jacksonville Roller Derby
Katie Calfee "Cloak N Dragher" (she/her)	Arch Rival Roller Derby
Tinisha Bonaby "Freight Train" (she/her)	Angel City Derby / Rockin' City Roller Derby
Rochelle Jubert "Gal of Fray" (she/her)	Rose City Rollers
Brooke Clark "Vicious Van Gogo"	Arch Rival Roller Derby
Cailin Klein "Klein" (she/her)	Denver Roller Derby
Kayla Woodward "K.Woo!!" (she/her)	Arch Rival Roller Derby
Madalyn Weber "Madditude Adjustment" (she/her)	Grand Raggidy Roller Derby
Mia Palau "Mia Palau" (she/her)	Rose City Rollers
Loren Mutch "Mutch" (she/her)	Rose City Rollers
Hillary Buscovick "Scald Eagle" (she/her)	Denver Roller Derby
Shanna Simms "Shear-Ra Powers" (she/her)	Arch Rival Roller Derby
Anastasia Smith "Stan the Woman" (she/they)	Rose City Rollers
Tarandiehl Bahgat "Tarantula" (she/her)	Rose City Rollers
Tenacity Remington "Tenacity" (they/them)	Rose City Rollers
Aylin Woodward "Yeti or Not, Here I Come" (she/her)	Gotham Roller Derby

=== 2017 team roster ===
On October 5, 2016, the roster for the 2017 team was announced as follows: (skaters home league at time of announcement):

Logo used from 2014-2024

Name	League
Jennifer Adkins “Trauma”	Texas Rollergirls
Tracy Akers	Denver Roller Derby
Cassie Beck	Rat City Rollergirls
Rachel Bockheim “Jackie Daniels”	Texas Rollergirls
Hillary Buscovick “Scald Eagle”	Rose City Rollers
Jessica Chestnut	Rose City Rollers
Lauren Corry “Caf Fiend”	Gotham Girls Roller Derby
Roxy Dallas	Gotham Girls Roller Derby
Raquel Davila “Satan’s Little Helper”	Angel City Derby Girls
Aja Gair “Barbara Ambush”	Texas Rollergirls
Jennifer Gaskins “Snot Rocket Science”	Jacksonville RollerGirls
Tess Harrison “Baller Shot Caller”	Atlanta Rollergirls
Erin Jackson	Jacksonville RollerGirls
Nadia Kean “Smarty Pants”	Texas Rollergirls
Laci Knight	Angel City Derby Girls
Lynn Klas “Juke Boxx”	London Rollergirls
Sarah McKemie “Sexy Slaydie”	Gotham Girls Roller Derby
Loren Mutch	Rose City Rollers
Lacey Ramon “Carmen Getsome”	Rat City Rollergirls
Jes Rivas	Rose City Rollers
Jessica Rodriguez Peiffer “Licker N Split”	Rose City Rollers
Shaina Serelson	Victorian Roller Derby League
Vanessa Sites “V-Diva”	Gotham Girls Roller Derby
Jacqueline Thermitus “Blaque Jac”	Atlanta Rollergirls
Nicole Williams “Bonnie Thunders”	Gotham Girls Roller Derby

=== 2014 team roster ===
Logo used 2011-2014

On October 15, 2013, the roster for the 2014 World Cup team was announced by Derby News Network as follows (skater's home league at time of announcement listed):

Name	League
Julie Adams "Angela Death"	Denver Roller Dolls
Tracy Akers	Denver Roller Dolls
Laura Mann "Amanda Jamitinya"	B.ay A.rea D.erby Girls
Atomatrix	Arizona Roller Derby
Baller Shot Caller	Gold Coast Derby Girls
Bonnie Thunders	Gotham Girls Roller Derby
Carmen Getsome	Rat City Rollergirls
Donna Matrix	Gotham Girls Roller Derby
Fifi Nomenon	Texas Rollergirls
Fisti Cuffs	Gotham Girls Roller Derby
Jackie Daniels	Windy City Rollers
Juke Boxx	Minnesota RollerGirls
Mercy	Rose City Rollers
Mick Swagger	Gotham Girls Roller Derby
OMG WTF	Gotham Girls Roller Derby
Onda Sligh	Oly Rollers
Melanie Pfister	Wasatch Roller Derby
Polly Gone	Texas Rollergirls
Jes Rivas	Denver Roller Dolls
Scald Eagle	Rose City Rollers
Second Hand Smoke	Minnesota RollerGirls
Shaina Serelson	Denver Roller Dolls
Sexy Slaydie	Gotham Girls Roller Derby
Shenita Stretcher	Philly Roller Derby
Smarty Pants	Texas Rollergirls
Snot Rocket Science	Steel City Roller Derby
Suzy Hotrod	Gotham Girls Roller Derby
Teflon Donna	Philly Roller Derby
Trauma	Kansas City Roller Warriors
Urrk'n Jerk'n (as Booty Block Ya)	Denver Roller Dolls
VanEssa "V-Diva" Sites	Philly Roller Derby
Wild Cherri	Atlanta Rollergirls

=== 2011 team roster ===
After a series of tryout camps held throughout 2011 by tournament founder and sponsor Blood and Thunder Magazine, the U.S. team's roster was announced August 4 of that year as follows (home leagues of skaters at time of 2011 World Cup shown; * denotes alternate):

Name	League
Addy Rawl*	Queen City Roller Girls
Laura Mann "Amanda Jamitinya"	Rocky Mountain Rollergirls
Atomatrix	Oly Rollers
Bonnie Thunders	Gotham Girls Roller Derby
Claire D. Way	Boston Derby Dames
DeRanged	Rocky Mountain Rollergirls
Donna Matrix	Gotham Girls Roller Derby
Fisti Cuffs	Gotham Girls Roller Derby
Frida Beater	Rocky Mountain Rollergirls
Jamsterella*	Fort Myers Derby Girls
Joy Collision	Charm City Rollergirls
Juke Boxx	Minnesota RollerGirls
Heather Juska	Denver Roller Dolls
Little A	Tampa Bay Derby Darlins
Medusa	Minnesota RollerGirls
Psycho Babble	Rocky Mountain Rollergirls
Racer McChaseHer*	Detroit Derby Girls
Sassy	Oly Rollers
Sexy Slaydie	Gotham Girls Roller Derby
Shenita Stretcher	Philly Rollergirls
Smarty Pants	Texas Rollergirls
Snot Rocket Science	Steel City Derby Demons
Soulfearic Acid	Rose City Rollers
Suzy Hotrod	Gotham Girls Roller Derby
Tannibal Lector	Oly Rollers
Teflon Donna	Philly Rollergirls
Tracy Akers	Denver Roller Dolls
Urrk'n Jerk'n	Rocky Mountain Rollergirls
V-Diva	Dutchland Rollers
Varla Vendetta	Windy City Rollers
White Flight	Rose City Rollers
Wildberry Punch*	Mad Rollin' Dolls

=== 2024 staff ===
- Coaches: Kyle Adams, Chelsea "Smarty McFly" Stone, Tess "Baller Shot Caller" Harrison, and Vito Ramon
- Staff: Rachel "Rachel Rotten" Johnston, Jennifer "Ice Tease" Garnett, Michael Castellano, Morissey "Mo" Montgomery
- Board of Directors: Tess "Baller Shot Caller" Harrison, Nicole "Bonnie Thunders" Williams, Rachel "Jackie Daniels" Bockheim, Jes Rivas

=== 2016 staff ===
- Head coach: Drew Flowers
- Assistant coach: Tim Burns
- Team, Fundraising, and Merchandise Manager: Vivien Leigh-Em-Out

=== 2014 staff ===
- Head coach: Buster Cheatin'
- Assistant coach: Endless Justin
- Assistant coach: Joshua Pfenning
- Team, Fundraising, and Merchandise Manager: Vivien Leigh-Em-Out

=== 2012 staff ===
- Head coach: Buster Cheatin'
- Assistant coach: Endless Justin
- Team Manager: Rhino
- Team, Fundraising, and Merchandise Manager: Vivien Leigh-Em-Out

=== 2011 staff ===
- Head coach: Buster Cheatin'
- Assistant coach: Bonnie D.Stroir
- Team Manager: Rhino
- Team Manager: Endless Justin
- Fundraiser and Merchandise Manager: Vivien Leigh-Em-Out

The team's first practice was held in Denver, Colorado at the Rocky Mountain Rollergirls' War House on November 14, 2011, the Monday following the WFTDA National Championships. A limited number of VIP and general admission tickets were sold, however no press were admitted.

== 2011 Roller Derby World Cup ==
The team then known as "Team USA"'s first international action took place December 1 through 4, 2011, at the premiere Roller Derby World Cup, held in Toronto, Ontario, Canada. The U.S., one of 13 nations competing, began group play at the tournament in Group C, along with teams representing New Zealand and Scotland. The U.S. won both of its group bouts, defeating New Zealand 377 to 8 on the first day of the tournament, and Scotland on the second day, 435 to 1. On the night of the tournament's first day, the USA staged an exhibition bout, dividing its large roster into two teams nicknamed the Stars and the Stripes.

By virtue of the large point spread for the U.S. in their group bouts, the team was seeded first overall for the remainder of the tournament, and earned a bye past the first elimination round. In the quarter-finals, the U.S. faced New Zealand for the second time, winning this time by a score of 437 to 8. In the semi-final, the U.S. defeated Team Australia 532 to 4, in what was both the highest score and largest margin of victory for the entire tournament. In the final of the tournament, the U.S. defeated Team Canada 336 to 33. Joy Collision was voted MVP for the U.S. at the World Cup.
