= Auckland Roller Derby League =

Roller derby league

- Metro area: Auckland
- Country: New Zealand
- Founded: 2011
- Teams: Auckland Bolts (A team)
- Track type(s): Flat
- Venue: ActivZone Glenfield
- Affiliations: WFTDA
- Website: aucklandrollerderby.com

The Auckland Roller Derby League (ARDL) is a women's flat track roller derby league based in Auckland, New Zealand. Founded in 2011, the league is made up of a range of dedicated skaters, officials and volunteers. The bolts team wear blue and white with lightning-patterned pants. ARDL play teams from other leagues and across the globe, and is a member of the Women's Flat Track Derby Association (WFTDA).

== History ==
The league was founded in 2011 by a group of skaters from the Pirate City Rollers. They planned to reduce their use of derby names, and to wear more traditional sporting uniforms. Described by the Derby News Network as "some of the most experienced derby skaters in the Southern Hemisphere", they were soon joined by Anna "Wonton Destruction" Wong, the founder of Bristol Roller Derby in England.

Auckland competed in the 2012 Great Southern Slam, losing 202-66 to the Victorian Roller Derby League, but beating the Newcastle Roller Derby League 107-89. They did not progress to the semi-finals. In August, Auckland played at the first national tournament in New Zealand, beating Richter City in the semi-final, and the Swamp City Roller Rats in the final, to take the trophy.

In October 2012, Auckland was accepted as a member of the Women's Flat Track Derby Association Apprentice Programme. In January 2016, ARDL was accepted as WFTDA full members.

== WFTDA rankings ==
Season	Final ranking	Playoffs	Championship
2016	274 WFTDA	DNQ	DNQ
2017	191 WFTDA	DNQ	DNQ
2018	NR	DNQ	DNQ

- NR = no end-of-year ranking supplied
