= Hellmilton Roller Ghouls =

Roller derby league

- Metro area: Hamilton, New Zealand
- Founded: 2009
- Teams: Raggedy Angst (Travel Team); Gang'Green (Home Team); Ultra Violent (Home Team); Gremlins (Junior Team)
- Track type: Flat
- Venue: Melville Skate Rink
- Org. type: Non-profit

The Hellmilton Roller Ghouls are a roller derby league located in the central North Island of New Zealand.

Independently run by its members, the Hellmilton Roller Ghouls currently have one team, the Raggedy Angst.

== History ==
The Hellmilton Roller Ghouls were founded in 2009 when Fe Foster (known as Miss Metal Militia) returned home to Hamilton after traveling to Vancouver and becoming involved with the Terminal City Rollergirls.

The Roller Ghouls' first bout as the Raggedy Angst took place in New Plymouth in September 2010 where they claimed a victory.

The team's first home bout titled "Bout Bloody Time" was hosted in September 2011 at the Claudelands Arena and featured multiple teams: The newly-formed Dangerous Curves from the Mount Militia Derby Crew based in Tauranga, the Rumblebees of the Taranaki Roller Corps from New Plymouth, and the main event of Pirate City Rollers' Cannon Brawlers from Auckland taking on the Raggedy Angst.

=== International competition ===
In 2011, three skaters (Miss Metal Militia, Poison Petal, and Boom Shakalaka) from Hellmilton Roller Ghouls were selected to be part of Team New Zealand. Together they travelled to compete in the 2011 Roller Derby World Cup held in Toronto, Ontario, Canada. Team New Zealand placed 8th out of 13 teams.

In 2014, Hellmilton Roller Ghouls had two skaters selected to play in the Roller Derby World Cup in Dallas, Texas: Miss Metal Militia and Miss Crunchbull. Team New Zealand ranked 5th out of 30 teams worldwide.

== Raggedy Angst ==
Raggedy Angst is the Hellmilton Roller Ghouls' travel team. The team competes against other teams around New Zealand, traveling as well as hosting bouts.

Raggedy Angst's team colors are black and orange.

=== Season results ===
==== 2010 ====
Date	Opponent	Location	Final score	Winner
September 11, 2010	Taranaki Roller Corps	Taranaki	192-110	Raggedy Angst
November 21, 2010	Pirate City Prospects	Auckland	89-31	Raggedy Angst

==== 2011 ====
Date	Opponent	Location	Final score	Winner
August 6, 2011	NN Hell's Wives	Whangarei	176-60	Raggedy Angst
September 24, 2011	PCR Cannon Brawlers	Hamilton	??	PCR

==== 2012 ====
Date	Opponent	Location	Final score	Winner
May 26, 2012	Mount Militia	Mount Maunganui	190-132	MMDC
June 30, 2012	Dead End Derby All Stars	Christchurch	205-176	DED
August 11, 2012	Hell's Wives	Hamilton	166-102	Raggedy Angst
October 13, 2012	Richter City All Stars	Hamilton	180-118	RCRD
October 27, 2012	Pirate City Rollers	Auckland	295-61	PCR

==== 2013 ====
Date	Opponent	Location	Final score	Winner
July 6, 2013	Dead End Derby All Stars	Hamilton	200-131	DED
August 31, 2013	Swamp City Roller Rats	Palmerston North	246-69	SCRR
September 14, 2013	Bay City Rollers	Hamilton	197-114	Raggedy Angst

==== 2014 ====
Date	Opponent	Location	Final score	Winner
May 10, 2014	Taranaki Roller Corps	Hamilton	158-45	Raggedy Angst
May 10, 2014	Northland Nightmares	Hamilton	140-40	Raggedy Angst
June 28, 2014	Swamp City Roller Rats	Hamilton	133-110	SCRR
July 26, 2014	Bay City Rollers	Hamilton	150-127	Raggedy Angst
September 27, 2014	Fatal Derby Dolls	Hamilton	148-87	Raggedy Angst
October 11, 2014	Richter City Convicts	Wellington	257-128	RCRD

==== 2015 ====
Date	Opponent	Location	Final score	Winner
April 11, 2015	Bay City Rollers	Napier	240-111	BCR
July 18, 2015	Taranaki Roller Corps	New Plymouth	275-99	TRC
August 22, 2015	Sulphur City Steam Rollers	Hamilton	160-148	Raggedy Angst
September 5, 2015	WRDL Black Pearls	Hamilton	211-82	WRDL
September 19, 2015	NN Hell's Wives	Whangarei	146-113	NN

==== 2016 ====
Date	Opponent	Location	Final score	Winner
April 16, 2016	Sulphur City Steam Rollers	Hamilton	191–163	SCSR
July 24, 2016	BCR Twisted Sisters	Hamilton	145–116	BCR
August 6, 2016	SCRR Badda Bings	Levin	120–60	Raggedy Angst
August 6, 2016	Whenua Fatales	Levin	115–95	Raggedy Angst

=== Tournament results ===
==== National Tournament, 'Roller Derby Royal' hosted by Swamp City, October 26-27, 2013 ====
Opponent	Final score	Winner
Taranaki Roller Corps	152-49	Raggedy Angst
Pirate City Rollers	212-18	PCR
Dead End Derby	80-75	DED
Otautahi	178-81	Raggedy Angst
Mount Militia	97-59	MMDC
Whakatane Roller Derby League	126–16	Raggedy Angst

An overall placing of 11th (out of 16).

==== National Tournament, 'Roller Derby Royal' hosted by Swamp City, August 25, 2012 ====
Opponent	Final score	Winner
River City	157–4	Hellmilton
Mount Mititia	81–54	Hellmilton
Dead End Derby	125–75	Hellmilton
DD Gallow Lasses	112–104	DD

== Home season ==
The Hellmilton Roller Ghouls completed their first home season in 2012 with their two home teams Gang'Green (Black & Green) and Ultra Violent (Purple & Silver). These two home teams play against each other at Melville Skate Rink.

Season	Champion	Final score
2016	???	???
2013	GangGreen	159–14
2012	Ultra Violent	143–78

== Junior Monstar Squad ==
In July 2013 the Junior Monstar Squad was created, welcoming a younger generation of skaters. The Monstar Squad skaters are of all genders and range from 14 to 17 years old. They are split up into two groups; the Mogwais who are learning the skills and the Gremlins who are the official junior bouting team.

=== 2015 ===
Date	Opponent	Location	Final score	Winner
September 5, 2015	NN Hell Razors	Hamilton	325–214	Hell Razors
