= Swamp City Roller Derby =

Roller derby league

- Metro area: Palmerston North
- Country: New Zealand
- Founded: 2010
- Teams: All Stars (A team); The Honourable Māreikura (B team); Quad Bombers (Home team); Trauma Queens (Home team)
- Track type: Flat
- Venue: Arena Manawatu
- Affiliations: WFTDA
- Website: swampcityrollerderby.weeblysite.com

Swamp City Roller Derby (SCRD) is a women's flat track roller derby league, based in Palmerston North, New Zealand.

== History ==
The league was founded in March 2010 as the Swamp City Roller Rats by Trudy Hannon (Joanie Trash), Kyla Sinclair (Dutch Courage), and Mindy Foothead (9 Inch Diff). By May of the same year, the league had already attracted over 30 people to practices, and by January 2011, the league boasted 50 members.

The league began training in cramped conditions at Bell Hall until a new rink was opened at the Palmerston North Leisureplex in January 2011.

In July 2011, Swamp City played their first competitive bout against the Mountain City Rollers and Mount Militia Derby Crew in New Plymouth.

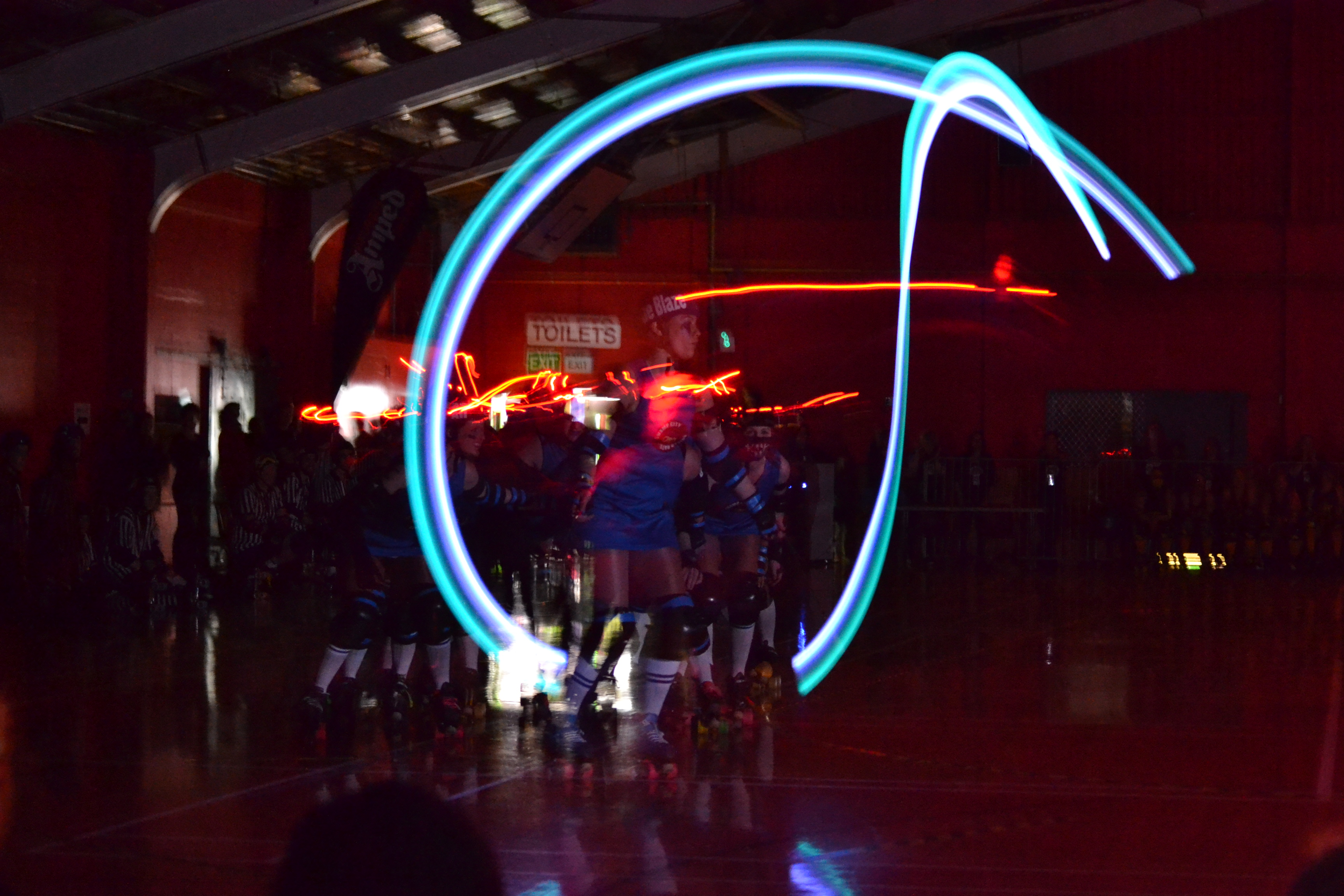
Swamp City Roller Rats make a dramatic entry to their first home bout - the triple-header billed as Grazed Anatomy.

In August of the same year they hosted their first home bout titled "Grazed Anatomy." The bout was a round robin triple-header against Taranaki Roller Corp's Rumble Bees and the Richter City Roller Derby Convicts (Richter's B team) from Wellington. Swamp City won against both teams, with the Rumble Bees taking victory in their bout against the Convicts.

In 2016, the league renamed their Facebook page and website from Swamp City Roller Rats to Swamp City Roller Derby.

Swamp City Roller Derby is committed to the Active Protection of Te Reo Māori me Ōna Tikanga by utilizing and celebrating the Māori language and customs in all areas of the league. In the league's words on their website, "We want to normalise Te Reo Māori and hold a safe space for nurturing and learning about kaupapa Māori."

=== Teams ===
Swamp City's A team was originally dubbed The Plague, but was The team was later renamed the All Stars.

The first Swamp City B team was called the Poison Ivies, but after a year-long hiatus, a new B team was launched in 2015 called the Badda Bings. In 2018 the league adopted the name 'Honourable Māreikura' for the B team, which means a female warrior, corresponding with the male warrior 'Whatukura'.

Swamp City developed two home teams for intraleague play. The Quad Bombers and the Trauma Queens go head-to-head at the league's annual "Quads n Queens" bout.

== Competition ==
In 2011, Swamp City skater Just Ass 4 All (Justine Saunders) was selected for the Team New Zealand training squad, but was not included in the final travel team.

August 2012 saw Swamp City host the country's first national tournament, dubbed Derby Royale, with 13 teams from all over New Zealand participating. Notably missing was the country's oldest league, Pirate City Rollers. Swamp City's A team, known at that time as The Plague, were runners-up in the competition, losing to Auckland Roller Derby League in the final.

The league hosted a second Derby Royale tournament in October 2013. The event was expanded from 13 to 16 teams, with competition now stretching over two full days. Swamp City team made the semi-finals, falling to eventual champions Pirate City Rollers.

In June 2015 the Swamp City All Stars played in their first international tournament, the Royal Rumble Derby Tournament in Gold Coast, Australia, hosted by Paradise City Roller Derby. Swamp City finished with a one-win, one-loss record. At the end of that year they were ranked 4th on Geex Quad's New Zealand Roller Derby Rankings table. The Badda Bings were ranked 18th.

In 2016 members of the league were instrumental in the organization of the New Zealand Derby Top 10 Champs competition. Swamp City's All Stars finished 3rd in their pool, qualifying for the Plate finals and finishing 7th overall. They also finished 7th on the rankings table. The Badda Bings were ranked 22nd.

Swamp City played their first WFTDA sanctioned bout on September 9th 2023 against Richter City Roller Derby and are part of the Oceania geographic region rankings.

=== WFTDA rankings ===
Season	Final ranking	Playoffs	Championship
2023	16 Oceania	DNQ	DNQ
2024	16 Oceania	DNQ	DNQ
