= Bonnie D.Stroir =

Personal information
- Birth name: Bonnie Beck
- Nationality: American
- Born: 1980
- Website: www.bonniedstroir.com

Sport
- Sport: Roller derby
- Club: Los Angeles Derby Dolls; San Diego Derby Dolls

Bonnie Beck (born 1980), known as Bonnie D.Stroir, is a roller derby coach and skater.

D.Stroir began skating in October 2003, after reading an article on the sport in Jane magazine. She had been working as a barber in Oceanside, California, considered moving to Austin, Texas, to learn the sport from TXRD Lonestar Rollergirls. Instead, she stayed in San Diego and joined the new Los Angeles Derby Dolls league, commuting to each practice.

In 2005, D.Stroir formed the San Diego Derby Dolls in her hometown, attracting the initial batch of skaters through an advertisement on Craigslist. The new squad was established as a sister league of the LA team, and D.Stroir became the new league's coach.

Knowing that she would be moving to Eureka, California, in 2010, D.Stroir posted a Craigslist ad reaching out for someone to help her form a league. The founder of Humboldt Roller Derby, Jennifer McMahon, contacted her and later went on to form Humboldt Roller Derby in 2007.

Early in 2011, D.Stroir took time off from competitive roller derby to become the world's first full-time roller derby coach. She traveled the world to coach a wide variety of teams, and was appointed as Assistant Coach of Team USA at the 2011 Roller Derby World Cup.

Citing her love of the game, she returned to practice in 2012, skated with the San Diego Derby Dolls in 2013, and retired for a second time in September 2013.
