= Northland Roller Derby =

Roller derby league

- Metro area: Whangārei
- Country: New Zealand
- Founded: 2010
- Teams: Hell's Wives (A team); Death Row Dolls; Diva Destruction; Derby Bratz
- Track type: Flat
- Venue: Portland Hall (training); Kensington Stadium (bouts)

Northland Roller Derby is a flat-track roller derby league based in Whangārei, New Zealand.

== History ==
Northland Roller Derby was founded as the Northland Nightmares Roller Girlz in 2010.

Northland Nightmares Roller Girlz logo

The league's first team, Hell's Wives, were also established in 2010. Hell's Wives competed in Auckland competition until the league grew popular enough to hold its own internal competitions.

In 2011, intraleague teams Death Row Dolls and Diva Destruction were formed. Hell's Wives continues as the league's traveling representative team. The junior Derby Bratz team was also formed in 2011.

== Venues ==
The league originally trained at church-owned Kamo Recreation Centre. The church moved the league on from there at the beginning of 2011, citing increasing student numbers at the church school, which used the hall as a gym, and falling outside use. The league then struggled to find a suitable place to train.

The league's 2011 season was eventually spent training at Portland Hall and bouting at Kensington Stadium.

== Notable Achievements ==
In 2011 two members of the Northland Nightmares, Jo "Axl-Slash-R" McQueen and Cara "Solid Sarge" Norman were selected to play for Roller Derby Team New Zealand in the inaugural Roller Derby World Cup. The New Zealand team placed 8th out of 13 teams.
