= Charata =

- City
- Location of Charata in Argentina
- Coordinates: 27°13′S 61°12′W
- Country: Argentina
- Province: Chaco
- Department: Chacabuco
- Founded: 1914
- Elevation: 85 m (279 ft)

Population (2010 census)
  - Total: 26,497
- Time zone: UTC−3 (ART)
- CPA base: H3730
- Dialing code: +54 3731
- Climate: Cfa
- Website: Official website

Charata is a city in the province of Chaco, Argentina. It has 26497 inhabitants as per the 2010 census [INDEC], and is the head town of the Chacabuco Department and the most important city in the southwest of Chaco, located 280 km from the provincial capital Resistencia.

== History ==
The city was founded by provincial decree on 4 October 1914.

Charata is the important settlement closest to the Campo del Cielo crater meteoric dispersion (originated by the impact of a large metallic meteoroid, probably around 3800 BCE).
