= Fort Myers Roller Derby =

Roller derby league

- Metro area: Fort Myers, FL
- Country: United States
- Founded: 2007
- Teams: Palm City Punishers (A team); Fort Myers Misdemeanors (B team)
- Track type: Flat
- Venue: Fort Myers Skatium
- Affiliations: WFTDA
- Website: www.fortmyersrollerderby.com

Fort Myers Roller Derby (FMRD ) is a women's flat track roller derby league based in Fort Myers, Florida. Founded in 2007, the league consists of two teams, which compete against teams from other leagues. Fort Myers is a member of the Women's Flat Track Derby Association (WFTDA).

== History ==
By 2009, the league had more than thirty skaters, and was competing on a monthly basis. In 2013, the league was attracting 300 to 400 fans to each bout, and its B team was particularly successful, winning more than ten bouts in a row.

Jamsterella, a skater from the league, was selected as an alternate for Team USA at the 2011 Roller Derby World Cup.

The league was accepted as a member of the Women's Flat Track Derby Association Apprentice Program in July 2012, and became a full member of the WFTDA in June 2013.

== WFTDA rankings ==
Season	Final ranking	Playoffs	Championship
2013	42 WFTDA	DNQ	DNQ
2014	80 WFTDA	DNQ	DNQ
2015	81 WFTDA	DNQ	DNQ
2016	118 WFTDA	DNQ	DNQ
2017	193 WFTDA	DNQ	DNQ
2018	191 WFTDA	DNQ	DNQ
