= Parque Chacabuco =

Neighborhood of Buenos Aires, Argentina

Coordinates: 34°38′S 58°27′W

- Neighborhood of Buenos Aires
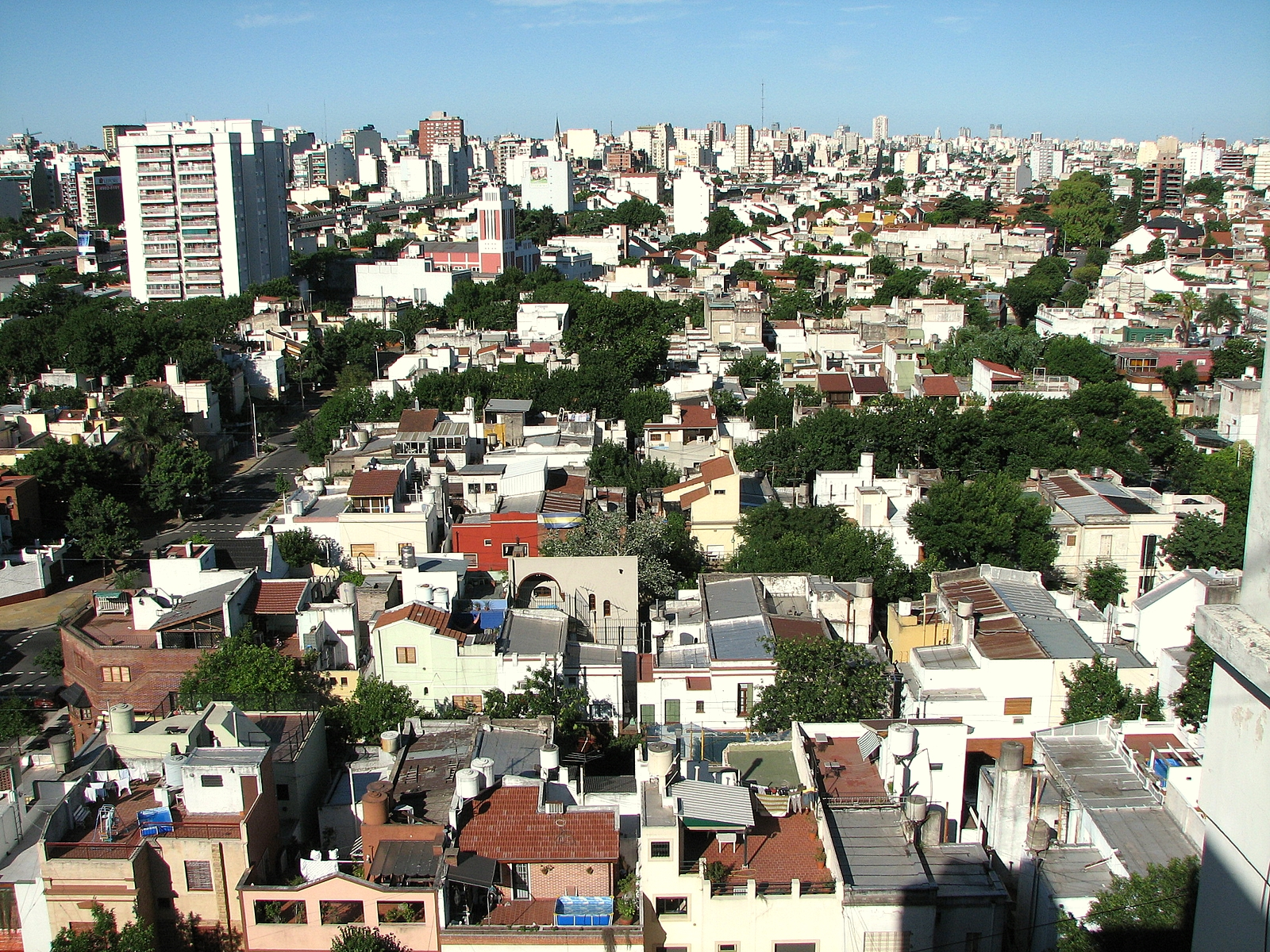
- View of the district

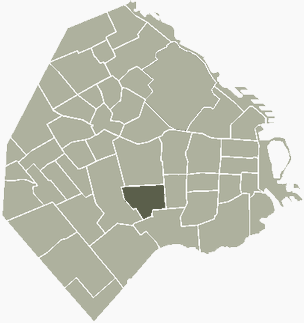
- Location of Parque Chacabuco within Buenos Aires
- Country: Argentina
- Autonomous City: Buenos Aires
- Comuna: C7
- Important sites: Chacabuco Park

Area
  - Total: 2.4 km^{2} (0.93 sq mi)

Population
  - Total: 39,473
  - Density: 16,000/km^{2} (43,000/sq mi)
- Time zone: UTC-3 (ART)

Parque Chacabuco is a neighbourhood in Buenos Aires, Argentina. Its name is due to Chacabuco Park, which is in its centre, taking the name from the Battle of Chacabuco.

== Geography ==
It is located in the centre-south of Buenos Aires. It limits to the north with Caballito through Directorio Avenue, to the west with Flores through Carabobo Av, Curapaligüe Av and Camilo Torres St, to the south with Nueva Pompeya through Riestra Av. and Cobo Av, and to the east with Boedo through La Plata Avenue.

Day of the neighbourhood: May 15

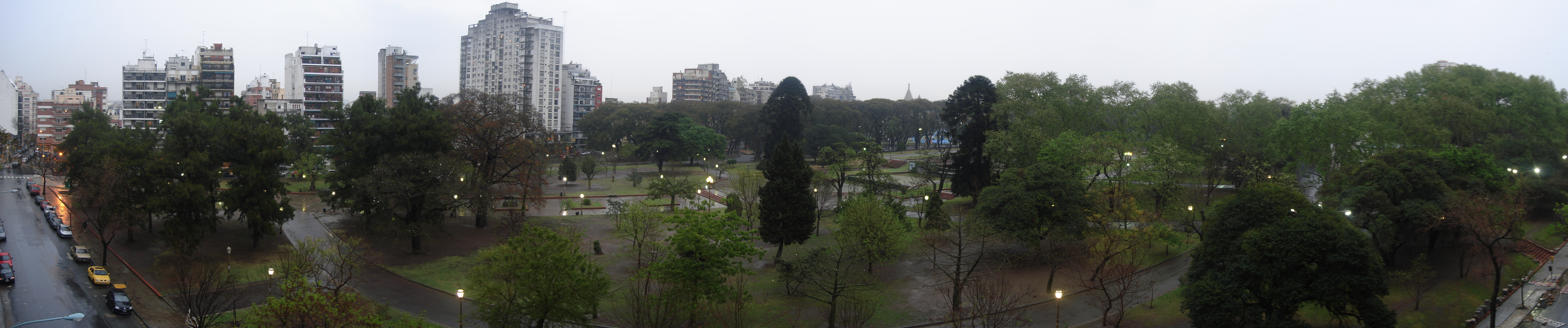
Panoramic view of Chacabuco Park, the barrio's namesake and one of the largest in Buenos Aires.
