= Chilean ship Chacabuco =

Several ships of the Chilean Navy have been named Chacabuco after the Battle of Chacabuco:

- Chilean corvette Chacabuco (1818), a corvette launched in 1815 as the Avon in the United States she was purchased by Chilean privateers in 1818 and renamed Coquimbo but was acquired by the Chilean government and renamed Chacabuco. She was sold to Argentina in 1826.
- Chilean corvette Chacabuco (1866), a corvette launched in 1866 and scrapped in 1890.
- Chilean cruiser Chacabuco (1898), a cruiser constructed as a private venture by her builders she was launched in 1898 under the name Fourth of July before being acquired by Chile in 1902 and renamed. She was struck in 1959.
- Chilean cruiser Chacabuco (1982), a cruiser launched in 1937 as USS Nashville she was acquired by Chile in 1951 and renamed Capitán Prat. In 1982 she was renamed Chacabuco and was scrapped in 1985
- Chilean landing ship Chacabuco (LST-95), a BATRAL-class landing ship commissioned in 1986
