= Circle City Roller Derby =

Roller derby league in Indiana, U.S.

- Metro area: Indianapolis, IN
- Country: United States
- Founded: 2008
- Teams: Socialites (A team); Party Crashers (B team)
- Track type(s): Flat
- Venue: Perry Park
- Affiliations: WFTDA
- Website: www.circlecityderbygirls.com

Circle City Roller Derby (CCRD), formerly the Circle City Roller Girls, is a women's flat track roller derby league based in Indianapolis, Indiana. Founded in 2008, the league currently consists of two teams which compete against teams from other leagues. Circle City is a member of the Women's Flat Track Derby Association (WFTDA).

== History ==
The league initially bouted at the Ellenberger Park Ice Rink, but this closed, and they moved to The Forum at Fishers. In 2016, during their eighth season, they moved to bout at Perry Park, in Indianapolis, on the southside of the park. The league has close links with Men's Roller Derby Association league, the Race City Rebels, and the Indianapolis Junior Derby team.

Circle City was accepted into the Women's Flat Track Derby Association Apprentice Program in April 2011, and became a full member of the WFTDA in June 2012.

On December 15, 2020, the league announced via their Facebook page that they would be changing their name to Circle City Roller Derby, writing that the “rebranding reflects our commitment to inclusivity, welcoming all athletes into our community.” Currently the team is working to update their social media platforms, merchandise, and possibly their logo as well.

== WFTDA rankings ==
Season	Final ranking	Playoffs	Championship
2013	135 WFTDA	DNQ	DNQ
2014	164 WFTDA	DNQ	DNQ
2015	240 WFTDA	DNQ	DNQ
2016	219 WFTDA	DNQ	DNQ
2017	197 WFTDA	DNQ	DNQ
2018	237 WFTDA	DNQ	DNQ
2019	220 WFTDA	DNQ	DNQ
2020	213 WFTDA	DNQ	DNQ
