= Two Bit Circus =

American amusement park

- Interactive map of Two Bit Circus
- Location: 634 Mateo St; Los Angeles, California, U.S.
- Coordinates: 34.0375°N 118.2315°W
- Status: Operating
- Theme: Traveling carnival
- Operating season: Year-round
- Website: Two Bit Circus

Two Bit Circus is an American amusement park and themed entertainment company, marketing itself as the world's first "micro amusement park" for its smaller scale indoor attractions. Located in the Arts District of Downtown Los Angeles, Two Bit Circus opened a second location in Dallas, Texas, in 2022.

Compared to Chuck E. Cheese and noted for its usage of virtual reality, Two Bit Circus received positive reviews from critics and audiences upon its opening. The two parks largely succeeded by innovating upon the history of the American traveling carnival, with inventions like the fire performance dunk tank Flambé coming from the entertainment company prior to expansion into creating their own amusement parks.
