= San Diego Derby United =

American roller derby organization

- Metro area: San Diego, California
- Country: United States
- Founded: 2005
- Teams: Wildfires (RDCL-A); Sparks (RDCL-B); San Diego Aftershocks (MRDA); CalSquad Roller Derby (Open Gender); Spitfires (JR RDCL-A); Firecrackers (JR RDCL-12U); Tremors (JRDA-A); Mini-Tremors (JRDA-12U); Stripes (Officials); SISTER PROGRAM - SoCal Derby Kraken (WFTDA-A); SISTER PROGRAM - SoCal Derby Cuttlefish (WFTDA-B); SISTER PROGRAM - SoCal Derby Tentakills (WFTDA-C)
- Track type(s): Banked, Flat
- Venue: Derby United HQ
- Affiliations: RDCL, WFTDA
- Website: derbyunited.com

San Diego Derby United is a roller derby organization based in San Diego, California. Its two-acre facility in the Encanto neighborhood features both banked and flat regulation roller derby tracks.

In 2005, Bonnie D.Stroir founded the program, then named the San Diego Derby Dolls, in a Linda Vista roller rink, Skateworld. The early years of the program were spent learning the sport and fundraising for the program's first banked track.

== History ==
The league was founded by Bonnie D.Stroir, who lived in San Diego, but had been skating with LA Derby Dolls for two years.

Around late 2006, the San Diego Derby Dolls installed a banked track in Encanto, but also continue to compete on a flat track, becoming the first "hybrid" league.

By 2009, the Dolls had about 80 skaters and nearly 1,000 fans. San Diego won the 2009 and 2010 editions of Battle on the Bank, the national banked track roller derby championship and came in 3rd place in the 2011 Battle on the Bank. In 2010, they were ranked 20th in the world in flat-track derby. In March 2011, they took on WFTDA Championship winners the Rocky Mountain Rollergirls on the Dolls' banked track, losing 100-125 to the flat track league.

San Diego was a founding member of the Roller Derby Coalition of Leagues in January 2012.

In December 2015, the San Diego Derby Dolls announced they had teamed up with local WFTDA roller derby league SoCal Derby to make the first coalition between a banked and flat track league under one roof in modern roller derby. In 2018, the program went on to expand their offerings, bringing in the San Diego Aftershocks from the Men's Roller Derby Association. In 2019, they brought in the San Diego Tremors from the Junior Roller Derby Association.

== In media and culture ==
The San Diego Derby Dolls were the inspiration for the 2013 play Derbywise by Circle Circle dot dot.

In 2015, the San Diego Derby Dolls and General Manager, Isabelle Ringer, were highlighted on Mike Rowe's CNN Program 'Somebody's Gotta Do It' in episode entitled 'Derby Dolls.'

Preceded by Los Angeles Derby Dolls	Battle on the Bank winners 2009–2010	Succeeded by Team Legit
