= Chacabuco Park =

Park in Buenos Aires, Argentina

Coordinates: 34°38′04″S 58°26′36″W

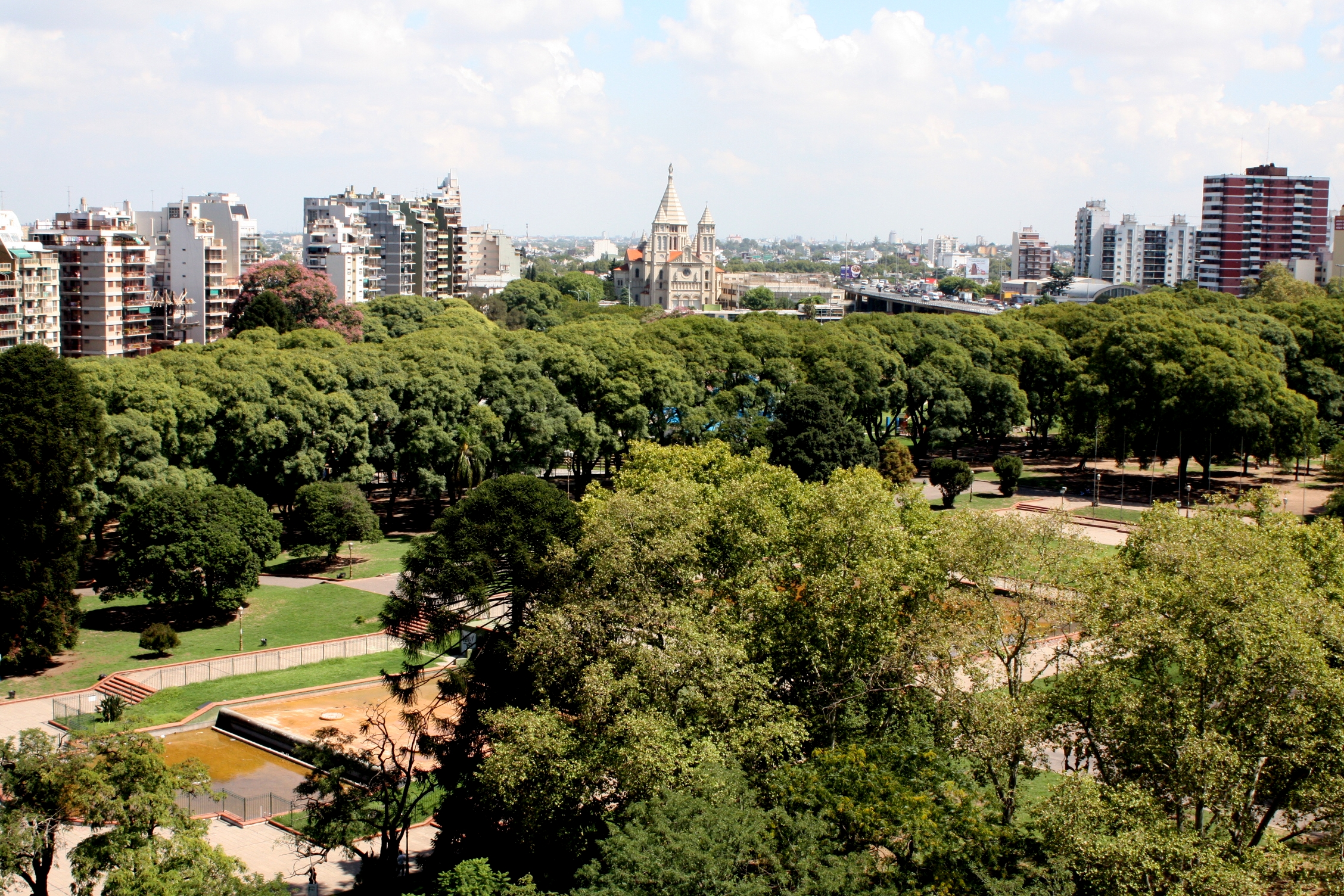
Panoramic view. The Church of the Miraculous Medal is visible at a distance.

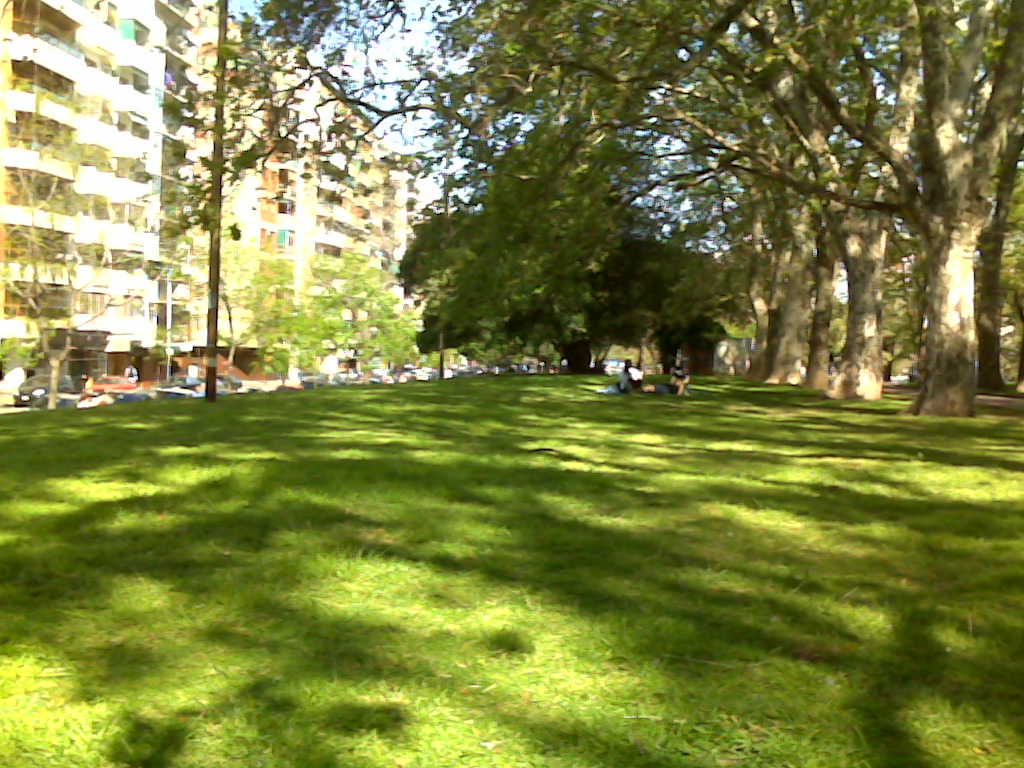
Picnic goers at the park in the springtime

Chacabuco Park is a public park in the Parque Chacabuco section of Buenos Aires.

== Overview ==
Situated over 3 mi (5 km) west of colonial Buenos Aires, land belonging to Jesuits was expropriated following their 1767 Papal suppression. The extensive plot was sold to a gunpowder maker in 1781, remaining in that use until the municipality purchased it in 1898. A May 15, 1903, city ordinance provided for the demolition of what had become a gunpowder dump, and outlined a future, 20 hectare (50 acre) park at the site. The facility itself was planned by the City Parks Commissioner, the noted French Argentine urbanist Charles Thays, and was opened in 1909. Named in honor of the pivotal 1817 Battle of Chacabuco, it originally featured ornate entry gates, three football fields, as well as selected business installations, such as a dairy, bookstore and tree nursery.

A number of athletic grounds were installed at the park in 1911, including a running track, tennis courts, swimming pools, and a bocce court. A school for special education was installed around 1920 and is still operated there, as are two primary schools and a physical education facility. One of the special education school's noted instructors was the ill-fated poet, Alfonsina Storni.

The park became well known for its floral variety and selection of decorative sculptures, as well. A rose garden featuring over 3,000 varietals was maintained alongside the nursery, and after 1930, numerous memorial and naturalist sculptures were installed, including monuments to José de San Martín, Domingo Sarmiento and Frédéric Chopin, as well as naturalist works evoking the ceremonial Inca maidens (the Ñusta), a jaguar, and others. The park was further complemented by the 1941 opening of the Church of Our Lady of the Miraculous Medal.

The planned construction of a network of intra-city freeways by the last dictatorship's Mayor, Osvaldo Cacciatore, led to the 1978 destruction of a wide, diagonal swath through the park. The damage to the park (the area's principal green space) was only partially remedied by the 1981 opening of a sports complex and the 1984 construction of a cultural center under the freeway, itself. Works initiated in January 2008 on new freeway on-ramps and off-ramps met with steadfast opposition from neighborhood groups, and their construction was suspended pending review.
