= Los Angeles Derby Dolls =

Roller derby league

- Metro area: Los Angeles
- Country: United States
- Founded: 2003
- Teams: Derby Dolls X (travel team); Fight Crew; Scream Queens; Tough Cookies; Varsity Brawlers; Junior Fight Crew; Junior Scream Queens; Junior Tough Cookies
- Track type(s): Banked
- Affiliations: RDCL, WFTDA
- Website: derbydolls.com

The L. A. Derby Dolls (LADD) is Los Angeles' original women's quad-skate banked track roller derby league. It was founded in October 2003 by Rebecca Ninburg (a.k.a. Demolicious) and Wendy Templeton (a.k.a. Thora Zeen). The league is composed of more than 150 women divided into five teams who skate on a banked track.

Like most modern roller derby leagues, the L.A. Derby Dolls is a do-it-yourself and 100% skater-run organization. The league operates entirely on volunteer work; there are no paid athletes. The L.A. Derby Dolls are one of only thirteen banked track leagues in the United States. The founders' vision for the league includes legitimizing the sport of roller derby and promoting businesses and organizations run by women.

In January 2012, the L.A. Derby Dolls were a founding member of the Roller Derby Coalition of Leagues.

In February 2018, Los Angeles Derby Dolls was accepted as an apprentice member of the Women's Flat Track Derby Association (WFTDA).

== Teams ==
There are five teams within the Los Angeles Derby Dolls league. The four home teams are: the Fight Crew, the Scream Queens, the Tough Cookies and the Varsity Brawlers. The fifth team is the Derby Dolls X, which are the L.A. Derby Doll's all-star team that competes on a national level.

The three junior teams are: Junior Fight Crew, Junior Scream Queens, and Junior Tough Cookies.

The L.A. Derby Dolls also have their own referee team called "The Enforcers".

== Community service ==
The L.A. Derby Dolls have partnered with other organizations for community service work such as the Human Rights Campaign, Children of the Night, Big Sunday, AIDS Project Los Angeles (APLA), Children's Hospital Los Angeles, the St. Vincent Medical Center (Los Angeles), the American Diabetes Association (ADA), and with After-School All-Stars (ASAS) to help teach young girls the sport of roller derby.

Because of their community service outreach programs, in 2009, the L.A. Derby Dolls were honored as a Treasure of Los Angeles by the Central City Organization, putting them in a category with the likes of Magic Johnson and the LA Dodgers.

The LA Derby Dolls have also been hosting the Down Syndrome Association of Los Angeles (DSALA) critically acclaimed annual fundraising event called TwentyWonder — “A Carnival Of The Mind” since 2011. All proceeds benefit individuals born with Trisomy 21 (Down syndrome) living in the greater Los Angeles area.

== Training ==
LADD also has a junior league for girls ages 7–17 to learn the sport of roller derby and to learn empowerment, community, leadership, and athleticism.

The Derby Dolls offer a roller derby fitness program called Derby Por Vida (DPV) for the public to learn how to play roller derby. This program is open to both men and women.

DPV is also considered a stepping stone into the LA Derby Dolls Fresh Meat program where women train to become team skaters for the league.

Co-ed scrimmages are offered during wRECk League. All types of scrimmage-safe skaters from freshmeat to retired as well as referees can enjoy either flat or banked track game play during wRECk League practice.

Every March, LADD brings in top roller derby trainers (both flat and banked track) to teach at their camp called March RADness which has limited space.

LADD attracts skaters from around the world who wish to learn on a banked track.

== Media ==
The Derby Dolls have been featured on NBC's Kath and Kim, VH1's "Rock of Love," Chelsea Lately, CNN, FOX News and several LADD skaters appear in Whip It!, which was written by former L.A. Derby Dolls (and original Sirens) skater Shauna “Maggie Mayhem” Cross. They were also featured on episodes of CSI Miami, Bones and Bunheads.

== Skaters ==
In addition to Shauna Cross, notable Derby Dolls skaters include screenwriter and author Pamela Ribon, journalist and author Alex Cohen, actresses Emma Dumont and Ivy Wolk, and roller derby coach Bonnie D.Stroir. Comedian Blaine Capatch has been an announcer for the league.

== Sister League ==
The Los Angeles Derby Dolls also has a sister league located in San Diego, California called the San Diego Derby Dolls (SDDD).

Preceded by New tournament	Battle on the Bank winners 2008	Succeeded by San Diego Derby Dolls
Preceded by Team Legit	Battle on the Bank winners 2012–2015	Succeeded by Current champions
