= Chacabuco Department, Chaco =

Chacabuco Department
- Department
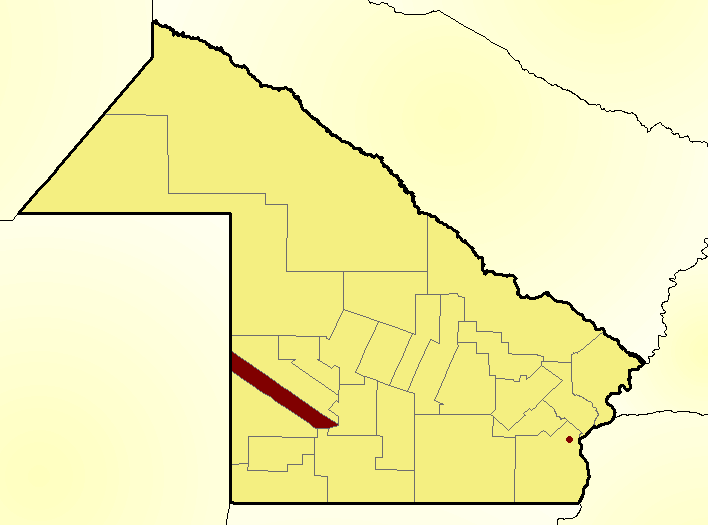
- Location of Bermejo Department within Chaco Province
- Coordinates: 27°13′S 61°12′W
- Country: Argentina
- Province: Chaco Province
- Head town: Charata

Area
  - Total: 1,378 km^{2} (532 sq mi)

Population
  - Total: 27,813
  - Density: 20.18/km^{2} (52.28/sq mi)
- Demonym: charatense
- Time zone: UTC-3 (ART)
- Postal code: H3730
- Area code: 03731

Chacabuco Department is a western department of Chaco Province in Argentina.

The provincial subdivision has a population of about 28,000 inhabitants in an area of 1,378 km^{2} (532 sq mi), and its capital city is Charata, which is located around 1,100 km (680 mi) from the Capital federal.
