= Pirate City Rollers =

Roller derby league

- Metro area: Auckland
- Country: New Zealand
- Founded: 2006
- Dissolved: 2025
- Teams: All Scars (A team); Broadside Brawlers (B team); Dead Wreckoning; Mascara Massacre; Blackheart Bruisers
- Track type(s): Flat
- Venue: Trusts Stadium
- Affiliations: WFTDA
- Org. type: Incorporated Society
- Website: piratecityrollers.com

Pirate City Rollers was a women's flat track roller derby league based in Auckland. Founded in 2006, the league was a member of the Women's Flat Track Derby Association (WFTDA).

== History and organization ==
Pirate City was founded by Black Dahlia, who had previously played roller derby in the United States. They formed in 2006, and claim to be the oldest roller derby league outside North America. In 2007, the Pirates played their first home season, and they bouted against Richter City Roller Derby in 2009, in New Zealand's first interleague bout, winning 174-88 in front of a crowd of 1,200 people.

In October 2011, Pirate City became an apprentice member of the Women's Flat Track Derby Association, the first WFTDA Apprentice league in New Zealand. It graduated to full membership of the WFTDA in September 2013, the same year they were crowned the champions of the Derby Royale national tournament.

Pirate City Rollers featured three home teams, the Blackheart Bruisers, Dead Wreckoning and the Mascara Massacre. Pirate City's travel teams were the B team Broadside Brawlers, and the A team All Scars, who were formed in 2009.

In May 2025, Pirate City Rollers merged with Auckland Roller Derby to form Volcanic City Rollers, as posted to Pirate City and Auckland's respective Instagram pages.

== WFTDA competition ==
Pirate City first qualified for WFTDA Playoffs in 2017, as the tenth seed at the Division 2 Playoffs and Championships in Pittsburgh, United States. A narrow opening loss to Boston Roller Derby was followed by a 275-253 overtime loss to Bear City Roller Derby, ending Pirate City's weekend.

Pirate City later qualified for the WFTDA Regional Champs in 2024, hosted by Adelaide Roller Derby in Wayville, South Australia. Pirate City entered at the sixth seed and won their first game against eleventh-seed Canberra Roller Derby League's Vice City Rollers but lost the second against Adelaide who sat at third seed. Their consolation game was against Sun State Roller Derby.

=== WFTDA rankings ===
Season	Final ranking	Playoffs	Championship
2015	98 WFTDA	DNQ	DNQ
2016	97 WFTDA	DNQ	DNQ
2017	54 WFTDA	N/A	CR D2
2018	70 WFTDA	DNQ	DNQ
2019	79 WFTDA	DNQ	DNQ
2023	15 Oceania	NPS	NPS
2024	8 Oceania	CR	DNQ

- CR = consolation round
- no rankings 2020-2022 due to COVID-19 pandemic
- NPS = no postseason due to COVID-19 pandemic

== International ==
Pirate City Rollers were the only league from New Zealand to field a team at the Great Southern Slam, the Asia-Pacific region's first roller derby tournament, held in June 2010. They easily beat Sydney and Western Australia in the pool matches, and Perth in the quarter-final, before succumbing to Victorian in the semi-final, and narrowly losing to hosts Adelaide in the third-place play-off.

The Pirates travel Team 'All Scars' played at Beach Brawl 2015, hosted by Gold Coast Derby Grrls and held in Ft Lauderdale, Florida, USA, 12–14 June, where they aimed to be the first WTFDA internationally ranked team in New Zealand. From their performance at this tournament they debuted at number 87 in the WFTDA 30 June 2015 rankings, 69 places above the other New Zealand team Richter City Roller Derby which also debuted in these rankings.

Numerous members of Pirate City have represented Team New Zealand at the Roller Derby World Cup. The 2011 Roller Derby World Cup was hosted by Toronto Roller Derby, 1–4 December 2011 at The Bunker at Downsview Park in Toronto, Canada. Seven Pirate City skaters were selected to play for Team New Zealand that year, with the coach and assistant coach also coming from the league. Team New Zealand finished 8th out of 13 countries competing. Pirate City Rollers skater Skate The Muss was awarded MVP for Team New Zealand. All four of the Pirate City Rollers skaters selected for the 2014 Team New Zealand training squad also made the final 20 selection to play the 2014 Roller Derby World Cup, held 4–7 December at Kay Bailey Hutchison Convention Center in Dallas, United States. Team New Zealand finished 5th out of 30 countries competing.
