= Derby News Network =

Former internet broadcast network

Derby News Network (DNN), based in Baltimore, was an internet broadcast network, founded in 2007, which featured the women's skating sport of roller derby. DNN used the internet to collect remote streaming video, photographs, audio, and text from reporters around the world, and distribute it internationally. DNN was frequently cited as an authoritative source on roller derby by other news agencies.

On September 9, 2014, the site's staff announced that it would cease operations and was officially 'retired', although the site remains online and its pages archived.
