= Roller Derby World Cup =

Roller derby tournament

- 2011–present

Tournament information
- Sport: Roller derby
- Location: Varies
- Month played: December to February
- Established: 2011
- Number of tournaments: 4
- Format: Ranking matches and knockout
- Teams: 38
- Website: rollerderbyworldcup.com

Current champion
- United States

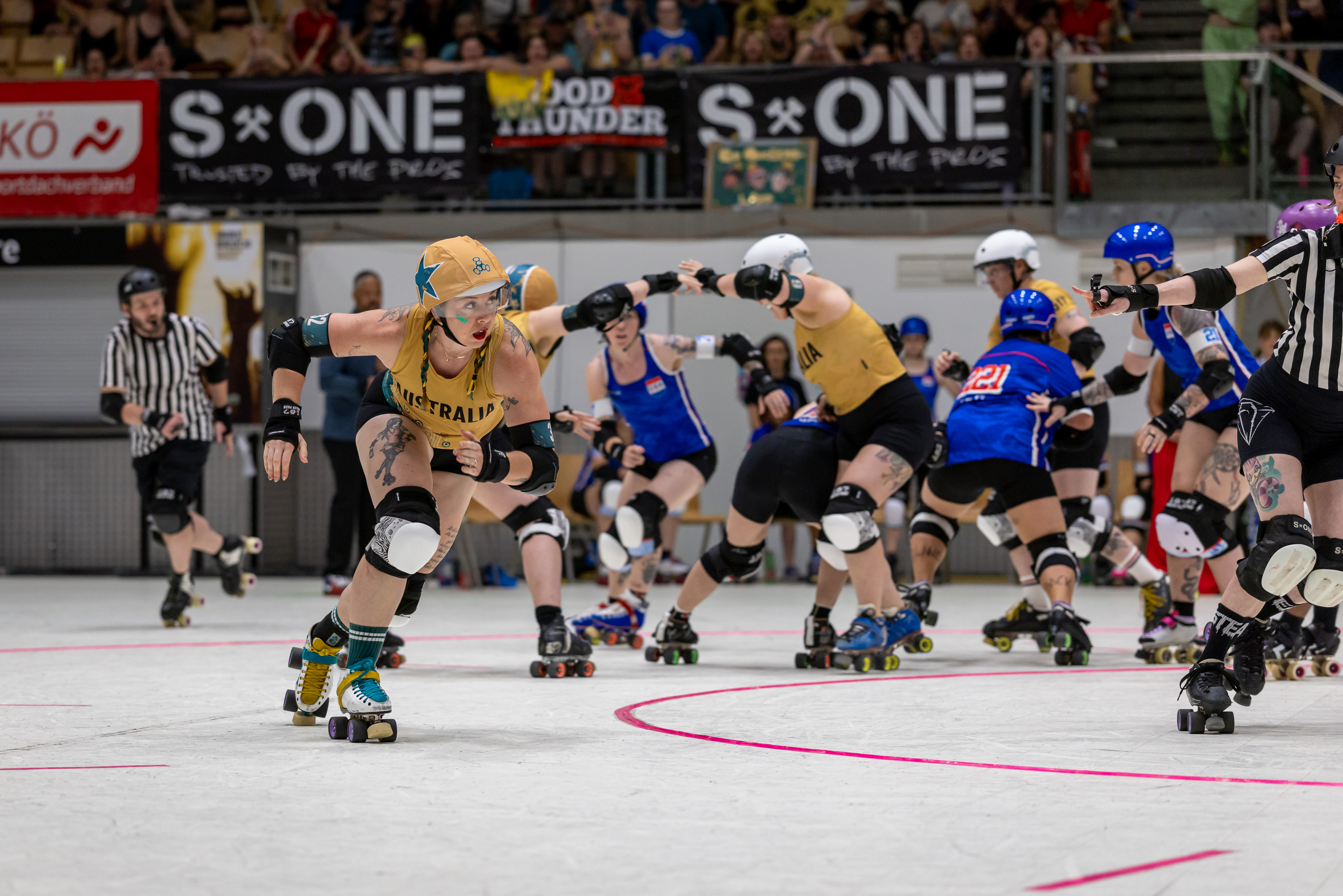
Final of the Roller Derby World Cup 2025 (USA Roller Derby versus Team Australia Roller Derby)

The Roller Derby World Cup is an international women's roller derby tournament formerly organized by Blood & Thunder magazine, and currently organized by the Roller Derby World Cup Committee. Teams of amateur skaters from around the world compete for their respective nations. The most recent Roller Derby World Cup was held in 2025 in Innsbruck, Austria.

== History ==
The inaugural 2011 Roller Derby World Cup was hosted by Toronto Roller Derby, and was held December 1 through 4, 2011, at The Bunker at Downsview Park in Toronto, Ontario, Canada. It was won by Team USA, who beat Team Canada by a score of 336 points to 33 in the final. Live online coverage of the event was broadcast on the Derby News Network.

The 2014 Roller Derby World Cup took place December 4 through 7, 2014, in Dallas, Texas. Team USA repeated their victory, this time defeating Team England in the final 219–105. For the 2014 event, the complete live online coverage was broadcast by Blood and Thunder magazine, through the official Roller Derby World Cup website.

The 2018 Roller Derby World Cup was held in early February 2018, hosted by Rainy City Roller Derby, in Greater Manchester, England. On this occasion, USA Roller Derby defeated Team Australia (roller derby) in the final.

The 2025 Roller Derby World Cup is hosted by Fearless Bruisers Roller Derby, of Innsbruck, Austria and will be welcoming skaters from around the World to the Olympiaworld Sports Complex from 3 to 6 July 2025, for what will be the largest World Cup to date, with 48 teams participating in 80 matches.

== Results ==
Year	Host	Winners	Score	Runners-up	Third Place	Score	Fourth Place	Teams
2011	Toronto	United States	336–33	Canada	England	203–85	Australia	13
2014	Dallas	United States	219–105	England	Australia	197–128	Canada	30
2018	Manchester	United States	187–146	Australia	Canada	173–147	England	38
2025	Innsbruck	United States	208–55	Australia	England	149–84	France	48
