= Roller derby in Australia =

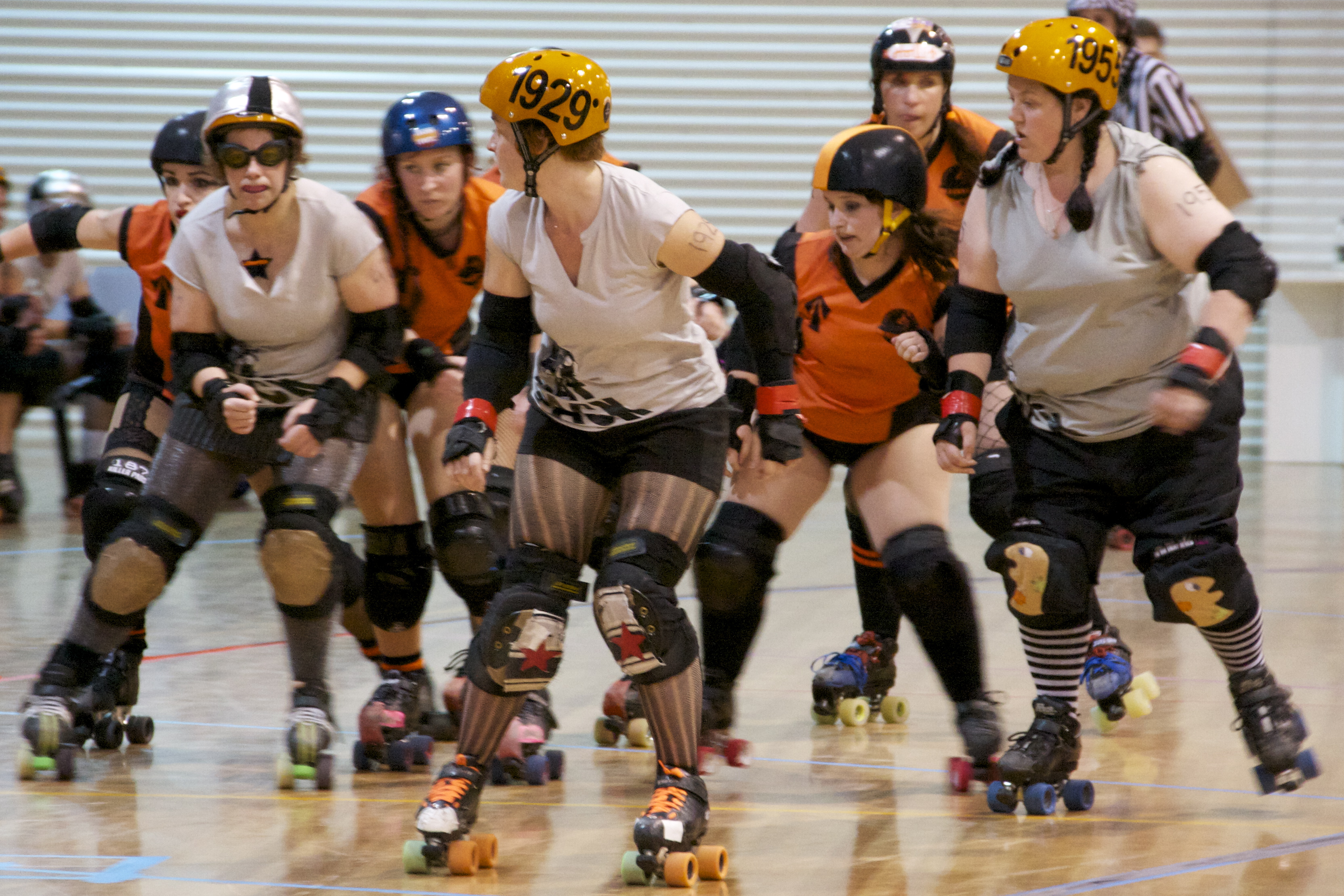
- Teams competing in Hobart, Australia, in November 2010
- Governing body: Skate Australia

There are over eighty-nine roller derby leagues in Australia. in women's, men's, co-ed and junior categories.

== Governance ==
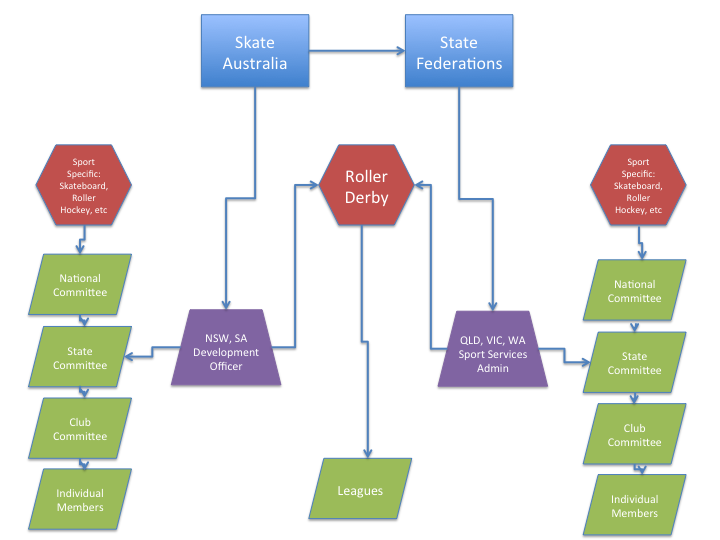
Chart showing governance of roller derby inside Skate Australia. Derived from information found on page 10 of Skate Australia's strategic plan.

Skate Australia provides a minimal level of insurance for some roller derby leagues in Australia. According to Skate Australia's 2009–2013 strategic plan, the governance of roller derby is different from other sports affiliated with the organisation. Roller derby lacks state committees, with leagues going straight to the Development Officer and Sport Services Administrator. In 2006, there were no roller derby memberships in Skate Australia. By 2008, three percent of all members were from the roller derby community.

== World cup ==
Australia's national team, Team Australia, debuted at the inaugural Roller Derby World Cup in 2011, coming in fourth place out of 13 teams. In 2014, Team Australia took third out of 30, in 2018 came in second of 38 teams, and in 2025 Australia was second out of 48 teams.

== Interstate Bouting ==
Between the Adelaide Roller Derby's 2007 formation and the start of their first season, the club hosted the first interstate roller derby competition in Australia, Skate of Origin, against the Victorian Roller Derby League.

=== Great Southern Slam ===
2010 saw Adelaide Roller Derby hosting the Great Southern Slam – the largest roller derby competition to be held outside of the United States, with 650 competitors from Australia and New Zealand.

Adelaide Roller Derby again hosted The Great Southern Slam in the June long weekend of 2012 and this time boasted over 1000 participants in the main tournament, match play for less experienced leagues, and a series of challenge bouts. The main tournament consisted of 18 leagues including two from New Zealand with Victorian Roller Derby League taking out top honours in a repeat performance from 2010 over Sun State Roller Girls.

== Leagues by state ==
=== Australian Capital Territory ===
Canberra Roller Derby bout Brindabelters vs Black and Blue Belles at Southern Cross Stadium on 24 September 2011

- Canberra – Canberra Roller Derby League
- Canberra – Varsity Derby League

=== New South Wales ===
- Coffs Harbour – Coffs Coast Derby
- Illawarra – Wollongong Illawarra Roller Derby
- Katoomba – Blue Mountains Roller Derby
- Newcastle – Newcastle Roller Derby League
- Northern Beaches – Northern Beaches Roller Derby
- Sydney – Inner West Roller Derby League
- Sydney – South Side Derby Dolls
- Sydney – Sydney Roller Derby League
- Sydney – Western Sydney Rollers

=== Victoria ===
- Ballarat – Ballarat Roller Derby League
- Bendigo – Dragon City Roller Derby
- East Victoria Region – East Vic Roller Derby
- Geelong – Geelong Roller Derby League
- Kingston – Kingston City Rollers
- Melbourne – Diamond Valley Roller Derby Club
- Melbourne – Northside Rollers
- Melbourne – South Sea Roller Derby
- Melbourne – Victorian Roller Derby League
- West Footscray – WestSide Roller Derby

=== Queensland ===
- Brisbane – Northern Brisbane Rollers
- Brisbane – Sun State Roller Derby
- Brisbane – Brisbane City Rollers
- Gold Coast – Gold Coast Derby Grrls
- Mackay – Mackay City Rollers
- Rockhampton – Rocky Roller Derby
- Sunshine Coast – Coastal Assassins Roller Derby

=== South Australia ===
- Adelaide – Adelaide Roller Derby
- Adelaide – Light City Derby
- Adelaide – Lil' Adelaide Rollers
- Adelaide – Rockabellas Roller Derby League
- Campbelltown – Murder City Roller Derby

=== Tasmania ===
- Hobart – Convict City Roller Derby League
- Launceston – Van Diemen Rollers

=== Western Australia ===
- Albany – Albany Roller Derby League
- Geraldton – Geraldton Roller Derby
- Kwinana – Dread Pirate Rollers
- Margaret River – Margaret River Roller Derby
- Perth – Perth Roller Derby
- Perth – Western Australia Roller Derby

== See also ==
- Roller derby
