= Team Australia (roller derby) =

Women's roller derby team

- Founded: 2011
- Colors: Green, gold and white
- Head coach: Sausarge Rolls, Zac Buckley
- Manager: Her Supreme Excellency Silver Medallist Cindy Frost
- Championships: 4th place at 2011 Roller Derby World Cup 3rd place at 2014 Roller Derby World Cup

Team Australia represents Australia in women's international roller derby, under the WFTDA rule set, in play such as at the Roller Derby World Cup. The team was first formed to compete at the 2011 World Cup in Toronto, and finished the tournament in fourth place, beating Team Sweden by 126 points 80 in their quarterfinal, but losing to Team USA 532 to 4 in the semifinal, and to Team England 203 to 85 in the third-place playoff. Before the event, coach Thigh-dal Wave stated that the team aimed to play against the United States and to beat Team New Zealand.

Team Australia finished in third place at the 2014 Roller Derby World Cup in Dallas, and competed in the 2018 World Cup in Manchester, where they were defeated in the finals by USA Roller Derby.

== Team roster ==
=== 2017-18 team roster ===
Team roster formed in 2017 for the 2018 Roller Derby World Cup.

Number	Name	League
00	Bond	Victorian Roller Derby League
010	Giles	Victorian Roller Derby League
10	Bicepsual	Victorian Roller Derby League
11	Sarah Chambers	Victorian Roller Derby League
111	Wheels McCoy	Perth Roller Derby
128	Blondage	Victorian Roller Derby League
130	Dire Skates	Victorian Roller Derby League
1337	Freudian Slit	Canberra Roller Derby League
14	Christy Demons	Victorian Roller Derby League
180	SX	Sun State Roller Girls
192	Foxy La Roux	Victorian Roller Derby League
20	Lorrae Evans	Victorian Roller Derby League
216	Moody Bitch	Sydney Roller Derby League
2806	Dani Darko	Victorian Roller Derby League
314	Pi-Curious	Victorian Roller Derby League
32	Jambi	Sun State Roller Girls
35	Anna Conned Her	Victorian Roller Derby League
358	Janaa Nuku	Victorian Roller Derby League
38	Bone Shaker	Victorian Roller Derby League
4	Slamazon	Convict City Roller Derby League
5	Sweet Enemy	Boston Roller Derby
66	Screw Barrymore	Victorian Roller Derby League
7	Spinach	Sun State Roller Girls
85	Bianca Sciarretta	Victorian Roller Derby League
88	Tui Lyon	Angel City Derby Girls
COACH	Zac Buckley	Sun State Roller Girls
COACH	Sausarge Rolls	Devil State Derby League
-	Cindy Frost (manager)	Northside Rollers
-	Mav Rickey	Victoria Men's Roller Derby

=== 2014 team roster ===
In December 2013, Team Australia announced their 2014 roster. (skaters' league affiliations as of the time of the announcement)

Number	Name	League
10	Bicepsual	Victorian Roller Derby League
10	G-Banger	Victorian Roller Derby League
11	Lady Killer	Sun State Roller Girls
117	Chop Chop	Brisbane City Rollers
12	Rose Ruin	Sun State Roller Girls
14	Christy Demons	Paradise City Roller Derby
20	Beth Adder	Northern Brisbane Rollers
2880	Blue Wrenegade	Adelaide Roller Derby
4	Calamity Maim	Victorian Roller Derby League
41	Lil Gee Unit	Northern Brisbane Rollers
411	Bambi von Smash’er	Canberra Roller Derby League
411	Blockodile Dundee	Sun State Roller Girls
45	Cookie Cutter	Sun State Roller Girls
48	Muzzarati	Sun State Roller Girls
TOP5	Susy Pow	Charm City Roller Girls
50x	Freyda Cox	Sydney Roller Derby League
505	Mad Mel Arena	Victorian Roller Derby League
58	Dodge&Bolt	Sun State Roller Girls
6	ShortStop	Canberra Roller Derby League
601	Colonel KAOS!	Adelaide Roller Derby
76	Brutal Deluxe	Northern Brisbane Rollers
77	Shaggle Frock	Canberra Roller Derby League
782	Tiger	Victorian Roller Derby League
8	Annabelle Lecter	Northern Brisbane Rollers
8	Polly Crackers	Sun State Roller Girls
88	Tui Lyon	Victorian Roller Derby League
9lives	Kit Cat Krunch	Adelaide Roller Derby
BENCH COACH	Flamin’ Galah (Bench Coach)	Victorian Roller Derby League
BENCH MANAGER	Slawta Dawta (Bench Manager)	Sun State Roller Girls
TOUR MANAGER	Cherry Axe-Wound (Tour Manager)	Canberra Roller Derby League

=== 2011 team roster ===
Team Australia roller derby logo 2011

Team Australia announced their first roster of twenty skaters in September 2011, which played at the 2011 Roller Derby World Cup. (skaters' league affiliations as of the time of the announcement)

Number	Name	League
1st	King Cam	Canberra Roller Derby League
10	Juke Nukem	Brisbane City Rollers
106	Tricksey Beltem	Adelaide Roller Derby
11	Ladykiller	Sun State Roller Girls
12	Rose Ruin	Sun State Roller Girls
28	Muzzarati	Sun State Roller Girls
24	Ruby Ribcrusher	Victorian Roller Derby League
308	Amykazee	Canberra Roller Derby League
40	U Sooz U Lose	Victorian Roller Derby League
XL40	XL	Sun State Roller Girls
411	Bambi von Smash'er	Canberra Roller Derby League
44	Slawta Dawta	Sun State Roller Girls
45	Cookie Cutter	Sun State Roller Girls
TOP5	Susy Pow	Newcastle Roller Derby League
58	Dodge & Bolt	Coastal Assassins Roller Derby
6	Short Stop	Canberra Roller Derby League
M8	Blockidile Dundee	Sun State Roller Girls
801	Haterade	Sydney Roller Derby League
911	Sculley	Sun State Roller Girls
99	Fang Fiend	Brisbane City Rollers

== Junior Team Australia ==
=== 2015 Junior World Cup ===
In April 2015 the Inaugural Junior Team Australia squad was announced to represent Australia at the first ever Junior Roller Derby World Cup in Kent, Washington during July 2015. The junior squad is open gender.

Number	Name	League
101	Hannah Monslamher	Lil' Adelaide Rollers
E105	Ace Of Sades	WestSide Derby Dolls
127	Mr Flibble	Hobart Junior Roller Derby
1305	Mini Tricks	Lil' Adelaide Rollers
1907	Teenage Rampage	Lil' Adelaide Rollers
242	Snapperazzi	Lil' Adelaide Rollers
243	Stelz Belz	Hobart Junior Roller Derby
25	Smash n Dash	Blue Mountains Junior Roller Derby
32	Luna Eclipse	Lil' Adelaide Rollers
34	Zume Minx	Cairns Junior Rollers
355	Elk-er Skelter	Blue Mountains Junior Roller Derby
38	Roller Stomp-Her	Lil' Adelaide Rollers
55	Jackass Jazz	Little Brisbane Roller Girls
603	Dizzy Reaper	Lil' Adelaide Rollers
66	Jed I Knight	Sunshine Coast Area Rollers
666	Satans Rose	Lil' Adelaide Rollers
74	Hello Hitty	Blue Mountains Junior Roller Derby
77	The Dolly Llama	Little Brisbane Roller Girls
9	Iszabordination	Little Brisbane Roller Girls
934	Whomping Willow	Hobart Junior Roller Derby

=== 2018 Junior World Cup ===
The following squad represented Australia at the second Junior Roller Derby World Cup in Feasterville-Trevose, Pennsylvania during July 2018.

Number	Name	League
02	Rumble Bea	Toowoomba City Rollers
1	KO Cutie	Little Brisbane Roller Girls
101	Wolf	Coastal Juniors
106	Mad Katter	Ballarat Roller Derby League
1300	Red R'owe'ch	Newcastle Junior Roller Derby
1357	CD Rascal	Newcastle Junior Roller Derby
1407	Miss Conduct	Canberra Junior Roller Derby
1618	Ironstein	Newcastle Junior Roller Derby
17	Bossanova Bree	Victoria Roller Derby League
19	Dark Side Of Doom	Lil' Adelaide Rollers
202	Angel Backstab	Canberra Junior Roller Derby
242	Stockwell	Lil' Adelaide Rollers
26	Crazy Daisy	Little Brisbane Roller Girls
266	Tuff Cookie	Lil' Adelaide Rollers
31	Fire	Blue Mountains Junior Roller Derby
33	Tara McEvoy	Lil' Adelaide Rollers
355	Elk-er Skelter	Blue Mountains Junior Roller Derby
4	Princess Jam Slam	Little Brisbane Roller Girls
60	Yeah Nah	Toowoomba City Rollers
808	Baddi	Blue Mountains Junior Roller Derby
99	Bonfire	Victoria Roller Derby League

=== 2023 Junior World Cup ===
2023 marked the first time Junior Team Australia took home a medal, securing third place in Valence, France.

Number	Name
00	Cicada
06	Storm
08	Ratbag
16	Jazzy Devil
161	The Nothing
198	Rat Guru
205	Honey Jacknife
22	Imogen Szegedi
247	Special K
30	Rainbow Crash
387	Amazon
39	Katniss Everdoom
42	Bruizin' Cruizer
426	Bazinga!
503	Snake Venom
54	Rainbow Crash
55	Dust Devil
567	CC Slicer
73	Violet Crumble
88	Heat Seeker

=== 2025 Junior World Cup ===
The 2025 Junior World Cup marked the first time Junior Team Australia had two teams, one open division and the other female division.

==== Open Division ====
Number	Name	League
00	Cicada	Hobart Junior Roller Derby
04	Corpse Stance	Little Brisbane Roller Girls
09	Morris Minor	Cradle Coast Junior Derby
198	Rat Guru	Rockabellas Roller Derby League
205	Honey	Lil' Adelaide Rollers
22	Sonic Dash	East Vic Roller Derby
24	Guns N Rollers	Wollongong Illawarra Roller Derby
299	Light Speed	Rockabellas Roller Derby League
30	Rainbow	Rockabellas Roller Derby League
359	Firefly	Mackay City Rollers
387	Amazon	Lil' Adelaide Rollers
42	Cruizer	Lil' Adelaide Rollers
43	SeaSalt	Hobart Junior Roller Derby
452	Flame ThrowHer	Rockabellas Roller Derby League
55	Dust Devil	Mackay City Rollers
67	Dragon	Mackay City Rollers
789	Jack Plague	Newcastle Junior Roller Derby
82	Bruiser Bon	South East Magic Rollers
84	Tilly Tornado	Cradle Coast Junior Derby
99	Cherry Bomb	Towns Villains Roller Derby

==== Female Division ====
Number	Name	League
0	Quiver	Mackay City Rollers
002	Two-Up	Central Coast Roller Derby United
08	Ratbag	Toowoomba City Rollers
11	Spitfire	Hobart Junior Roller Derby
13	Sarah	Lil' Adelaide Rollers
16	Raptor	Sydney Roller Derby League
16	Pocket Rocket	Mackay City Rollers
188	Iris	Rockabellas Roller Derby League
19	Flying Fox	Canberra Roller Derby League
19	Double Whammy	WestSide Roller Derby
24	Artemis	Dragon City Roller Derby
247	Livid Love	Margaret River Roller Derby
3	Nells Bells	South East Magic Rollers
321	Madness	East Vic Roller Derby
416	Glare Bear	Central Coast Derby
51	Wheelz	Lil' Adelaide Rollers
53	Masho	Dragon City Roller Derby
6	Cat Crusader	Cradle Coast Junior Derby
66	April O'Wheel	East Vic Roller Derby
77	Slappy Lil Vegemite	Lil' Adelaide Rollers
