= South Sea Roller Derby =

Roller derby league

- Metro area: Melbourne, Victoria
- Country: Australia
- Founded: 2009
- Teams: Sirens (A team); Banshees (B team)
- Track type: Flat
- Venue: Springers Leisure Centre
- Affiliations: WFTDA
- Website: www.southsearollerderby.com

South Sea Roller Derby (SSRD) is a women's flat track roller derby league based in south-eastern Melbourne in Victoria, Australia. South Sea has two travel teams that play teams from other leagues. South Sea is a member of the Women's Flat Track Derby Association (WFTDA).

== History ==
South Sea Roller Derby (SSRD) was founded by former Victorian Roller Derby League (VRDL) member, Misty Meaner, in 2009, after VRDL moved its training location and her travel time dramatically increased. This sparked an idea to create a league to cater for girls living on the south east side of the city. After scouting around, she found Peninsula Skateworld at Carrum Downs, whose owners were keen to help bring roller derby to the area. Recruitment of skaters began in early 2009, with regular training sessions starting in August. Lady Malice, a former VRDL fresh meat coordinator, offered her services as a coach.

South Sea Roller Derby held its first public home bout on 28 August 2010, and Sirens played their first travel team game against Ballarat Roller Derby League on 13 November. Bouting against Ballarat (BRDL) at the end of the year has now become an annual tradition. In 2011, South Sea lost all its bouts against other leagues from Victoria, but did beat Western Australia Roller Derby in Perth.

SSRD competed in the Great Southern Slam tournament in 2012, where they managed a win over Geelong Roller Derby League, but lost heavily to the Sun State Roller Girls. 2012 was also the first year the league B team, The Banshees, made their debut, defeating a combined NSR/LCRD team and then losing to a full NSR lineup.

In January 2013, South Sea was accepted as a member of the Women's Flat Track Derby Association Apprentice Programme. By this point, the league had around 150 skaters, and thousands of fans.

In November 2013, South Sea came third in the inaugural Vic Tas Tournament, a dual-state tournament comprising 16 teams from Victoria and Tasmania. The Banshees also won their only game of the season against Bendigo's Chiko Rollers. 2013 also saw the introduction of the league's third hometeam, The Blackheart Breakers, which increased the home games for the year to 6 instead of 4.

South Sea gained full membership in the WFTDA in July 2014.

As of 2015, South Seas disbanded their three home teams, the Blackheart Breakers, Cutthroat Charmers and Dolly Rogers, to focus on their two travel teams, the South Sea Sirens and the Banshees.

== WFTDA rankings ==
Season	Final ranking	Playoffs	Championship
2015	247 WFTDA	DNQ	DNQ
2016	265 WFTDA	DNQ	DNQ
