= Wollongong Illawarra Roller Derby =

Roller derby league

- Metro area: Wollongong, New South Wales
- Country: Australia
- Founded: 2009
- Teams: Steel City Derby Dolls (Women's); Steel City Rollers (Mixed gender); Nuts and Bolts (Junior)
- Track type: Flat
- Venue: University of Wollongong Sports HUB
- Org. type: Incorporated Not for Profit sports club
- Website: https://www.revolutionise.com.au/wird

Wollongong Illawarra Roller Derby (WIRD) is a flat-track roller derby league based in New South Wales, Australia.

== History ==
Founded in February 2009 by the referee Sintax, the league consisted of two home teams, the Vipers and the Vixens, and a mixed travel team. The league played its first bout in November of the same year.

During the following year, the team bouted against the Newcastle Dockyard Dames, Sun State Roller Girls and Sydney Roller Derby League, with the Newcastle bout attracting a capacity crowd of around 1,000 fans. Although the league entered the 2010 National Tournament, the Great Southern Slam, it lost both bouts, playing the day after the entire team got food poisoning.

By 2011, the league had more than forty skaters, and took fourth place in the inaugural NSW Eastern Region Roller Derby Tournament.

In 2012, the league again competed in the Great Southern Slam, losing in the first round to the Northern Brisbane Rollers, then in a close-fought bout to the Pirate City Rollers. Wollongong eventually placed last of eighteen competing teams who participated in the Great Southern Slam

Wollongong also entered the Eastern Region Roller Derby Tournament in 2012, again placing fourth in the A-grade division which also included Canberra Roller Derby League, Sydney Roller Derby League and Newcastle Roller Derby League.

In October 2012, Wollongong was accepted as a member of the Women's Flat Track Derby Association Apprentice Program.

In January 2013 the league pared back to two teams, an A and B-level travel team known as the Steel City Derby Dolls.

The league had many skaters come and go during the years to follow, the Steel City Derby Dolls continued to compete in many events across Australia and eventually the decided to begin a training program that included all genders. With this decision also came the choice to move away from the WFTDA Apprentice Program and concentrate on local events.

2019 was the year WIRD sent its first mixed-gender team "Steel City Rollers" to compete in the United Roller Derby playoffs and began training their first Junior team, the Steel City Nuts and Bolts.
