= Newcastle Roller Derby League =

Roller derby league

- Metro area: Newcastle, New South Wales
- Country: Australia
- Founded: 2009
- Teams: SuperNovas (A team); Harbour Hellcats; Fort Smashleys; Bogey Rollers
- Track type: Flat
- Venue: Gateshead Sportsworld
- Affiliations: WFTDA
- Website: newcastlerollerderby.org.au

Newcastle Roller Derby League (NRDL) is a flat track roller derby league founded in 2009, based in Newcastle, New South Wales. Their representative team is the SuperNovas, while their three home teams are the Harbour Hellcats, the Fort Smashleys and the Bogey Rollers.

== League History ==
From its inception in early 2009, by mid-2010 the league had more than 100 skaters.

Susy Pow, a skater from the league, was selected to skate for Team Australia at the 2011 Roller Derby World Cup.

In February 2018, Newcastle became a member league of the WFTDA Apprentice Program, and graduated to full membership early in 2019.

== Teams ==
=== Home Teams ===
The league has three in-house teams (home teams) who participate in intraleague competitions: the Fort Smashleys, Harbour Hellcats and the Bogey Rollers.

Created in 2011, the Fort Smashleys and Harbour Hellcats are the league's original in-house teams, with the Bogey Rollers being added in 2013. Harbour Hellcats won the first four seasons of the NRDL in-house competition, while the Fort Smashleys won their first season competition in 2013 against newcomers the Bogey Rollers. The name "Fort Smashleys" is a play on Fort Scratchley, a museum and former coastal defence site on the local harbour.

=== Travel Team ===
Formerly known as the Dockyard Dames, the SuperNovas are the representative team for NRDL, and consists of the top NRDL players.

The SuperNovas have played teams from all around Australia and New Zealand, including Victorian Roller Derby League, Sydney Roller Derby League, Pirate City Rollers, Northern Brisbane Rollers and many more along the way.

The SuperNovas have finished third in the Eastern Region Roller Derby competition for four years in a row. Starting in 2010, the league has regularly participated in the Great Southern Slam, a tournament developed and run by Adelaide Roller Derby, which brings together leagues from Australia and New Zealand in competition.

== WFTDA competition ==
Season	Final ranking	Playoffs	Championship
2024	15 Oceania	DNQ	DNQ

== See also ==
- List of roller derby leagues
