= Sun State Roller Derby =

Roller derby league

- Metro area: Brisbane, Queensland
- Country: Australia
- Founded: 2007
- Teams: Swarm (A team); Defiants; Vandals; Furies; Riots
- Track type(s): Flat
- Venue: Digi Roller Skating Rink, Hillcrest
- Affiliations: Skate Australia, WFTDA
- Org. type: Incorporated; Not-for-profit
- Website: sunstaterollerderby.org

Sun State Roller Derby is a women's flat track roller derby based in Brisbane, in the Australian state of Queensland. Suns State was established in 2007 and has been a member of the international Women's Flat Track Derby Association (WFTDA) since 2013.

== History ==
Sun State Roller Derby was founded as Sun State Roller Girls in 2007. In March 2007, the league held a public demonstration bout at Sportsmotion, Slacks Creek, as a recruitment drive. By 2010, membership of the league was over 170.

Sun State has had 3 league splits — with members leaving to form new leagues. Northern Brisbane Rollers (in January 2008), Gold Coast Roller Derby (in October 2008) and Brisbane City Rollers (in January 2009) all formed out of splits from Sun State.

Eight of the league's skaters were members of Team Australia for the 2011 Roller Derby World Cup. Team Australia finished 4th overall.

== Organisation and governance ==
Sun State Roller Derby is one of several leagues in the Brisbane area. The league focuses on representing skaters in Beenleigh and Logan. One of the league's organisational missions is to promote the empowerment of women and to improve the health, well being and personal growth of women in the area. The league is only open to female skaters, but males participate in the league in organisational positions.

The league is a volunteer run, not for profit organisation governed by a committee that meets monthly and includes elected positions such as: secretary, treasurer, team representatives and a non-bouting member representative. Several positions are held by appointment, including sponsorship officer, fundraising officer, media officer, head official, non-skating official coordinator and head coach. The Sun State Roller Girls annual general meeting is held in October of each year.

In July 2012, Sun State was accepted as a member of the Women's Flat Track Derby Association Apprentice Programme. Sun State became Australia's second full members of the Women’s Flat Track Derby Association in June, 2013.

== Interleague competition ==
Former Sun State logo

2009
In July 2009, Sun State played its first interleague bout against Victorian Roller Derby League("VRDL"). In the first Queensland interleague bout, "South vs North" on 28 November 2009 at the Beenleigh Arena, Sun State defeated Northern Brisbane Rollers ("NBR").

Date	Win	Lose	Score
4 Jul 2009	Victoria	Sun State	117 - 99
28 Nov 2009	Sun State	NBR	164 - 124

2010
In 2010, the league competed in the Great Southern Slam, Australia's first roller derby tournament. After defeating Woollongong and Townsville/Brisbane City Rollers in the preliminary pool rounds, the Sun State Roller Girls defeated local Brisbane rivals Northern Brisbane Rollers in the quarter-finals. They met and defeated Adelaide Roller Derby in the semi-finals, before losing to the Victorian Roller Derby League in the dying seconds of the grand final. The tournament saw Sun State emerge as the highest ranked team in Queensland.

Date	Win	Lose	Score
12 June 2010	Sun State	Woollongong	178 - 16
12 June 2010	Sun State	Townsville	168 - 7
12 June 2010	Sun State	NBR	184 - 28
13 June 2010	Sun State	Adelaide	124 - 60
13 June 2010	Victoria	Sun State	78 - 76

2011
In 2011, the league played a number of interleague bouts. The 30 April 2011 re-match between Sun State and Victorian Roller Derby League at the Gold Coast Convention Centre was billed as the derby grudge match of the year in Australia by Skate Australia. Victoria won the game to continue their undefeated record against Sun State. On 6 August 2011, Sun State defeated the Canberra Roller Derby League at the Australian Institute of Sport. After a last minute cancellation from a New Zealand league, the Brisbane City Rollers ("BCR") played Sun State on 27 August at the Beenleigh Arena, with Sun State being victorious. Sun State defeated the Sydney Roller Derby League on 22 October at Sydney Olympic Park.

In November 2011, Sun State competed in and won the inaugural Tropicarnage Cup, a Queensland roller derby tournament which attracted nine teams from across the state. Sun State progressed through their first game against Reef City Roller Girls (Cairns) before playing Townsville Roller Derby in the tournament semi-finals. Sun State defeated Northern Brisbane Rollers in the Tropicarnage Cup final.

In late November 2011, Sun State competed in their first international bout, competing against Rat City Rollergirls from Seattle, Washington, in the first game of a double header played by Rat City against Sun State and Northern Brisbane Rollers. Rat City, unofficially ranked number 5 in the world at the time, strongly defeated Sun State.

Date	Win	Lose	Score
30 April 2011	Victoria	Sun State	124 - 93
6 August 2011	Sun State	Canberra	181 - 48
27 August 2011	Sun State	BCR	360 - 26
22 October 2011	Sun State	Sydney	257 - 61
19 November 2011	Sun State	Reef City	195 - 30
19 November 2011	Sun State	Townsville	204 - 52
20 November 2011	Sun State	NBR	253 - 44
26 November 2011	Rat City	Sun State	232 - 56

2012
In 2012, the league competed in the second ever Great Southern Slam (TGSS), as well as competing in several other interleague games. The interleague season commenced on 24 March 2012 with a rematch of the 2011 game between Sun State and Canberra Roller Derby League at the Beenleigh Arena, with Sun State again defeating Canberra convincingly.

This was the only interleague activity before TGSS on 9–11 June 2012. On the first day of TGSS, Sun State recorded solid wins over Geelong Roller Derby League and South Seas Roller Derby, advancing to the quarter- and semi-finals held on the second day of the tournament. In the quarter-final, Sun State controlled Sydney Roller Derby League to advance to an afternoon semi-final against the Northern Brisbane Rollers, defeating them in the closest game between the two leagues since 2009 and advancing to the Grand Final against Victorian Roller Derby League. The Grand Final was a hard-fought battle, with Victoria coming out on top, cementing Sun State's rank at second in the nation.

Date	Win	Lose	Score
24 March 2012	Sun State	Canberra	238 - 98
9 June 2012	Sun State	Geelong	131 - 62
9 June 2012	Sun State	South Seas	193 - 13
10 June 2012	Sun State	Sydney	195 - 94
10 June 2012	Sun State	NBR	159 - 110
11 June 2012	Victoria	Sun State	198 - 115

== WFTDA competition ==
In June 2013, Sun State became a full member of the Women's Flat Track Derby Association (WFTDA), thus making them eligible for WFTDA rankings and Playoffs. Their debut in the rankings came in December 2014 at 20th overall. In 2015, Sun State qualified for Division 1 Playoffs for the first time, entering the Dallas Playoff as the seventh seed and finishing in eighth place. In 2016, Sun State returned to Division 1 Playoffs, entering the Montreal tournament as the eighth seed and finishing the weekend in ninth place. Sun State was eligible for Division 2 in 2017, but declined their invitation to Playoffs. In 2018, Sun State was the sixth seed at the WFTDA Playoffs in Atlanta, and finished the weekend out of the medals with a consolation round victory over Rat City Roller Derby, 250-58.

=== WFTDA rankings ===
Season	Final ranking	Playoffs	Championship
2014	20 WFTDA	N/A	N/A
2015	23 WFTDA	8 D1	DNQ
2016	26 WFTDA	9 D1	DNQ
2017	22 WFTDA	N/A	DNP D2
2018	30 WFTDA	CR	DNQ

- DNP = did not play
- CR = consolation round

== Intraleague competition ==
2008
Sun State Roller Girls' first season was between two teams: the Golden Roughs ("Roughs") and Liquorice Short Shorts ("Shorties"). Three public intraleague games were played in the 2008 season, beginning on 13 September 2008, with the Liquorice Short Shorts winning on all three occasions.

Date	Win	Lose	Score
13 Sep 2008	Shorties	Roughs	140 - 102
11 Oct 2008	Shorties	Roughs	100 - 96
8 Nov 2008	Shorties	Roughs	149 - 119

2009
The Roughs and Shorties met six times in the 2009 season, with the Golden Roughs taking the season title – winning four bouts to two. Audience numbers grew to over 1500 per bout.

Date	Win	Lose	Score
7 Mar 2009	Roughs	Shorties	134 - 129
18 Apr 2009	Roughs	Shorties	135 - 125
30 May 2009	Roughs	Shorties	104 - 100
7 Aug 2009	Shorties	Roughs	137 - 116
19 Sep 2009	Shorties	Roughs	144 - 125
31 Oct 2009	Roughs	Shorties	139 - 109

2010
2010 was the final season in which the Sun State Roller Girls featured the Golden Roughs and Liquorice Short Shorts teams. Six regular season games were played as well as a grand final on 27 November 2010, with the Roughs again victorious four bouts to three.

Date	Win	Lose	Score
13 Mar 2010	Shorties	Roughs	119 - 96
24 Apr 2010	Shorties	Roughs	174 - 76
5 June 2010	Roughs	Shorties	92 - 88
21 Aug 2010	Roughs	Shorties	99 - 87
18 Sep 2010	Roughs	Shorties	130 - 83
30 Oct 2010	Shorties	Roughs	111 - 101
27 Nov 2010	Roughs	Shorties	116 - 111

2011
In 2011 the Sun State Roller Girls dissolved the Golden Roughs and Liquorice Short Shorts, and the skaters were reallocated into three new teams — the Defiants, Vandals and Furies. Six games were played during the intraleague season, with each team playing the other teams twice. The grand final was played on 17 December as a double header bout, with the third place Furies playing Newcastle Roller Derby League before the grand final was played between the Defiants and Vandals. The Furies defeated Newcastle, and the Vandals were crowned the 2011 winners.

Date	Win	Lose	Score
12 Feb 2011	Defiants	Vandals	137 - 87
2 Apr 2011	Vandals	Furies	152 - 48
21 May 2011	Defiants	Furies	178 - 109
23 Jul 2011	Vandals	Defiants	129 - 101
10 Sep 2011	Furies	Vandals	106 - 52
8 Oct 2011	Furies	Defiants	132 - 60
17 Dec 2011	Furies	Newcastle	120 - 58
17 Dec 2011	Vandals	Defiants	149 - 99

2012
In 2012, Sun State added a fourth team to their intraleague competition, the Riots. The season was expanded to 12 games, plus a third place playoff and grand final, to be played throughout 2012.

Date	Win	Lose	Score
19 Feb 2012	Vandals	Defiants	120 - 88
10 Mar 2012	Riots	Furies	233 - 147
1 Apr 2012	Defiants	Furies	229 - 126
21 Apr 2012	Defiants	Vandals	170 - 135
13 May 2012	Furies	Vandals	161 - 84
26 May 2012	Defiants	Riots	130 - 115
24 Jun 2012	Furies	Riots	138 - 130

== Contributions to the community ==
Sun State Roller Derby is active in the local community. One dollar from each intraleague bout ticket sold goes to a local charity. In 2009, the league was invited to welcome international students to Brisbane at the City Council's 'International Student Day' expo. League members helped run the Dress for Success official name-change fundraiser. The league donated $1000 to Southside Education School For Girls and $5000 to Dress for Success. In 2010, the league held a shoe/handbag/jewellery drive, helped run a fundraising gala for Dress For Success, and raised $250 for The Brain Foundation (on behalf of the Brisbane Zombie Walk ) and donated $7500 to Fitted for Work. In 2011, the league organised a group blood donation for the Australian Red Cross, where league members donated blood while wearing the popular Sun State "Give Blood, Play Roller Derby" T-shirt.

== Media coverage ==
Sun State was featured in Roller Derby Dolls, a half-hour documentary by the Australian Broadcasting Corporation (ABC).

== See also ==
- List of roller derby leagues
- Roller derby in Australia
