= Team Australia (disambiguation) =

Team Australia may refer to:

- Team Australia, a sponsored identity of Champ Car auto racing team Walker Racing
- Team Australia, an entry identity for a Superleague Formula auto racing team run by Alan Docking Racing
- A1 Team Australia, an auto racing team that competed in A1 Grand Prix
- The Australia international rules football team which competes annually against Ireland
- The Australian national ice hockey team, also called the Mighty Roos
- Team Australia (roller derby)

== See also ==
- Sport in Australia
- Category:National sports teams of Australia
