= This Is Roller Derby =

- Directed by: Daniel Hayward
- Written by: Daniel Hayward
- Starring: April Ritzenthaler
- Production company: Aisle 5 Pictures
- Distributed by: Titan View
- Release date: 11 October 2011
- Running time: 82 minutes
- Country: Australia
- Language: English

This Is Roller Derby is a 2011 Australian documentary film by Daniel Hayward on four Australian roller derby teams over the course of a season.

The film features members from roller derby associations from Australia and the United States, primarily the Ballarat Roller Derby League. The DVD for the film released on 20 February 2013.

== Synopsis ==
The film follows four Australian roller derby leagues, Ballarat Roller Derby League, Adelaide Roller Derby, Canberra Roller Derby League and Geelong Roller Derby League, over the course of twelve months, and documents the start of roller derby in Australia and overseas.

== Cast and crew ==
The film was directed by Daniel Hayward and features members from the Ballarat Roller Derby League and members from US leagues, particularly Texas Rollergirls and TXRD Lonestar Rollergirls.

Some featured Roller Derby skaters include:

- April Ritzenthaler (Narrator)
- Katrina "Mad Mac" MacDonald
- Haylee "Seven Lux" Hartley
- Rebekah "Apocalypse Nerd" Bailey
- Sarah "Barrelhouse Bessy" Strong-Law
- Nadia "Smartypants" Keane
- Michelle "Miss Hellfire" Murrel
- Kim "Jelli Knight" Adams

== Reception ==
Filmink gave a positive review for This Is Roller Derby, calling it a "gutsy and eye-opening insight into a sport on the rise and the world around it." SBS gave a mixed review for the film, saying that while the first half of the film has "genuine energy", that "in driving his material towards a feature-length running time of 80-odd minutes, Hayward steers into a cul-de-sac, showing longer extracts of the action from tournaments rather than digger deeper into some of the personal stories."
