= Inner West Roller Derby League =

Roller derby league

- Metro area: Sydney
- Country: Australia
- Founded: 2012
- Teams: Skatecrashers (A-Team); Bamshees (B-Team)
- Track type: Flat
- Website: innerwestrollerderby.com

Inner West Roller Derby League (IWRDL) is a roller derby league based in the Inner West of Sydney. Established in 2012, the team competes in local and national tournaments, including the 5x5 Roller Derby Championship and the Great Southern Slam. The league also travels interstate for friendly bouts to further awareness and development of the sport within Australia.

== Competition History ==
=== 2018 ===
IWRDL finished second in the 2018 5x5 Roller Derby Championship Division 1 tournament after a 281–102 loss to the Newcastle Dockyard Dames.

=== 2017 ===
IWRDL won the 2017 5x5 Roller Derby Championship Division 2 (Battlegrounds) title after a 2018–179 win over the Blue Mountains Roller Derby League.

=== 2016 ===
IWRDL finished the 2016 5x5 Roller Derby Championship season in 3rd place, after a 233–118 win over the Northern Beaches Roller Girls in the Division 2 competition

=== 2015 ===
IWRDL won the 2015 5x5 Roller Derby Championship Division 2 title after a 186–118 win over Central Coast Roller Derby United
