= Canberra Roller Derby League =

Roller derby league in Australia

- Coordinates: 35°24′53.87″S 149°3′46.59″E
- Metro area: Canberra, Australian Capital Territory
- Country: Australia
- Founded: 2008
- Teams: Vice City Rollers (A team); VCBETAMAX (B team); Capital Brawlers (C team); Black N Blue Belles; Brindabelters; Red Bellied Black Hearts; Surly Griffins
- Track type: Flat
- Venue: AIS Arena, Southern Cross Stadium, Tuggeranong
- Affiliations: WFTDA
- Website: canberrarollerderbyleague.com

The Canberra Roller Derby League (CRDL) is a Canberra-based roller derby league. It was created in 2008, with the first bouts occurring in 2009. Canberra is a member of the Women's Flat Track Derby Association (WFTDA).

The league features a four-team home league, plus the all-star Vice City Rollers, which represents the league in interleague play. At home bouts, the league has had attendances as high as 5,000, and has its own stable of officials who officiate the league and interstate bouts. The league's bouts are aired on ChannelVision, and they have had media coverage from 666 ABC Canberra.

== History ==
Canberra's representative team (which one imagines may struggle to attract ACT Government funding with such a name) is the Vice City Rollers. As I never tire of saying, the sheer diversity of Canberra life now, as exemplified by our having both a prostate-tinglingly terrific symphony orchestra and something as maniacal as an all-Amazon Roller Derby League, supports my belief that Canberra is the best city it's ever been.

— Ian Warden

The Canberra Roller Derby League (CRDL) was established in 2008 as a volunteer organisation intended to promote roller derby, women's health and sport in the Australian Capital Territory (ACT). The league was created by Bullseye Betty (Kate Murphy) and Dr Hell (Helen Doyle). Other early members include Roulette Rouge (Lucy Quinn) and Peachy Keen. The league was intended to resemble the burlesque, and was the first roller derby league in the ACT.

The league's first practices took place in parking lots around the Territory. Dr Hell and Bullseye Betty helped arrange a screening of Roller Derby Dolls, a documentary, on 28 July 2008 at The Front Cafe and Gallery in Lyneham in order to generate membership in the new league. At the start of its first season, the league had 26 skaters. The first public bout in 2009 took place at Southern Cross Stadium, Tuggeranong, before a sell out crowd. At the end of the 2009 season, additional information nights were held at The Front Cafe and Gallery on 25 August and The Hush Lounge in Phillip on 30 August, and the league held a demonstration at the 2009 UCI Mountain Bike & Trials World Championships. On 21 November 2009, it held a roller derby rodeo at the Southern Cross Stadium with tickets being sold at Smith's Bookshop. By 2011, tickets for the league's events would be sold through Ticketek.

The league's presence in Canberra has helped change the perception of the sport in the capital from an entertaining sideshow to a mainstream women's participation sport. The popularity of roller derby in Canberra has meant that CRDL cannot accommodate all the locals who wish to participate, resulting in the formation of Varsity Derby League as a student organisation at Australian National University in 2011.

CRDL helped other leagues in the country. In 2009, members of the league competed as substitutes for the Sydney Roller Derby League's Screaming Assault Sirens in its grand final, after one member of the Sirens was quarantined with swine flu, and several other skaters were out injured.

Canberra Roller Derby League was featured in the 2012 documentary This Is Roller Derby.

== Organisation and structure ==
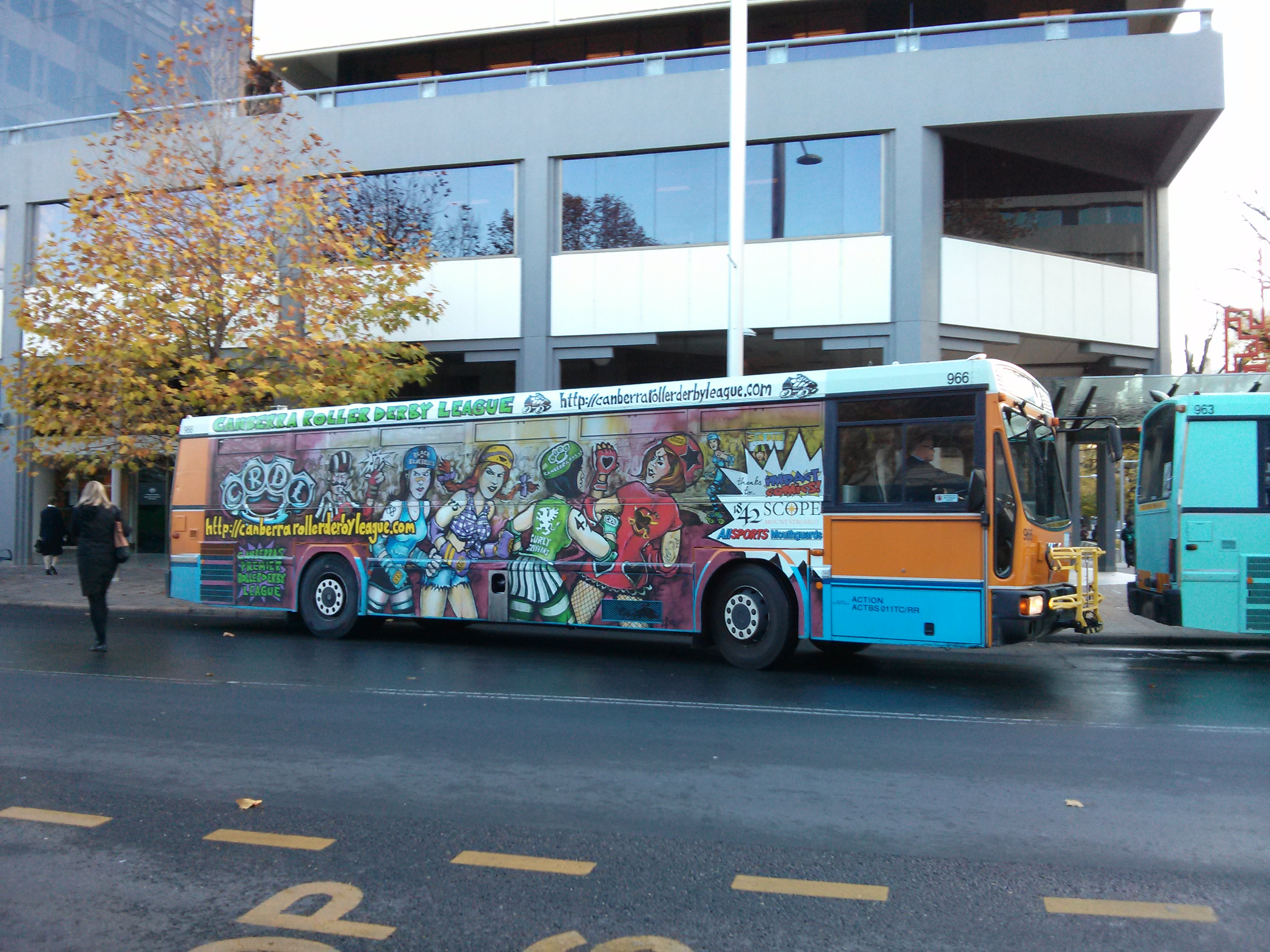
An ACTION bus painted with an advertisement for CRDL. This advertisement was paid for by four of the league's sponsors.

Bullseye Bettie was the league president from 2008 to 2009, followed by Cherry Axe-Wound from 2010 onwards. The league previously allowed only female skaters to participate, but now affirms WFTDA's gender policy and states that membership is also open to "any other gender identities who most closely identify with women's flat track roller derby". Members of the league are drawn from many backgrounds, and include medical doctors, mothers, finance workers, electricians and tradies. The CRDL is considered the most professional league in the country.

The league is structured to protect the safety of its skaters, and new roller derby competitors advance through tiers. At each level, they learn and perfect specific derby skills, experience and general fitness, which helps to avoid injury and improve the quality of the competition. The time between joining and getting to compete in a bout is generally nine to twelve months. Skaters practice for roughly eight total hours a week, mostly during two weekly practices that last around three hours.

In April 2013, Canberra was accepted as a member of the Women's Flat Track Derby Association Apprentice Program, and graduated to full membership in October 2014.

== Squads ==
=== Vice City Rollers ===
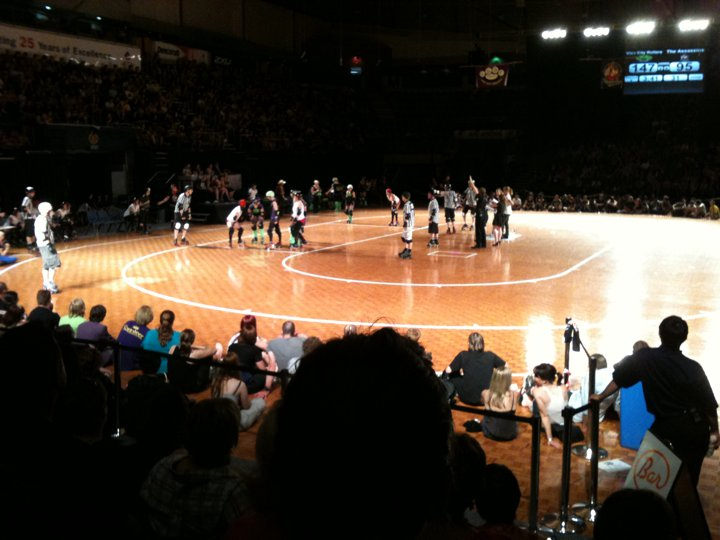
Canberra Roller Derby League interstate bout at AIS Arena against the Sydney Roller Derby League Assassins.

The all-star squad is composed of members of the teams of the Canberra Roller Derby League, who compete as a team in interstate bouts as the "Vice City Rollers". The name is a play on the fact that Canberra has a legal "adult" industry.

Women often don't get the opportunity to play a really aggressive sport. And it's a women's sport first. We have a great women's basketball team, but AFL and basketball, they're really all about guys. For me, I feel empowered because I've always had a fairly sizeable butt and for the first time in my life it's actually a total asset.

— Bambi von Smash'er

The Vice City Rollers competed in their first interstate bout in June 2010 in the Great Southern Slam hosted by Adelaide Roller Derby. They lost to Adelaide in the pool stage, but beat the Van Diemen Rollers; their record was insufficient for the team to advance to the quarter-finals.

In 2010, the team also played in bouts in Wollongong, Sydney and Melbourne. The October 2010 match in Sydney against the SydneyCity Assassins featured a Star Wars theme. On 11 December 2010, the Vice City Rollers competed against the Sydney Roller Derby League's all-star team, the Assassins, in a bout at AIS Arena billed as the "Lord of the Rink: The Two Towers", in their first home interstate bout. In the previous meeting in Sydney between the two teams, Canberra lost by four points. The 2010 squad members were managed by Anne Thrax and Belly Up. The captain was Bambi Von Smash'er, and the vice-captain was Dr Hell. Squad members included Amykazee, Faunacat, King Cam, Melicious Damage, Ova Bearing, Aunty Aggro, Cassatrophic, Dee Nature, The Dutachass, Pink Mist, Roulette Rouge and Short Stop.

The Vice City Rollers competed in several bouts in 2011, including a 19 March 2011 bout against the Victorian Roller Derby League (VRDL) All Stars, a 9 July bout against the NBR Brawl Stars of the Brisbane Roller Derby League in Brisbane, and a 9 August bout against the SSRG Fancy Pants at AIS Arena. They competed at the Eastern Region Roller Derby Tournament Finals on 1 and 2 October in Penrith, New South Wales, where they came in first place. When the Vice City Rollers played VRDL, Canberra lost to the current national champions, in front of a crowd of 3,500 spectators. In August the Vice City Rollers lost to the Sun State Roller Girls' Fancy Pants, the number two-ranked team in the nation at the time. Shaggle Frock was Canberra's leading jammer, scoring twenty of Canberra's forty-eight points. The Vice City Rollers are scheduled to have a 5 November 2011 bout in Geelong, Victoria against the Bloody Marys of the Geelong Roller Derby League.

The Roller Derby World Cup is the major international roller derby event, with nations sending representative teams, and Vice City Rollers Amykazee, Bambi von Smash'er, King Cam, and Short Stop were chosen for Team Australia for the 2011 edition.

In 2018, Canberra qualified for the WFTDA post-season for the first time, for the North American West Continental Cup held in Omaha, Nebraska in the United States. The Continental Cups model groups teams regionally by geography, and without sufficient numbers to hold a standalone tournament in the Asia Pacific region, Canberra was sent to Omaha. Canberra was the second seed at Omaha, and went unbeaten in capturing first place.

==== WFTDA rankings ====
| Season | Final ranking | Playoffs | Championship |
|---|---|---|---|
| 2015 | 129 WFTDA | DNQ | DNQ |
| 2016 | 137 WFTDA | DNQ | DNQ |
| 2017 | 71 WFTDA | DNQ | DNQ |
| 2018 | 22 WFTDA | 1 CC NA West | NA |

=== Black N Blue Belles ===
Canberra Roller Derby bout Brindabelters vs Black and Blue Belles at Southern Cross Stadium on 24 September 2011

The Black N Blue Belles were created in 2009. The team's name is a play on the ACT floral emblem, the Canberra Bluebell. The team is known inside the league for its fast skating and hard hits, and were the 2010 season champions. The team had eight new skaters in the 2011 squad, which was captained by ShortStop and Melicious Damage. The squad's 2011 sponsors include Allsports Mouthguards, and Cactus – Tattoo Artist North Lyneham.

=== Brindabelters ===
The Brindabelters were formed at the start of 2010 season. The team's name is a play on Brindabella Ranges, located in the ACT. The team had a number of new skaters join the competition squad for the 2011 season.

=== Red Bellied Black Hearts ===
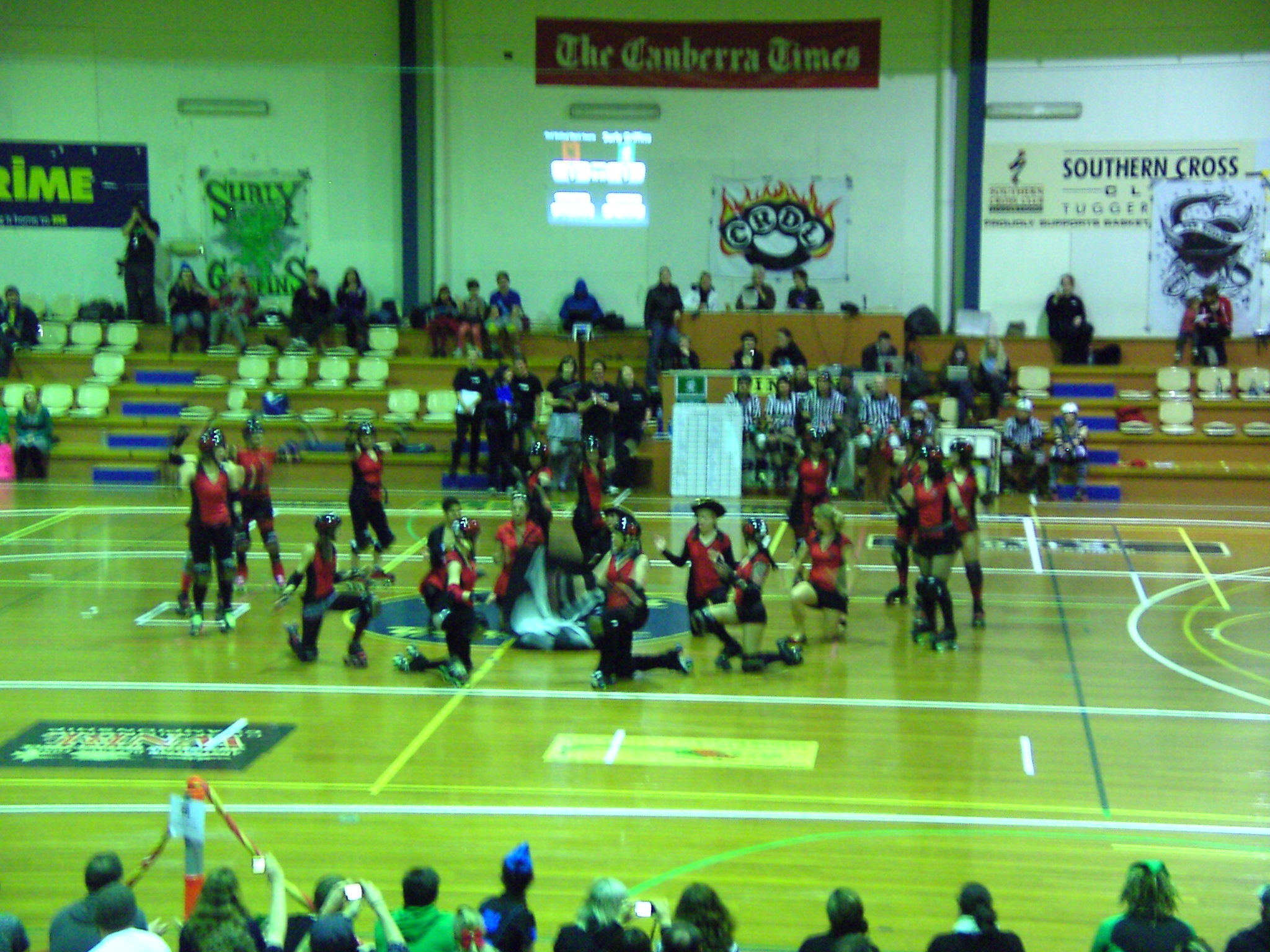
Red Bellies introduction

The Red Bellied Black Hearts were formed at the start of 2010 season. The name is a play on the name of a local snake, the Red-bellied Black Snake. The squad is known for their good looks and their willingness to pick fights. The 2011 squad was captained by Roulette Rouge. The Vice Captain was Bambi von Smash'er. The team had a number of new skaters join the competition squad for the 2011 bout season. The Red Bellied Black Hearts lost the opening bout of the 2011 season when they were defeated by the Surly Griffins.

=== Surly Griffins ===
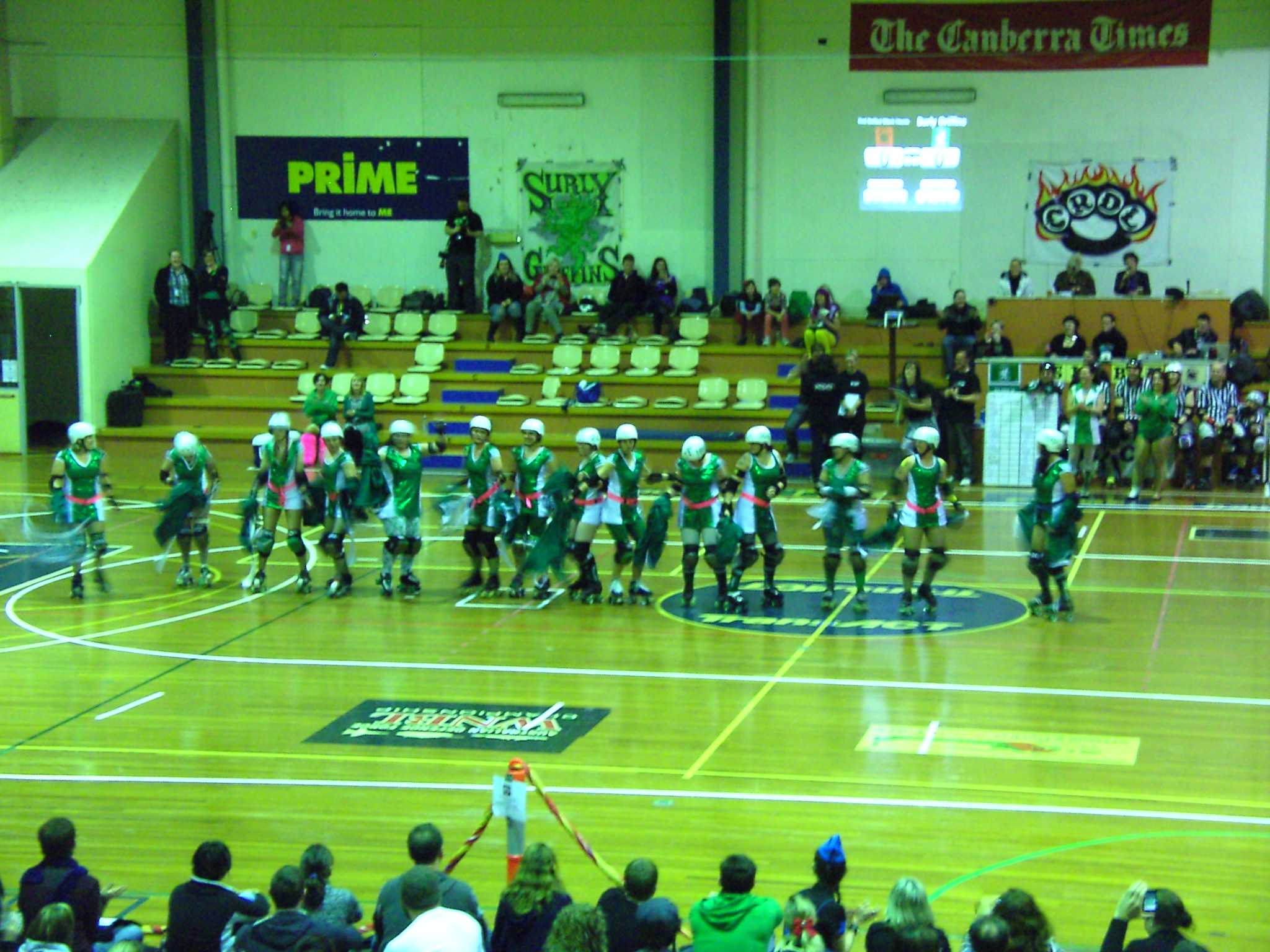
Surly Griffins introduction

I'll be barracking for the Surly Griffins whose proud sponsors are said to include (although I've not yet been able to confirm this) the fun-loving Canberra chapter of The Walter Burley Griffin Society. The team is called the Surly Griffins because, you see, roller derby bouts are all about sporty aggression and so every team of steely sheilas in the competition has a forbidding name.

— Ian Warden

The Surly Griffins were the 2009 season champions, and 2010 runners up in 2010. The team's name is a play on Walter Burley Griffin, who designed Canberra. Seven new skaters joined the 2011 squad, which was captained by Dr. Hell; the vice captains were Annethrax and Rainbow Spite. The team's sponsors for 2011 include Jake's Performance and CJ's Style. The Surly Griffins won their first bout in the 2011 season when they defeated the Red Bellied Black Hearts.

== Referees ==
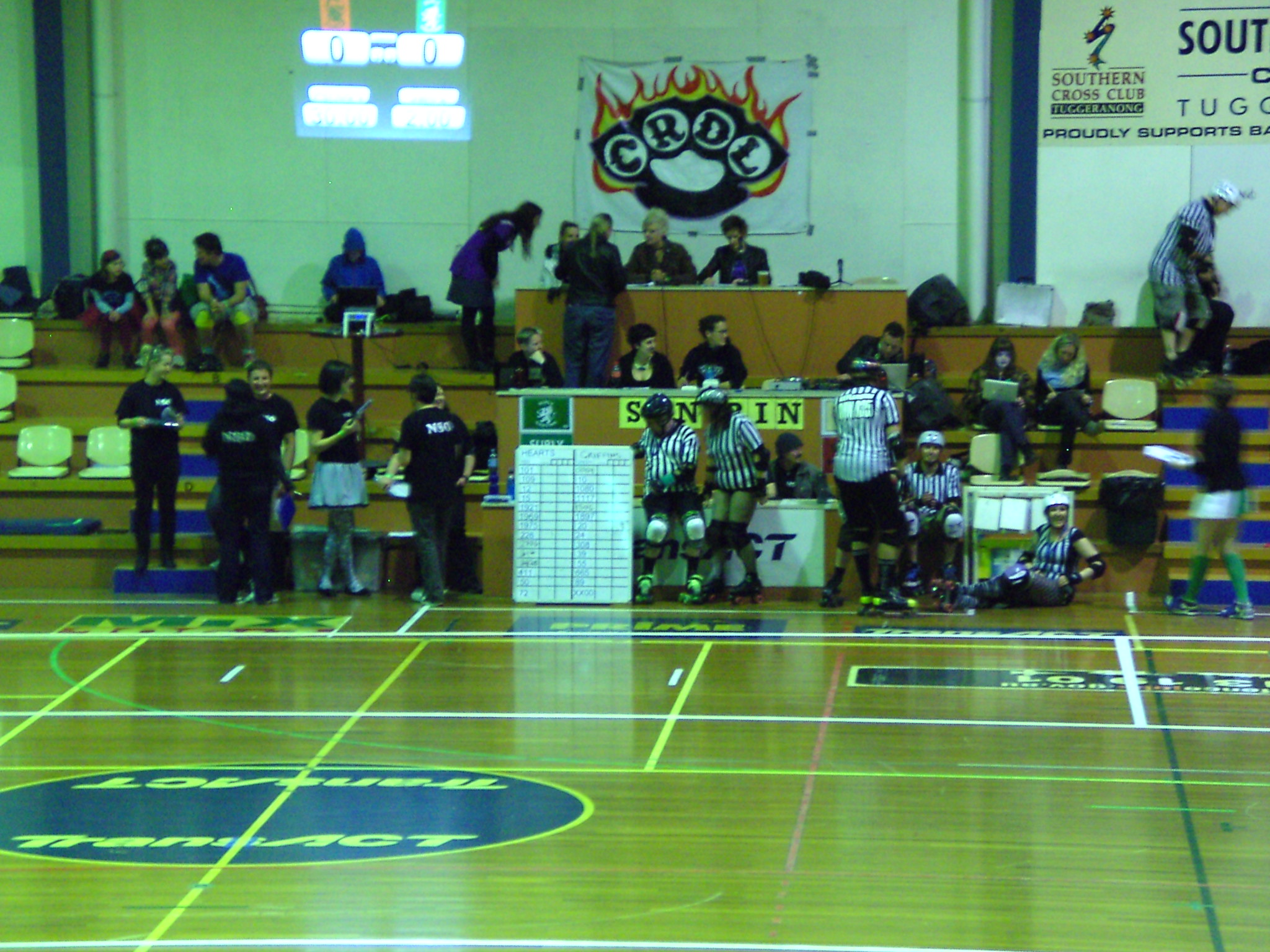
Zebra Team and NSOs (Non-Skating Officials)

The Canberra Roller Derby League has its own referee squad known as Team Zebra. For the 2011 season, the referees were Magic Strat, Refucious, J Ref. K, Fair-as Bueller, Sin Bin Laden, and Major Dyck. Canberra Roller Derby League referees have been involved with interstate bouts, and Refucious, John Ref Kennedy and Magic Strat were part of the squad that refereed the Sydney City Assassins versus Vice City Rollers bout on 12 December 2010. John Ref Kennedy, Fair-as Bueller and Major Dyck were part of the referee squad for the Vice City Rollers bout against the Sunstate Roller Girls Fancy Pants on 6 August 2011.

== Seasons ==
=== 2009 ===
There were only two teams in the league in 2009, the Black N Blue Belles and the Surly Griffins. At the start of the season, there were 20 skaters. The first public bout of the league's history had over 1,000 spectators in attendance and sold out within twenty-four hours of tickets going on sale. Including the finale, the season featured three bouts, the second of which were sold out within days. The Surly Griffins were the inaugural season Champions. The season's finale was played at the Southern Cross Stadium with tickets selling for A$10.

=== 2010 ===
The Canberra Roller Derby League had an intake more than 90 skaters at the start of the 2010 season during the Fresh Meat and Boot Camp intakes. The 2010 season saw the creation of two new teams, the Red Bellied Black Hearts and the Brindabelters. Canberra became only the second city and league in Australia to have four or more teams in their league when the teams were added at the start of the season, which kicked off on 11 September, with Brindabelters competing against The Black 'n' Blue Belles. The championship was held on 13 November 2010. The Black N Blue Belles were season champions in 2010, with the Surly Griffins as runners up. At bouts in 2010 and 2011, attendance was as high as 5,000 people per bout and the league had its own training venue. Tickets continued to sell out within 24 hours of going on sale during the 2010 season.

=== 2011 ===
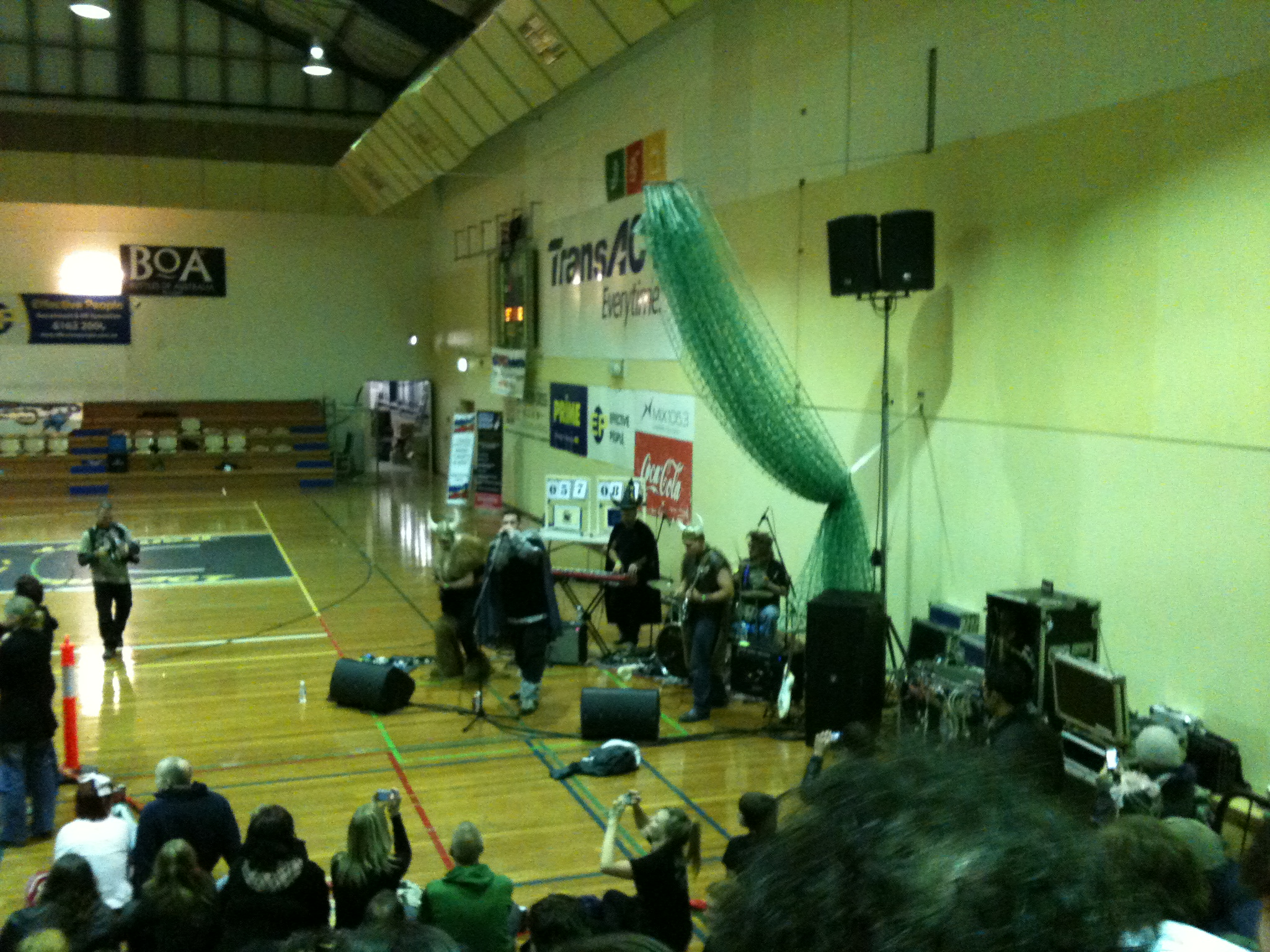
Knight-Hammer performing at intermission

Four hundred women signed up for the 2011 Fresh Meat intake, and many potential derby players were wait listed. The 2011 season had six scheduled bouts, all of which were held at the Southern Cross Stadium. The first was on 2 April when the Surly Griffins competed against the Black N Blue Belles (Griffins win). The second was on 20 April when the Red Bellied Black Hearts competed against the Brindabelters (Black Hearts win). The third was on 28 May when the Surly Griffins competed against the Brindabelters (Brindabelters win). The fourth was on 18 June when the Black Bellied Black Hearts competed against the Black N Blue Belles (Belles win). The fifth was on 27 August when the Red Bellied Black Hearts competed against the Surly Griffins (Black Hearts win). The sixth was on 24 September when the Brindabelters competed against the Black N Blue Belles. The 2011 Derby Darby Cup, dubbed Skate-Icus, was held on 22 October, and was a double header at AIS Arena featuring all four all teams. The Canberra Weekly Magazine ran a contest with prizes including entrance to the bouts and league related merchandise. The opening bout saw Surly Griffins compete against the Brindabelters for third place, the Griffins winning 142 to 130. The grand final bout pitted the Black n Blues and the Red Bellied Black Hearts. Teamwork, tactics and effective blocking eventually won a close bout for the Black Hearts, 138 to 134.

Abbreviation and Color Key: Black N Blue Belles - BNBB • Surly Griffins - SG Brindabelters - BL • Red Bellied Black Hearts - RBBH Win • Loss
| Team | Round | | | | | | | |
| Team | 1 | 2 | 3 | 4 | 5 | 6 | Finals | Refs |
|---|---|---|---|---|---|---|---|---|
| Black N Blue Belles | SG | Bye | Bye | RBBH | Bye | BL | RBBH | |
| Black N Blue Belles | 132-150 | Bye | Bye | 160-104 | Bye | 230-99 | 134-138 | |
| Surly Griffins | BNBB | Bye | BL | Bye | RBBH | Bye | BL | |
| Surly Griffins | 150-132 | Bye | 131-137 | Bye | 87-144 | Bye | 142-130 | |
| Brindabelters | Bye | RBBH | SG | Bye | Bye | BNBB | SG | |
| Brindabelters | Bye | 14-21 | 137-131 | Bye | Bye | 99-230 | 130-142 | |
| Red Bellied Black Hearts | Bye | BL | Bye | BNBB | SG | Bye | BNBB | |
| Red Bellied Black Hearts | Bye | 21-14 | Bye | 104-160 | 144-87 | Bye | 138-134 | |

The major sponsors for the 2011 season were Allsports Mouthguards, CJ's Style, Can Print, Jake's Performance, Bridges Canberra, Tattoo artist – North Lyneham, Impact Comics, Atlas Sports Physiotherapy, Stryking Signs, GXO, SkaterHQ, Elite Physique, Scope – Mount Stromlo, The Blue Olive, Fitsistas, and Jordo's Chop Shop. Bouts included live music being played during the half time intermission. Musical acts that performed during the season included Knight-Hammer, a medieval-Viking-lyrical themed-fusion 80s metal progressive parody band that wears Viking costumes while performing, and Mudpie Princess, a Canberra-based indie rock band. In 2011, the CDRL hosted official after parties after each league and interstate bout, which were held at the Hellenic Club in Tuggeranong.

=== 2012 ===
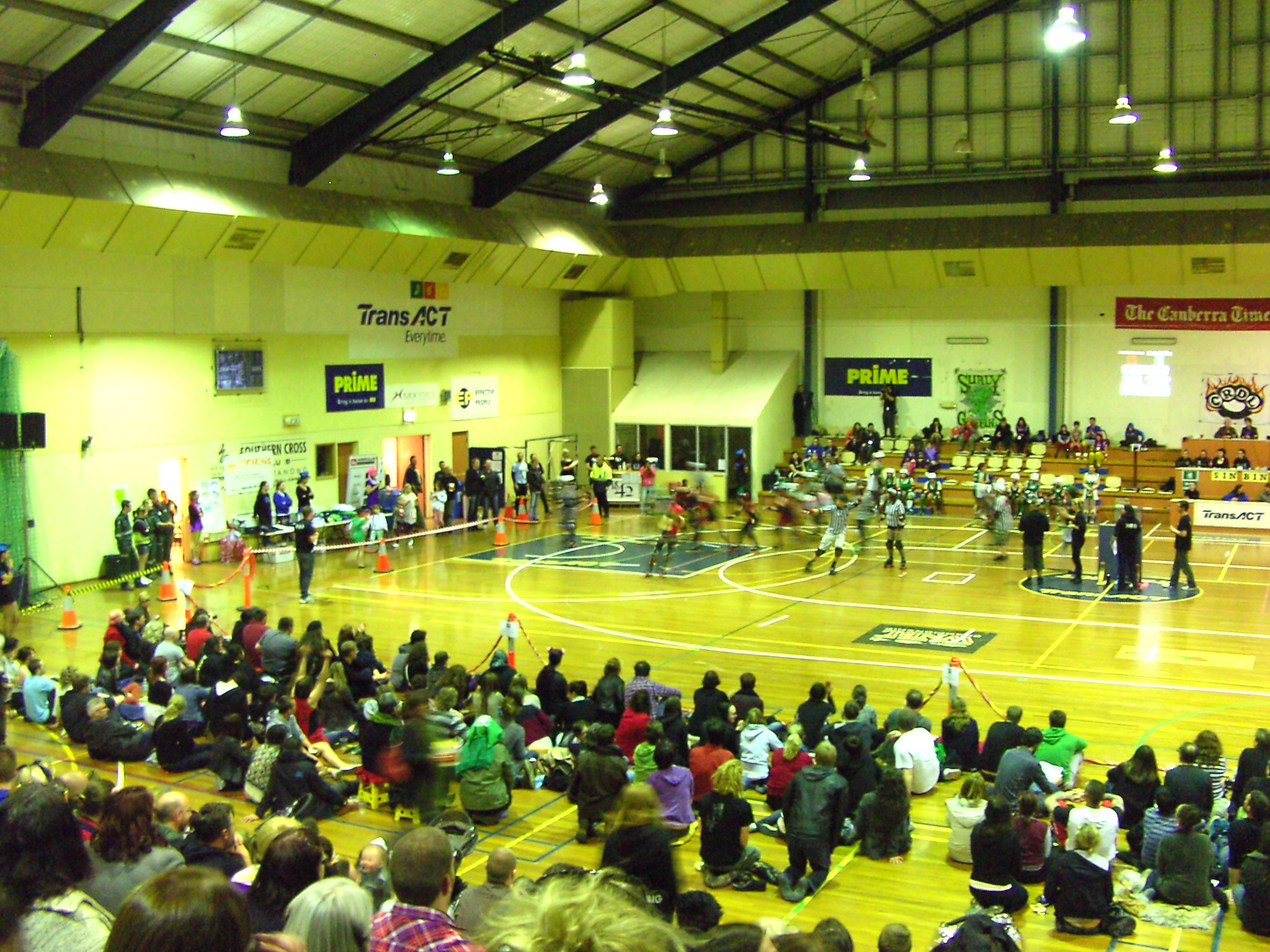
2012-09-08 match-up between Surly Griffins (winners) and Red Bellies.

The round on 8 September 2012 was won by the Surly Griffins over the Red Bellied Black Hearts. Half-time entertainment was by local rock group, "The London Circuit".

== Media ==
Bouts are filmed and are aired on television on Channelvision at a later date. ChannelVision also creates highlight films that appear on the network. 666 ABC Canberra sent journalists to a practice to cover and report on the league. In 2009, Bullseye Betty and Roulette Rouge joined Greg Bayliss in 666 ABC's studio to teach him how to block. The pair also discussed the Canberra Roller Derby League on his show. The league was one of several Australian based teams to appear in the movie, This Is Roller Derby.

== See also ==
- List of roller derby leagues
- Roller derby in Australia

| Preceded by event created | WFTDA Continental Cup North America West winners 2018 | Succeeded by incumbent |
