= Ballarat Roller Derby =

Roller derby league

- Metro area: Ballarat, Victoria
- Country: Australia
- Founded: 2008
- Teams: The Gold Diggers (Home); The Libertines (Home); Scarlet Vendettas (Home); The Gang Greens (Jr); The Purple People Beaters (Jr); Rat Pack (Travel) (B)Rat Pack (B Travel)
- Track type(s): Flat
- Venue: Doug Dean Reserve Stadium (Training)
- Website: https://www.ballaratrollerderby.com.au/

Ballarat Roller Derby (BRD) is a roller derby league based in the Victorian city of Ballarat. Founded in 2008, the league has three competitive co-ed home teams, two junior roller derby teams, an all-female away/travel team and a referee team.

== History ==
The Ballarat Roller Derby League was founded in June 2008, with the aim to have their first public bout by late 2009. In February 2009 they gained their first venue, and succeeded in hosting their first match in November of that year, The Derbytante Brawl. The two teams consisted of eight of their own skaters combined with members of the Geelong Roller Derby League. Their next public bout was in March 2011, when the BRDL appeared at the ChillOut Festival in Daylesford, Victoria – The Libertines reversing the outcome of their first match by defeating the Gold Diggers 189 points to 165. (Their appearance in Daylesford sparked interest in a league in the city, and thus the Daylesford Derby Dolls were formed, with the BRDL providing support and coaching in their initial stages).

After their appearance in Daylesford, the team competed in an interleague season with the Geelong Roller Derby League, fielding the "Rat Pack" with the Victorian Roller Derby League providing the players necessary to fill out their roster. Although unsuccessful in the five match series, this led up to their appearance at the Great Southern Slam hosted by Adelaide Roller Derby, the largest roller derby competition held outside of the United States. The "Maulrats", a combined team consisting of members of the BRDL and the Geelong league, finished sixth out of the 20 competitors.

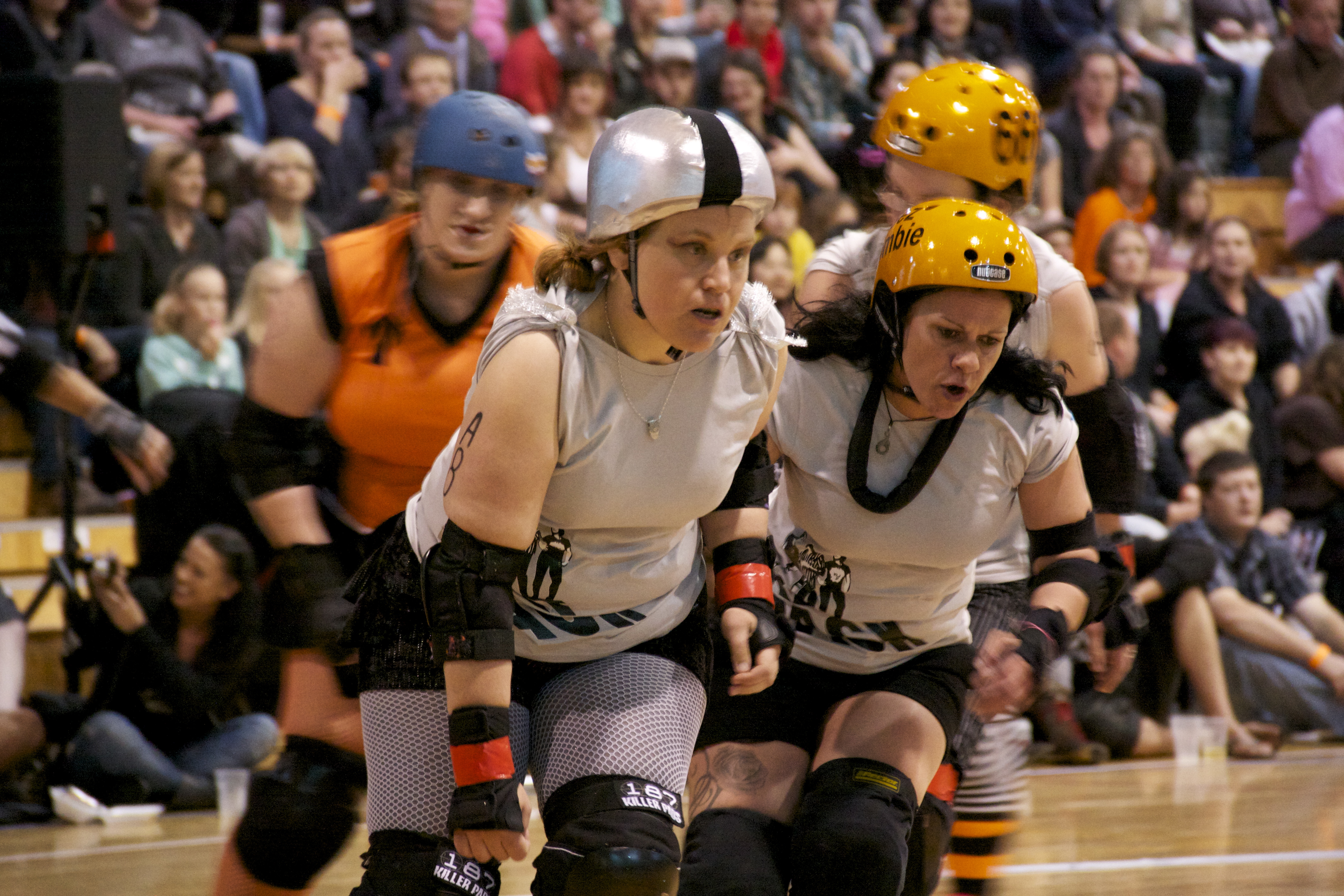
Ballarat take on Hobart's Convict City Rollers in November 2010.

Towards the end of 2010, the BRDL competed against the South Seas Sirens in the first match in which the Ballarat league was able to field a full team, losing out by 114 to 96. Their first interstate interleague bout was also held in November 2010, when the Rat Pack travelled to Tasmania to take on the Convict City Rollers. This proved to be the Ballarat team's first win, by a convincing 213 points to 56.

The formation of the Ballarat Roller Derby League was featured in the 2011 documentary film This is Roller Derby.

== See also ==
- List of roller derby leagues
