= Great Southern Slam =

Roller derby event in Adelaide, Australia

- 2010–present

Tournament information
- Location: Adelaide
- Month played: June
- Established: 2010
- Format: Group stage, knockout
- Website: greatsouthernslam.com.au

Current champion
- Victorian Roller Derby League

The Great Southern Slam (TGSS) is the largest competitive roller derby event in the world, contested by teams from New Zealand and Australia. It is held biennially in Adelaide in South Australia. TGSS was created and continues to be both hosted and run by volunteers from Adelaide Roller Derby. Initially held in 2010, it was the first flat track roller derby tournament to be held in the southern hemisphere.

== Format ==
The first round of the tournament sees teams divided into groups, which play on a round robin basis. Each group includes one of the most experienced teams from Australia or New Zealand, a middle-ranking team, and one less experienced team. The group winners and other teams with the highest point difference qualify for the quarter-finals, and the tournament then continues on a knockout basis. The 2012 tournament introduced additional bouts between twelve other teams, and some themed bouts with mixed teams, but these were separate from the main competition.

== 2010 tournament ==
The 2010 tournament included fifteen teams. Geelong and Ballarat formed a joint team, while Team Pot Luck included skaters from a number of otherwise unrepresented leagues. More than five hundred skaters were involved in the event.

Round one
Pool	Result			
A	Adelaide	165	42	Canberra
A	Canberra	137	63	Van Diemen
A	Adelaide	147	35	Van Diemen
B	Northern Brisbane	22	134	Victorian
B	Newcastle	45	155	Northern Brisbane
B	Newcastle	18	185	Victorian
C	Sun State	178	16	Wollongong
C	Townsville	91	81	Wollongong
C	Sun State	168	7	Townsville
D	Pirate City	145	30	Sydney
D	Sydney	166	31	Western Australia
D	Pirate City	197	25	Western Australia
E	Geelong-Ballarat	148	80	Perth
E	Perth	136	85	Pot Luck
E	Geelong-Ballarat	94	60	Pot Luck

Quarter finals
Adelaide	152	102	Geelong-Ballarat
Northern Brisbane	28	184	Sun State
Sydney	19	234	Victorian
Perth	51	207	Pirate City
Semi finals
Adelaide	60	124	Sun State
Pirate City	69	94	Victorian
Third place play-off
Adelaide	93	89	Pirate City
Final
Sun State	99	117	Victorian

== 2012 tournament ==
The 2012 tournament was held from 9–11 June. It expanded to eighteen teams, divided into six groups for the first round.

Round one
Group	Result			
A	Auckland	66	202	Victorian
A	Auckland	107	89	Newcastle
A	Newcastle	51	233	Victorian
B	Geelong	62	131	Sun State
B	Geelong	96	110	South Sea
B	South Sea	13	193	Sun State
C	Adelaide	125	72	Brisbane City
C	Brisbane City	180	78	Western Australia
C	Adelaide	118	78	Western Australia
D	Northern Brisbane	126	42	Pirate City
D	Northern Brisbane	229	35	Wollongong
D	Pirate City	168	103	Wollongong
E	Canberra	124	98	Perth
E	Gold Coast	130	125	Perth
E	Canberra	199	75	Gold Coast
F	Ballarat	79	155	Sydney
F	Ballarat	84	98	Convict City
F	Convict City	31	177	Sydney

Quarter finals
Canberra	53	310	Victorian
Adelaide	173	139	Brisbane City
Northern Brisbane	180	103	Pirate City
Sydney	54	195	Sun State
Semi finals
Adelaide	75	361	Victorian
Northern Brisbane	110	159	Sun State
Third place play-off
Adelaide	119	217	Northern Brisbane
Final
Sun State	115	198	Victorian

== 2014 Tournament ==
The 2014 TGSS was held at the Adelaide Showgrounds on 7-9 June 2014. The tournament was expanded again to 45 teams from Australia and New Zealand, playing in two divisions.

Division 1 Finals
Bout	Result			
Semi-final 1	Victorian	352	71	Sydney
Semi-final 2	Sun State	176	100	Vice City
3rd place play-off	Sydney	137	175	Vice City
Grand Final	Victorian	197	168	Sun State

Division 2 Finals
Bout	Result			
Semi-final 1	Western Sydney	192	240	South Side
Semi-final 2	Wollongong Illawarra	106	301	Reef City
3rd place play-off	Western Sydney	185	162	Wollongong Illawarra
Grand Final	South Side	140	225	Reef City

== 2016 Tournament ==
The 2016 TGSS was held from 11-13 June, with 45 teams again playing in two divisions.

Division 1
Pool	Result			
1	Reef City	12	764	Victorian
1	Reef City	204	125	Dragon City
1	Victorian	921	2	Dragon City
2	Sun State	409	69	South Sea
2	Sun State	422	59	Coastal Assassins
2	South Sea	286	152	Coastal Assassins
3	Sydney	267	106	Geelong
3	Geelong	151	153	Northside
3	Sydney	391	40	Northside
4	Perth	378	41	Varsity
4	Varsity	187	160	Northern Brisbane
4	Perth	352	66	Northern Brisbane
5	Canberra	459	29	Ballarat
5	Ballarat	90	239	Convict City
5	Canberra	527	61	Convict City
6	Adelaide	227	127	Western Australia
6	Western Australia	334	121	Whakatane
6	Adelaide	382	80	Whakatane
7	Brisbane City	367	67	The Bay Rollers
7	The Bay Rollers	159	213	Newcastle
7	Brisbane City	260	94	Newcastle

Division 1 Finals
Bout	Result			
Quarter-final 1	Sun State	366	87	Brisbane City
Quarter-final 2	Perth	84	204	Canberra
Quarter-final 3	Victorian	708	16	Western Australia
Quarter-final 4	Sydney	205	103	Adelaide
Semi-final 1	Sun State	128	146	Sydney
Semi-final 2	Victorian	471	18	Canberra
3rd place play-off	Canberra	103	217	Sun State
Grand Final	Victorian	561	15	Sydney

Division 2 Finals
Bout	Result			
Semi-final 1	West Side	134	146	Devil State
Semi-final 2	Diamond Valley	160	140	Inner West
3rd place play-off	West Side	142	105	Inner West
Grand Final	Devil State	66	234	Diamond Valley

== 2018 Tournament ==
The 2018 TGSS was held from 9-11 June, with 48 teams competing over three divisions. 2018 was the first year that a third division was added.

Finals Results
Division	Team	Score	Team	Score
1	Canberra Roller Derby	185	Victorian Roller Derby (B)	138
2	Victoria Roller Derby League (C)	205	Brisbane City Rollers	138
3	Westside Derby Dolls	137	South Sea Roller Derby	113

== 2020 Tournament ==
TGSS was planned to be held in 2020 from 6-8 June at the Adelaide Showgrounds but was cancelled due to COVID-19.

== 2022 Tournament ==
In 2022 TGSS was held from 11-13 June at the Adelaide Showgrounds. 30 teams competed across three divisions. It was the first roller derby tournament to be held globally since the beginning of the COVID-19 pandemic.

Division	Team	Score	Team	Score
1	Victoria Roller Derby League (A)	248	Adelaide Roller Derby (A)	66
2	Convict City Rollers	196	WestSide Roller Derby	101
3	Light City Derby	251	Nerdy Dragons	50

== 2024 Tournament ==
2024's TGSS was held at the Adelaide Showground and included 45 teams from Australia and New Zealand playing across 65 games over three divisions. Three additional challenge bouts were also played.

For the first time ever TGSS doubled as the WFTDA Oceania Regional Championships, which meant that the first and second place winners of Division 1 will earned a place in the 2024 WFTDA World Championships to be held in Portland, Oregon. Victorian Roller Derby and Adelaide Roller Derby were the first and second placed teams for the WFTDA Oceania Regional Championships.

Division	Team	Score	Team	Score
1	Victoria Roller Derby League (A)	302	Adelaide Roller Derby (A)	79
2	Brisbane City Rollers	166	WestSide Roller Derby	142
3	Kingston City Rollers	171	Dragon City Roller Derby	100
