= Perth Roller Derby =

Roller derby league based in Perth, Western Australia

- Metro area: Perth, Western Australia
- Country: Australia
- Founded: 2008
- Teams: West Coast Evils (A team); Rumble Bees (B team); The Galactic Storms; The Solar Flares; The Super Novas
- Track type: Flat
- Venue: Morley Rollerdrome
- Affiliations: WFTDA
- Website: www.perthrollerderby.com.au

Perth Roller Derby (PRD) is a women's flat track roller derby league based in Perth, Western Australia. Founded in 2008, the league is a member of the Women's Flat Track Derby Association (WFTDA).

== History ==
The league was formed in June 2008, and began bouting in mid-2009. By the end of 2010, it was selling out its 700-seat venue. Perth Roller Derby competed in the 2010 Great Southern Slam, where they reached the quarter-final before losing 207–51 to the Pirate City Rollers from Auckland. The league again entered the 2012 tournament, but narrowly lost both opening round bouts, to Gold Coast and the Canberra Roller Derby League.

In September 2013, Perth Roller Derby's representative teams both competed in the first statewide roller derby tournament, the Boom State Clash. The West Coast Evils played through the tournament undefeated, making it through to the grand final where they played fellow Perth league, WA Roller Derby. The West Coast Evils took out the win 305 - 98. The Rumble Bees fought hard and won one of their three games, taking out fifth place. In October 2013, Perth Roller Derby was accepted as a member of the Women's Flat Track Derby Association Apprentice Programme. In December 2014, Perth became a full member in the WFTDA.

As of 2016, Perth includes three home teams, The Galactic Storms (who wear green and black), The Solar Flares (red and white) and The Super Novas (purple and yellow) and two travel teams, the West Coast Evils and Rumble Bees (who both wear black or white with blue accents).

== WFTDA competition ==
Perth's travel team the West Coast Evils represents the league in WFDTA-sanctioned play. In 2018, the West Coast Evils participated at their first international tournament, taking first place at the 2018 Mayday Mayhem tournament in Loveland, Colorado.

In 2019 the league travelled to the WFTDA European Continental Cup in Helsinki, Finland. They finished the tournament in fourth place.

=== Rankings ===
Season	Final ranking	Playoffs	Championship
2015	149 WFTDA	DNQ	DNQ
2016	114 WFTDA	DNQ	DNQ
2017	106 WFTDA	DNQ	DNQ
2018	48 WFTDA	DNP	DNQ
2019	56 WFTDA		
2020	57 WFTDA		
2023	5 WFTDA		
2024	4 WFTDA		
2025	5 WFTDA		

- DNP = qualified but did not play
