= Brisbane City Rollers =

Roller derby league

- Metro area: Ipswich, Queensland
- Country: Australia
- Founded: 2009
- Teams: Punk Blockers (women's A team) Nasty Nancies (women's B team); Scartel (men's team); Violent Femmes (women intraleague/open season) Banshees (women intraleague/open season)
- Track type: Flat
- Venue: Ipswich Show Grounds
- Website: www.brisbanecityrollers.com

The Brisbane City Rollers (BCR) is a roller derby league based in Queensland, Australia. It consists of 3 women's intraleague teams, two women's travel teams and 1 men's travel team, which play against teams from other leagues. It is the oldest co-ed league in Australia.

The league was founded by a group of skaters, including "Evil Doll", who was a founding member of the Sun State Roller Girls. Initially based in central Brisbane, it relocated to Ipswich to find good practice facilities, and built up a following in the west of the city.

Two BCR skaters, Fang Fiend and Juke Nukem, were selected to skate for Team Australia at the 2010 Roller Derby World Cup.

The league took third place in the Tropicarnage Cup. At the 2012 Great Southern Slam, it reached the quarter-finals, where it lost 139 to 173 against Adelaide Roller Derby.
