= Western Australia Roller Derby =

Roller derby league

WA Roller Derby
- Metro area: Perth, Western Australia
- Country: Australia
- Founded: 2009
- Teams: WARDs of the Skate (A team); WayWARD Rollers (B team); Electric Screams; Sonic Doom; Atomic Sirens
- Track type(s): Flat
- Venue: Rolloways O'Connor, Rollerzone Malaga, The Rise, Maylands
- Affiliations: WFTDA
- Website: warollerderby.com.au

WARD Skaters during a 2011 bout.

WA Roller Derby (WARD) is a women's flat track roller derby league based in Perth, Western Australia. Founded in 2009, the league is a member of the Women's Flat Track Derby Association (WFTDA).

== History ==
WA Roller Derby was founded in August 2009 and held their first friends and family bout in May 2010.

WA Roller Derby's first public appearance was in Adelaide 2010, during the Great Southern Slam competition. Following this the first season saw three bouts between the home teams, Electric Screams and Sonic Doom at the Perth SpeedDome. WARD also coordinated the state’s first interleague bout which was held in Kalgoorlie.

WARDSs of the Skate, the representative A team, was formed in May 2011 to compete against Perth Roller Derby at Quads of War, Perth’s first ever inter-league event. In July 2011, WARD hosted WA's first ever interstate roller derby bout, against Melbourne-based South Sea Roller Derby.

In July 2012, WARD was accepted as a member of the Women's Flat Track Derby Association Apprentice Programme, and became a full WFTDA league in December 2014.

As of 2018, WARD have two home teams and one travel team.

== Participants ==
WARD allows admission of any able-bodied individual, regardless of their current skating skill level. "Freshmeat" members are taught basic skating skills (such as stable forwards skating and safe falling) before being assessed for their suitability to move on to more complex skills (such as full-contact Blocking). WARD is a women-only league; however other genders are welcome to join the Freshmeat training with a view to eventually joining the referee program and becoming part of "Team Zebra".

== Teams ==
WARD is currently the home of three teams: one travel teams and two home teams:

- WARDs Travel Team: formed in 2018 from the merger of WARD's A and B teams, they are the representative interleague team.
- Sonic Doom: formed in 2010, the 'Dooms' are one of two home teams. Their colours are blue and black.
- Atomic Sirens: formed in 2016, the 'Sirens' are one of two home teams. Their colours are red and grey.

=== Former teams ===
- WARDs of the Skate: formed in 2011, The WARDs of the Skate (or WotS) were the representative A team. They merged with the WayWARD Rollers in 2018.
- WayWARD Rollers: formed in 2012, the WayWARD Rollers were the representative B team. They merged with WARDs of the Skate in 2018.
- Electric Screams: formed in 2010, the 'Screams' were one of three home teams. Their colours were gold and white. The Electric Screams last played in 2016.

== WFTDA rankings ==
| Season | Final ranking | Playoffs | Championship |
|---|---|---|---|
| 2015 | 256 WFTDA | DNQ | DNQ |
| 2016 | 182 WFTDA | DNQ | DNQ |
| 2017 | 110 WFTDA | DNQ | DNQ |
| 2018 | 254 WFTDA | DNQ | DNQ |

== See also ==
- Sport in Western Australia
- Roller derby in Australia
