= Channelvision =

Australian television channel

- Country: Australia
- Broadcast area: Canberra

Programming
- Language(s): English
- Picture format: 576i (SDTV 16:9)

Ownership
- Owner: Independent

History
- Launched: 1 September 2005
- Closed: 2014

Channelvision was an Australian subscription television channel based in Canberra that screened locally produced content. The channel launched on 1 September 2005 on TransTV, replacing the TransTV Help Channel, and mainly broadcast local content, news, interviews and local sport.

Throughout its history, Channelvision only broadcast to Canberra via TransTV. However, on 5 July 2009, Channelvision began broadcasting a half hour magazine styled program on Aurora Community Channel, available nationally via subscription services Foxtel, Austar and Optus Television.
