= Skate Australia =

- Sport: Skate sports and skateboarding
- Jurisdiction: Australia
- Founded: 1962
- Headquarters: Brisbane
- Chairman: Phil Hamdorf

Official website
- www.skateaustralia.org.au
- (Australia)

Skate Australia is the recognised governing body for skate sports and skateboarding in Australia, working in partnership with Sport Australia. The body oversees the management and development of the sports from the national team at the elite level, the conduct of national and international events, through to grass roots participation.

== Governance ==
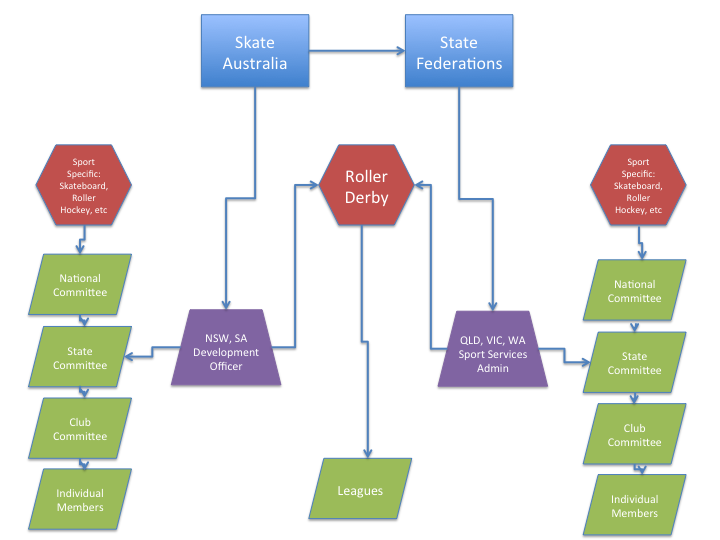
Chart showing governance of roller derby inside Skate Australia. Derived from information found on page 10 of Skate Australia's strategic plan.

Skate Australia provides a minimal level of insurance for some roller derby leagues in Australia. According to Skate Australia's 2009-2013 strategic plan, the governance of roller derby is different from other sports affiliated with the organisation. Roller derby lacks state committees, with leagues going straight to the Development Officer and Sport Services Administrator. In 2006, there were no roller derby members in Skate Australia. By 2008, three percent of all members were from the roller derby community.

== Funding and Support ==
Skate Australia is supported by Sport Australia.

== See also ==
- International Roller Sports Federation
- International Roller Sports Federation - Inline
- Roller derby in Australia
