= Geelong Roller Derby League =

Roller derby league

- Metro area: Geelong, Victoria
- Country: Australia
- Founded: 2008
- Teams: Atom Bombs; The Bloody Marys (combined team); The Psychotics
- Track type: Flat
- Venue: Bell Post Hill Leisuretime Centre
- Website: geelongrollerderby.com

Geelong Roller Derby (GRD) is a roller derby league based in the Victorian city of Geelong. Founded in 2008, the GRD has one team that competes and in interleague bouts. They support both men and women in the league, but their current competitive teams are women only.

== History ==
The Geelong Roller Derby League was founded in March 2008, and by 31 October of that year they were able to present their first bout. This first event was for family and friends only, and featured the Frankenskaters and the Bloody Marys – the latter of which was the origin of the name of their current interleague team. Their first public match was held just over a month later, on 6 December 2008, in which the Death Leopards competed against the Black Sadists.

The GRDL's first interleague bout was held the following year, in March 2009. They competed against the Victorian Roller Derby League's B team, "New Breed", followed by a rematch in May. The GRDL grew quickly, and by October that year they had over 40 members and were able to field two official teams: the Atom Bombs and the Psychotics. Their first full season was also held in 2009, taking place at Bell Post Hill Leisuretime Centre where they had relocated from their original venue, with the Psychotics dominating the series over the Atom Bombs.

2010 saw their second full season, in which the Atom Bombs reversed the results of the previous year, winning undefeated. 2010 also saw the Great Southern Slam hosted by Adelaide Roller Derby, the largest roller derby competition held outside of the United States. The "Maulrats", a combined team consisting of members of the Ballarat Roller Derby League and the GRDL, made it into the second day of the competition.

Recently, the Geelong Roller Derby League travel team, the Bloody Marys, took second place in the inaugural Vic/Tas Tournament, a two-state tournament featuring some 16 teams from each state, losing to the Victorian Roller Derby League's Queen Bees.

The Geelong Roller Derby League was featured in the 2012 documentary film This is Roller Derby (2012 film).

In October 2018, GRDL started its first junior team – The Junior Mary's.

== See also ==
- List of roller derby leagues
