= Convict City Roller Derby League =

Tasmanian roller derby league

Convict City Rollers
- Metro area: Hobart, Tasmania
- Country: Australia
- Founded: 2009
- Teams: Orange Thunder (A team); Black Lightning (B team); Convicted Panthers (Officials); Jail Birds; Wild Cats; Convict City Junior Rollers (Juniors) Former: The Convicts; Deadly Nightslays; Femmes Brutale
- Track type: Flat
- Venue: Aurora Sports Stadium, Clarence Sports Centre and Woody's Skate & Play
- Affiliations: WFTDA
- Org. type: Not for profit
- Website: http://www.convictcityrollers.org.au

Convict City Roller Derby League (CCR) is a women's flat track roller derby league based in Hobart, Tasmania. It was Tasmania's second league at its formation in 2009. Convict City is a member of the Women's Flat Track Derby Association (WFTDA).

== History ==
Convict City's first public bout, "Inaugural Brawl", came courtesy of Van Diemen Rollers in late 2010, where they were soundly defeated by the Diemens.

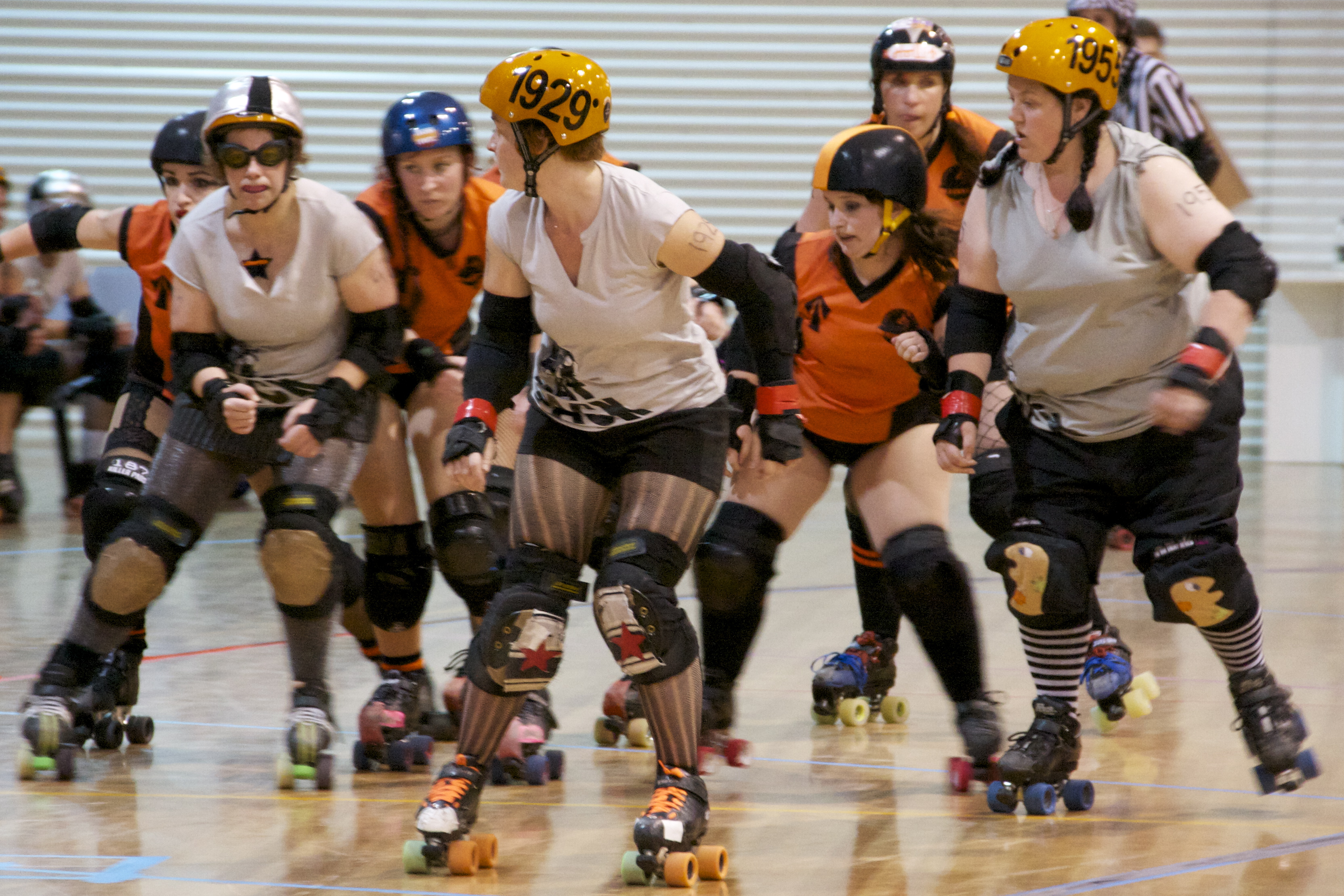
Ballarat's Rat Pack take on The Convicts in November 2010.

Convict City had their first interstate interleague bout in November 2010, when Ballarat Roller Derby League ("The Rat Pack") travelled to Tasmania to take them on. Ballarat won by a convincing 213 points to 56.

Convict City was the 2011 Tasmanian champion, winning the three-way tournament "Queens of the Skate Age" with Tasmania's two other Leagues, the South Island Sirens and Van Diemen Rollers. Convict City defeated Van Diemen to win the championship. The championship victory was Convict City's second-ever win; their first was the preliminary victory over South Island.

In September 2014, Convict City joined the WFTDA Apprentice Program, and was made a full member of the WFTDA in January 2016.

== WFTDA rankings ==
| Season | Final ranking | Playoffs | Championship |
|---|---|---|---|
| 2016 | 300 WFTDA | DNQ | DNQ |
| 2017 | 170 WFTDA | DNQ | DNQ |
| 2018 | 183 WFTDA | DNQ | DNQ |
| 2019 | 164 WFTDA | DNQ | DNQ |
| 2023 | 10 Oceania | DNQ | DNQ |
| 2024 | 14 Oceania | CR | DNQ |

- CR = consolation round
- no rankings 2020-2022 due to COVID-19 pandemic
- NPS = no European postseason due to COVID-19 pandemic
