= Northern Brisbane Rollers =

Roller derby league

- Metro area: Brisbane, Queensland
- Country: Australia
- Founded: 2008
- Teams: Brawl Stars (travel team); Diner Might Dolls; Love Rockettes; The Untouchabelles
- Track type: Flat
- Venue: Brisbane Convention & Exhibition Centre; South Pine Sports Complex
- Affiliations: WFTDA
- Org. type: not-for-profit
- Website: www.northernbrisbanerollers.com.au

The Northern Brisbane Rollers (NBR) is a women's flat track roller derby league based in Queensland, Australia. Founded in 2008, the league is a member of the Women's Flat Track Derby Association (WFTDA).

== History ==
The league was founded in 2008, and initially represented the Albany Creek area. Its first bout was held in April 2009, with early games attracting crowds of 500 to 600 people. By early 2010, the league moved many bouts to the Brisbane Convention & Exhibition Centre, in order to accommodate its growing number of supporters. This move proved successful and, by August, its bout against Gold Coast was expected to attract 5,000 fans.

Northern Brisbane has a longstanding rivalry with local opponents the Sun State Roller Girls, although Sun State have had the upper hand in contests. Among their meetings was the quarter-final of the 2010 Great Southern Slam tournament, which Northern Brisbane lost by 184 to 28. The league again reached the quarter-final of the 2012 Great Southern Slam, at which they beat Auckland's Pirate City Rollers 180 to 103, but it then lost in the semi-finals, again to Sun State, by 159 to 110.

In October 2013, Northern Brisbane was accepted as a member of the Women's Flat Track Derby Association Apprentice Programme. Northern Brisbane became a full member of the WFTDA in January 2016.

== WFTDA rankings ==
Season	Final ranking	Playoffs	Championship
2016	275 WFTDA	DNQ	DNQ
2017	181 WFTDA	DNQ	DNQ
2018	138 WFTDA	DNQ	DNQ
2019	359 WFTDA	DNQ	DNQ
2023	20 Oceania	DNQ	DNQ
2024	NR Oceania	DNQ	DNQ

- no WFTDA rankings from 2020-2022 due to COVID-19 pandemic
