= Victorian Roller Derby League =

Roller derby league

- Metro area: Melbourne, Victoria
- Country: Australia
- Founded: 2007
- Teams: Lightning / All Stars (International Team) Thunder (National Team) Storm (State Team) Victorian Junior Roller Derby (Juniors Team) Toxic Avengers (Home Team) Dead Ringer Rosies (Home Team)
- Track type: Flat
- Venue: The Factory VRDL
- Affiliations: Skate Australia WFTDA
- Org. type: NPO
- Website: https://www.vrdl.org.au

The Victorian Roller Derby League (VRDL or Victoria) is a flat track roller derby league based in Melbourne, Victoria. Founded in 2007, VRDL provides opportunities for all ages and at all levels to participate and compete in Roller Derby. VRDL is a member of the Women's Flat Track Derby Association (WFTDA), having gained membership in December 2011. In November 2017, VRDL became the first non-American team to win the WFTDA Championships. Since 2019, VRDL has been the second-ranked team in the WFTDA.

VRDL consists of three adult representative teams that compete in interleague competitions within Australia and internationally:

- VRDL All Stars / Lightning - the International representative team.
- VRDL Thunder - The National representative team (Thunder)
- VRDL Storm - The State representative team (Storm)

VRDL also has two Home Teams, the Toxic Avengers and Dead Ringer Rosies.

Alongside their adult teams, VRDL also runs Victorian Junior Roller Derby League, with both developmental and competitive training for junior skaters.

== History ==
Founded in March 2007, the Victorian Roller Derby League was started by Cherry Rockette (Mandar Nelson), Betty Bamalam, Toxic Judy, Denim Destructor (Chandelle Macklin) and Hidden Magenta. By the end of the year, the VRDL had 40 members, playing their first invite-only bout for friends and family at the Dandenong Showgrounds, and by 2009 the three teams were competing at 'Puckhandlers' in the suburb of Reservoir.

In 2008, the first interleague bout in Australia, "Skate of Origin", was held. The VRDL travelled to Adelaide to compete against Adelaide Roller Derby. The Victorians won at the end of a close bout. Other interleague bouts over the years have included "Skate of Origin 2" in Melbourne, where the Adelaide team defeated the Victorians; the Great Southern Slam in 2010, in which the VRDL won the largest roller derby competition that had been held outside of the United States; and the Canberra Roller Derby League at the AIS Arena in Canberra in 2011.

In 2010, bouts were moved to the Melbourne Showgrounds, and in 2011, the VRDL was both accepted into the WFTDA Apprentice program and gained a new training ground in Preston. The VRDL was the first league in Australia to be accepted into the WFTDA Apprentice program. In December 2011, they graduated from the Women's Flat Track Derby Association Apprentice program and became full members of the WFTDA - the first Australian member, as well as the first member league in the Southern Hemisphere at the time.

This created opportunities to compete in Europe and the United States. In 2011, the VRDL played their first international match against the Hotrod Honeys from the Texas Rollergirls, losing out to the more experienced side. In November 2011, the VRDL played their second international match against the Rat City All Stars from the Rat City Rollergirls, again losing to the more experienced team, but gaining a lot of skills in the process.

In 2012, the league expanded to four home teams and two levels of skater development within their recreational league. In April the travel team competed in their first international tournament in Tucson, Arizona. The Dust Devil Tournament is an invite-only event, which was then in its fifth year. The VRDL went into the tournament seeded tenth and ended in fifth place.

The league used to field four home teams: Dead Ringer Roses, Toxic Avengers, Rock Mobsters and Dolls of Hazzard. As of 2026, two of these teams still exist. The Dead Ringer Roses and the Toxic Avengers hold regular scrimmages at VRDL's Preston venue.

In 2022, Adelaide Roller Derby hosted The Great Southern Slam at the Adelaide Convention Centre. VRDL sent both teams Lightning and Thunder. Lightning made it to the grand final against Adelaide Roller Derby, winning the final 248-66 and placing 1st in Australia. Thunder won the game to place 3rd in Australia in a tight game against Brisbane City Rollers 137-135.

== In the community ==
The VRDL won the Women's Health magazine inaugural Women in Sport Award for best 'A' team of the year in August 2011, citing the general groundswell of support from the Australia-wide roller derby community for this people's choice award.

They contribute to the wider roller derby community in Australia by holding Master Classes and bootcamps on a regular basis, their coaches visit fledgling leagues all over Australia and are actively involved in the Australia Roller Derby Coalition (ARDC).

== WFTDA competition ==
The VRDL All-Stars represent the Victorian Roller Derby League in WFTDA competition. In July 2013, VRDL was ranked at 31, earning them their first appearance in a WFTDA Division 1 playoff tournament, held in Salem, Oregon September 27 through 29, 2013. VRDL entered the tournament as the eighth seed out of ten teams. This marked the first appearance in the WFTDA playoffs by an Australian and southern hemisphere-based league. With victories over the Chicago Outfit, Sacred City Derby Girls and Toronto Roller Derby, VRDL finished the tournament in fifth place.

At the 2017 Division 1 Playoff in Dallas, VRDL defeated Philly Roller Derby, Minnesota RollerGirls and Texas Rollergirls to finish in first place. The league continued to strengthen, and in 2017 won the WFTDA Championships, beating previous champions Rose City Rollers 180 to 101 in the final. VRDL jammer Samara "Lady Trample" Pepperell was named the tournament MVP. In 2018, VRDL received a bye directly to WFTDA Championships, by placing within the top four teams overall, as the first seed, in the 30 June rankings. At Championships in New Orleans in November, VRDL finished in second place, losing the final to Rose City in a rematch of the 2017 title game, 144-121.

In 2019, VRDL received another bye to move straight to the championships. VRDL won against Angel City Derby 169-88 to proceed to the semi-finals and was beaten by Gotham Roller Derby in a close match 109-103. VRDL then played for 3rd against Arch Rival Roller Derby and after a tight and competitive game, won with a score of 119-107.

=== Rankings ===
With the March 2017 WFTDA rankings release, VRDL was the top-ranked team in the WFTDA for the first time. VRDL has maintained a position in the top 3 since.

Season	Final ranking	Playoffs	Championship
2012	11 W	DNQ	DNQ
2013	21 WFTDA	5 D1	DNQ
2014	4 WFTDA	2 D1	QF D1
2015	2 WFTDA	1 D1	3 D1
2016	2 WFTDA	1 D1	3 D1
2017	1 WFTDA	1 D1	1 D1
2018	1 WFTDA	bye	2
2019	2 WFTDA	bye	3

- bye = received bye directly to WFTDA Championships

== See also ==
- List of roller derby leagues

Preceded by New tournament	Great Southern Slam Champions; 2010 – 2016	Succeeded by Current champions
Preceded by Rose City Rollers	WFTDA Championship winners 2017	Succeeded by Rose City Rollers
