= Adelaide Roller Derby =

Australian roller derby league

- Metro area: Adelaide, South Australia
- Country: Australia
- Founded: 2007
- Teams: Ads (combined team); Rads (combined team); Mile Die Club; Road Train Rollers; The Good Ship Salty (formerly known as The Salty Dolls); Wild Hearses; Team Zebra (Officiating Crew)
- Track type: Flat
- Venue: The Lights Recreation Centre
- Org. type: Not for Profit
- Website: http://adelaiderollerderby.com.au/

Adelaide Roller Derby (ADRD) is a roller derby league based in Adelaide, South Australia. Founded in 2007, the league has four competitive home teams; The Mile Die Club, The Good Ship Salty (formerly The Salty Dolls), The Road Train Rollers and The Wild Hearses, and an officiating 'Team Zebra'. There are also two combined representative teams, the "Ads" and the "Rads" that compete against other leagues and are currently ranked 3rd and 15th respectively in the Oceania region. Adelaide Roller Derby's home season is held at The Lights Recreation Centre, and the league is a member of the Women's Flat Track Derby Association (WFTDA).

Adelaide Roller Derby also host The Great Southern Slam biennially.

== History ==
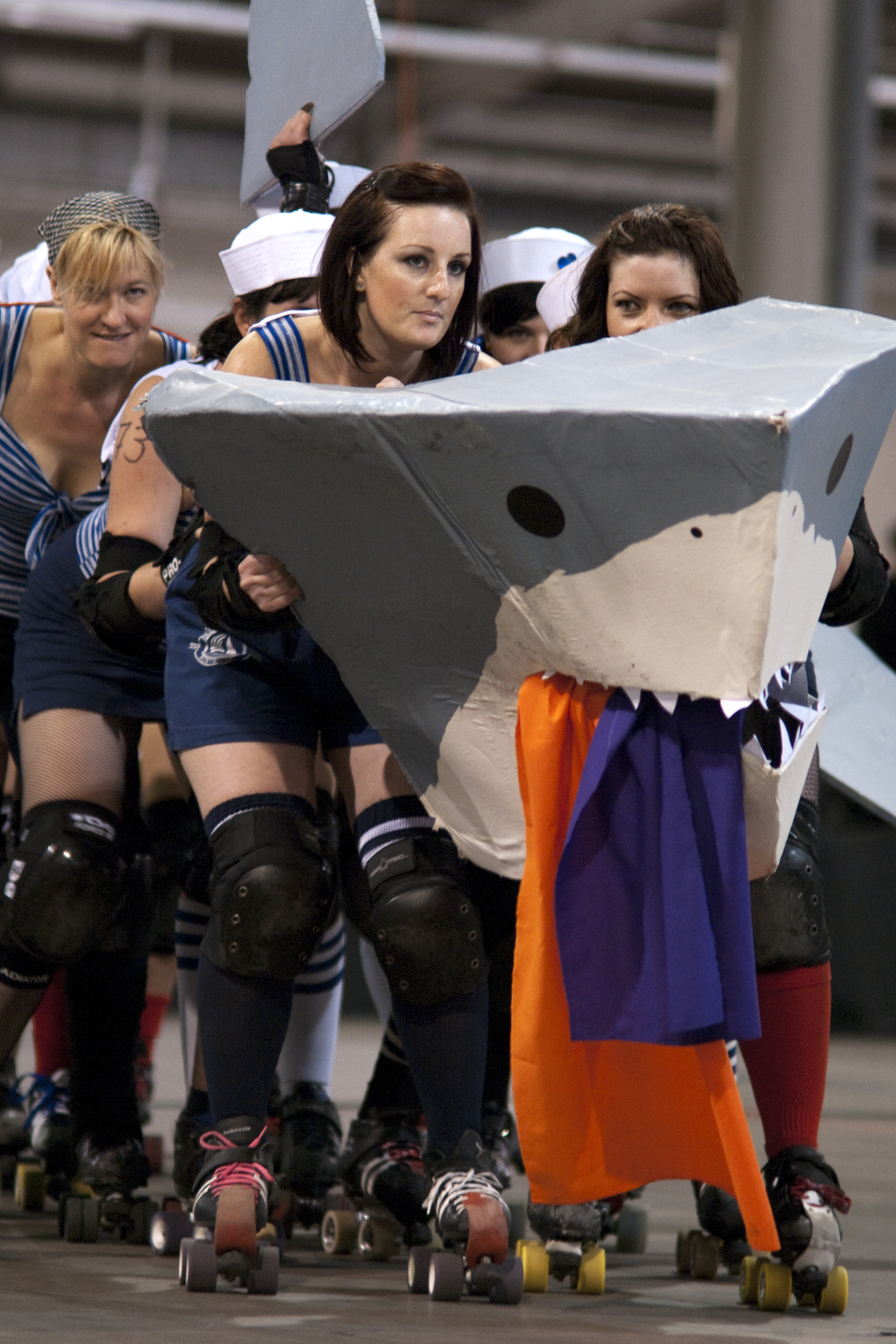
The Salty Dolls skate out at the Salty Dolls vs Wild Hearses match, 26 March 2011

Adelaide Roller Derby was founded in 2007, with their inaugural season launching in July 2008. Between the club's formation and the start of their first season, the club hosted the first interstate roller derby competition in Australia, Skate of Origin, against the Victorian Roller Derby League. Their first local competition started in 2008 and featured two teams, the Mile Die Club and the Salty Dolls, with the Salty Dolls winning the three-match series.

The second year of competition in the league saw the introduction of a new team, the Road Train Rollers, but it was the Mile Die Club who took out the series, winning undefeated. The same year also saw the second interstate bout between Adelaide and Melbourne. Skate of Origin 2 was hosted in Melbourne, but the Adelaidies were able to come out on top in a close match. This was followed by a three-state competition hosted in Adelaide between two Adelaide teams created for the event, the Phantoms and the Tornado, and teams from Brisbane and Sydney – the Brawl Stars and the Assassins. Once again, the two Adelaide teams were successful.

2010, the third year of competition for the Adelaide Roller Derby league, saw the introduction of a fourth team in the form of Wild Hearses. This brought the registrations for the league up to 120 per year, and 2010 saw over 100 people trying out for positions at the annual "Fresh Meat" program. The season started with an appearance leading the Adelaide Fringe parade, and ended in a double-header with a win to the Road Train Rollers. The same year saw Adelaide Roller Derby hosting the first Great Southern Slam – the largest roller derby tournament to be held outside of the United States, with 500 competitors from Australia and New Zealand.

In 2011 four teams competed over six bouts, with a double-header grand final won by the Salty Dolls. In addition to the local season, three interstate/international competitions were played. The first was with Bunbury and Perth teams at Arena Joondalup, followed by travelling to Newcastle to compete with the local league there, and finally a trip to New Zealand to compete against the Pirate City Rollers in Auckland.

Adelaide Roller Derby was featured in the documentary film This Is Roller Derby.

The league was accepted into the Women's Flat Track Derby Association Apprentice program on 24 January 2014. In March 2015, Adelaide was made a full member of the Women's Flat Track Derby Association .

=== Team Name Change ===
At the first double header of the 2022 season, The Salty Dolls were officially renamed "The Salties", the name change comes after several Non-Binary identifying players joined the league, in attempts to promote inclusion.

=== Death of Sarah Strong-Law ===
On 21 February 2022, the league founder Sarah Strong-Law (aka Barrelhouse Bessy) was killed in a car accident involving a truck on Kangaroo Island. The funeral was broadcast via Facebook Live and Zoom for people in Adelaide who couldn't travel or who were stuck in isolation due to COVID-19.

== WFTDA competition ==
In 2017, Adelaide was ranked at 23rd overall in the WFTDA, but was ineligible for Division 1 Playoffs for not meeting sanctioned game minimum requirements.

In 2019, Adelaide formally qualified for the WFTDA postseason for the first time, as the tenth seed for the North American West Continental Cup held in Orem, Utah in the United States. The Continental Cups model groups teams regionally by geography, and without sufficient numbers to hold a standalone tournament in the Asia Pacific region, Adelaide was sent to Utah. There they upset seventh-seeded Jet City Roller Derby in the opening round, before losing to Sun State Roller Derby in the quarterfinals, and ended the weekend with a consolation bracket win against Rocky Mountain Rollergirls.

Adelaide hosted the 2024 Oceania WFTDA Regional Championships at The Great Southern Slam tournament in Wayville, South Australia from 8-10 June 2024. The first and second place teams would be going to the global WFTDA Championships. Adelaide entered as the third seed and won their first game against Pirate City Rollers who entered as the sixth seed and had already won against Canberra Roller Derby League's Vice City Rollers. Adelaide's second game went similarly, winning against the second-seeded Brisbane Punk Blockers, upsetting Brisbane for the second-place spot with Adelaide securing a bid to the Championships.

=== WFTDA rankings ===
Season	Final ranking	Playoffs	Championship
2015	139 WFTDA	DNQ	DNQ
2016	165 WFTDA	DNQ	DNQ
2017	48 WFTDA	DNQ	DNQ
2018	68 WFTDA	DNQ	DNQ
2019	58 WFTDA	CR	DNQ
2023	4 Oceania	NPS	NPS
2024	3 Oceania	2	CR

- CR = consolation round
- no rankings 2020-2022 due to COVID-19 pandemic
- NPS = no postseason due to COVID-19 pandemic
