= Sydney Roller Derby League =

Roller derby league

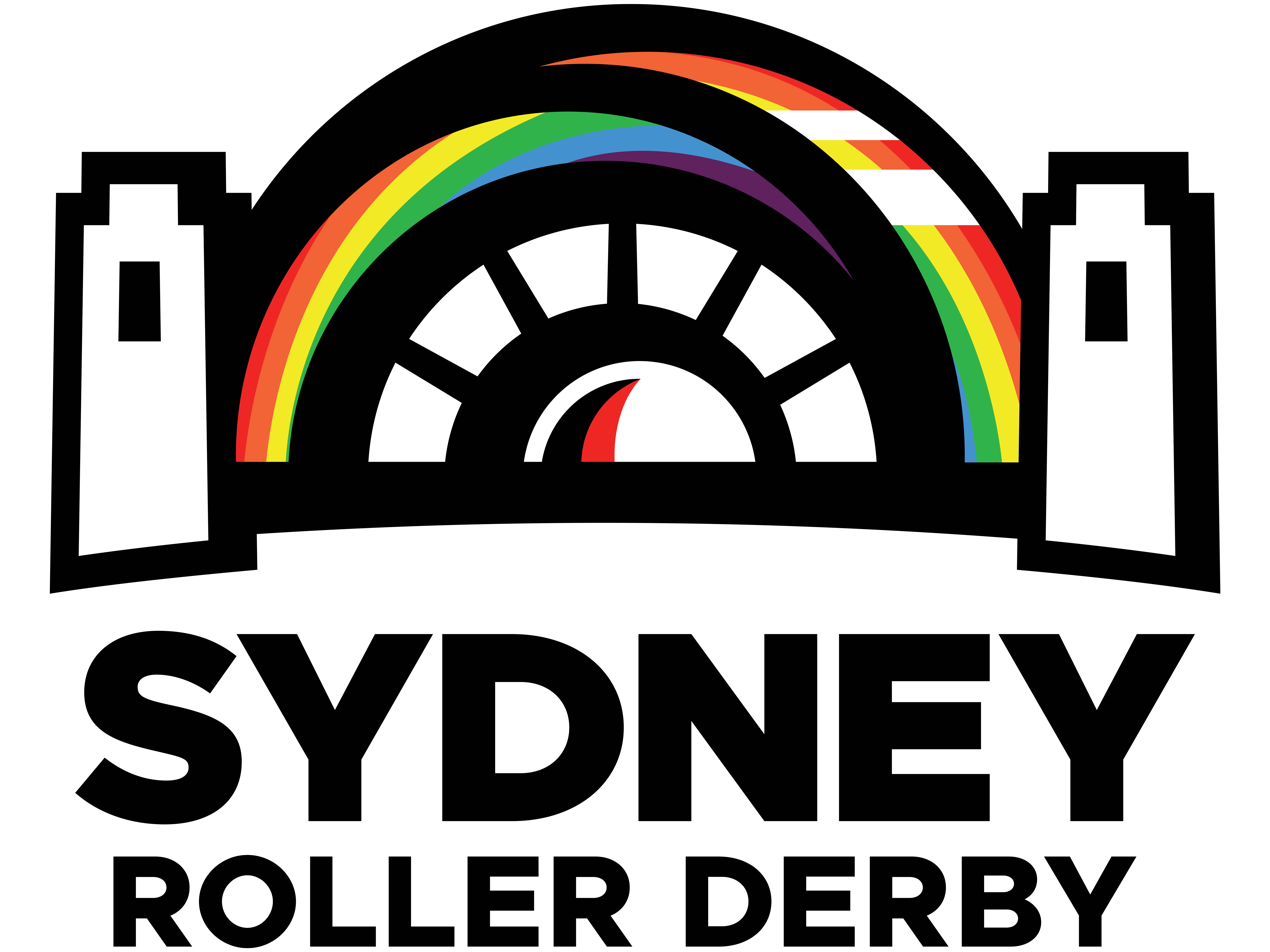
- Metro area: Sydney
- Country: Australia
- Founded: 2007
- Teams: Sydney Heat - WFTDA Charter Sydney Buzz - B Team Sydney O - Open Gender
- Track type: Flat
- Affiliations: WFTDA
- Website: sydneyrollerderby.com

Sydney Roller Derby League (SRDL) is a women's flat track roller derby league based in the New South Wales city of Sydney. Founded in 2007, Sydney is a member of the Women's Flat Track Derby Association (WFTDA).

== History ==
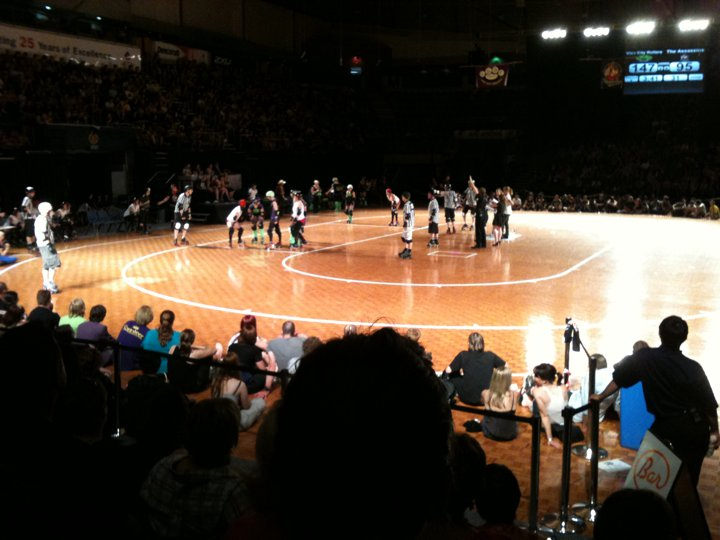
Canberra Roller Derby League interstate match at AIS Arena against the Sydney Roller Derby League Assassins.

Sydney Roller Derby League was established in late 2007, by a handful of women interested in creating a league in which to play roller derby. The league has been steadily growing ever since. It now has over 90 members.

Sydney Roller Derby League held its first full competitive season in 2009 with just two home teams, the Screaming Assault Sirens and the CBD'Viants, playing for the title of inaugural league champions. At the grand final some skaters from the Canberra Roller Derby League Canberra Roller Derby League were recruited as substitutes within the Screaming Assault Sirens as some players were out injured and one member of the Sirens was quarantined with possible swine flu.

In 2010, the representative side for the league competed against the representative side from the Canberra Roller Derby League.

On 11 December 2010, the Vice City Rollers competed against the Sydney Roller Derby League's all-star team, the Assassins, in a bout at AIS Arena billed as the "Lord of the Rink: The Two Towers". In the previous meeting in Sydney between the two teams, Canberra lost by four points.

In April 2013, Sydney was accepted as a member of the Women's Flat Track Derby Association Apprentice Program. Sydney became a full member of the WFTDA in December 2014.

== See also ==
- List of roller derby leagues
