= Men's Roller Derby World Cup =

International athletic tournament

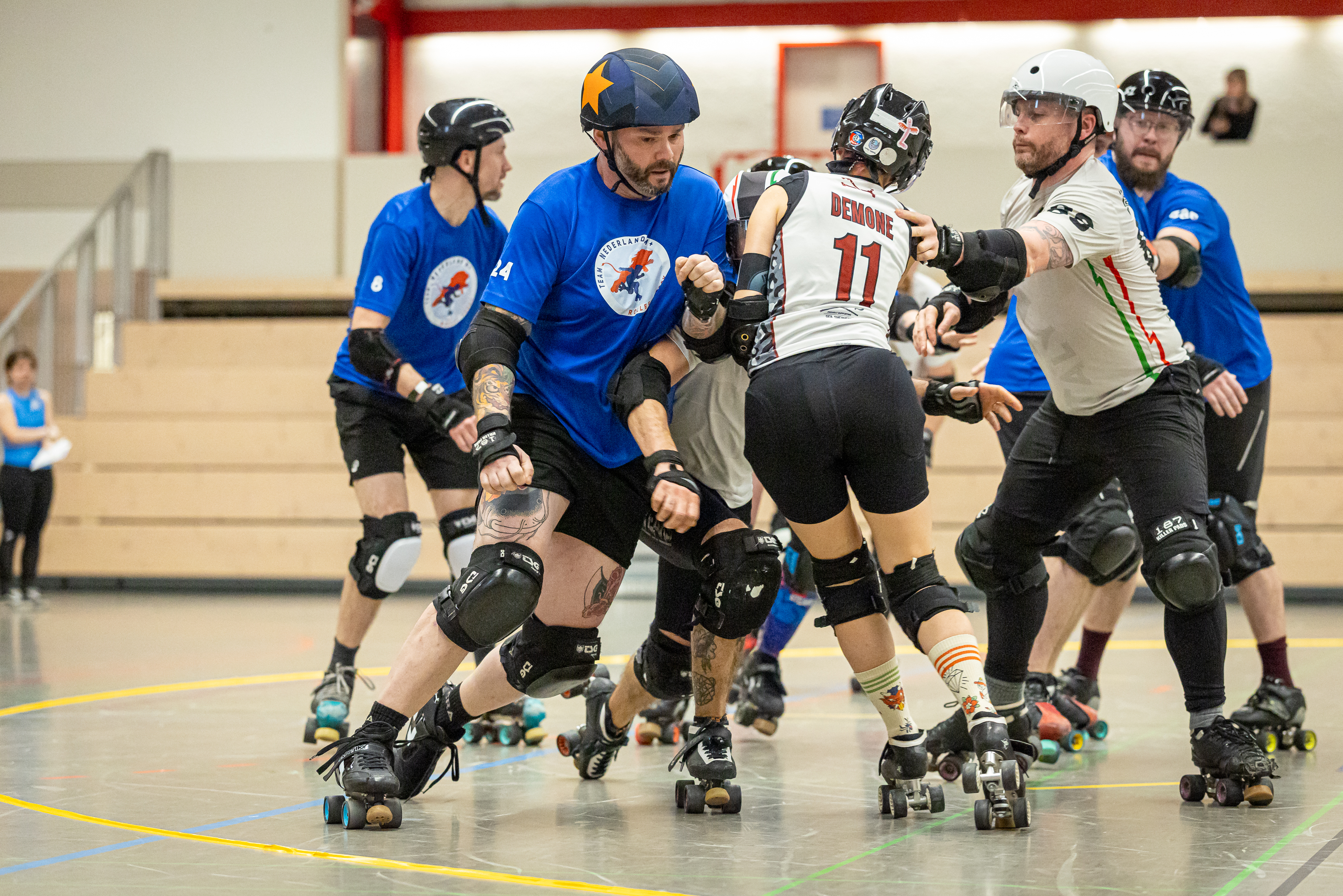
Men's Roller Derby - Team Italy and Team Nederland M+ Roller Derby during the Quail Clash preparation tournament for the 2026 Men's Roller Derby World Cup

The Men's Roller Derby World Cup is an international tournament in the sport of men's roller derby. The first World Cup was held between 14–16 March 2014 in Birmingham, England. The event has since been held in Calgary, Alberta, Canada in July 2016, and Barcelona, Spain on 5–8 April 2018

The tournament planned to be hosted in St. Louis, Missouri, USA on 9–12 July 2020 was cancelled, the next World Cup instead taking place in Orléans, France between 30 April and 3 May 2026.

The tournament is endorsed by the Men's Roller Derby Association (MRDA), and is held under the rules of Flat Track Roller Derby developed by the Women's Flat Track Derby Association, as used for all MRDA bouts.

== 2014 World Cup ==
Men's Roller Derby World Cup
- Host city: Birmingham
- Country: England
- Nations: 15 countries
- Dates: March 14, 2014– March 16, 2014
- Main venue: Futsal Arena
- Website: worldcup.mrda.org

=== Participating countries ===
Countries sending teams to compete in the 2014 Men's Roller Derby World Cup

Fifteen countries competed in the first tournament: Argentina, Australia, Belgium, Canada, England, Finland, France, Germany, Ireland, Japan, Netherlands, Scotland, Sweden, USA, and Wales. Two other teams, including New Zealand, applied to enter and received invitations, but withdrew before the tournament started.

Derby News Network described Team USA as "...clearly the hot favourites to win the World Cup", but noted that the European teams had the most competitive experience, having competed in the two Battle of the Beasts tournaments. Team USA beat Team England in the final by 260 points to 71.

Teams held tryouts during 2013 and could send a roster of up to twenty skaters. The participating countries were:

Country	Leagues sending skaters
Team Argentina	Buenos Aires Conspiracy, Harm City Homicide, Rayo Naranja, ThunderQuads Roller Derby
The Wizards of Aus [Australia]	Brisbane City Rollers, Light City Derby, Perth Men's Derby, Sydney City SMASH, Tasmania Men's Derby, Tweed Valley Rollers, Victorian Vanguard
Team Belgium	De Kevins, The Mons'ter Munch Derby Dudes
Team Canada	Glenmore Reservoir Dogs, Montreal Mont Royals, Ottawa Slaughter Squad, Red Deer Dreadnaughts, River City Riot, Vancouver Murder
Team England	Crash Test Brummies, Lincolnshire Rolling Thunder, Manchester Roller Derby, Southern Discomfort Roller Derby, The Inhuman League, Tyne and Fear
Team Finland	Tampere Rollin' Bros, Unaffiliated skaters
Team France	Brain Damage, Kamiquadz, Orcet, Panam Squad, Southern Discomfort Roller Derby, Toulouse Quad Guards, Zombeers
Team Germany	Delta Quads, Hot Outstanding Super Sailor Allstars, South German Men's Roller Derby
All-Ireland	Belfast Men's Roller Derby, Drive-by City Rollers, Dublin Capital Offence, Manchester Roller Derby, Pig Town Boys, Plymouth City Roller Girls, St. Louis GateKeepers, Southern Discomfort Roller Derby
Ninjapan Rollers (Japan)	Unaffiliated skaters (ex-Roller Games)
Team Netherlands	Amsterdam Derby Dames, Arnhem Airbomb Rollers, Breda Suckcity Rollers, Crash Test Brummies, Eastside RocknRollers, Eindhoven Bruisers, Groningen Roaring Thunder, Heerlen Pink Peril, Karlsruhe RockArollers, Lincolnshire Rolling Thunder, Rotterdam Death Row Honeys
Power of Scotland	Bairn City Rollers, Capital City Roller Derby, Granite City Brawlermen, Mean City Roller Derby, Milton Keynes Roller Derby, Tyne and Fear, The Jakey Bites
Team Sweden	Gothenburg Salty Seamen, Luleå, Malmö Royals, Västerås
Team USA	Cincinnati Battering Rams, Dallas Deception, Magic City Misfits, Mass Maelstrom Roller Derby, New York Shock Exchange, Puget Sound Outcasts, St. Louis GateKeepers, Your Mom Men's Derby
Team Wales	Milton Keynes Roller Derby, Southern Discomfort Roller Derby, South Wales Silures

=== Results ===
==== Semi-finals ====
16 March 2014	England	227-112	France
16 March 2014		(84-47)

16 March 2014	USA	307-127	Canada
16 March 2014		(207-43)

==== Final ====
16 March 2014	USA	260-71	England
16 March 2014		(159-39)

=== Final rankings (2014) ===
The final rankings released after the Men's Roller Derby World Cup 2014 are as follows:

Rank	Team
1st	Team USA
2nd	Team England
3rd	Team Canada
4th	Team France
5th	Wizards of Aus
6th	Team Wales
=7th	Power of Scotland
=7th	Team Argentina
9th	Team Finland
10th	All-Ireland
=11th	Team Netherlands
=11th	Team Germany
13th	Team Belgium
14th	Team Sweden
15th	Ninjapan Rollers

== 2016 World Cup ==
In 2015 The organisers of the Men's Roller Derby World Cup announced that the next World Cup would be held in July 2016, in Calgary, Alberta, Canada.

=== Final rankings (2016) ===
The final rankings released after the Men's Roller Derby World Cup 2016 are as follows:

Rank	Team
1st	USA
2nd	England
3rd	Australia
4th	Canada
5th	France
6th	Argentina
7th	Wales
8th	Finland
9th	Mexico
10th	Scotland
11th	Sweden
12th	Belgium
13th	Ireland
14th	Germany
15th	Italy
16th	Puerto Rico
17th	Japan
18th	Chile
19th	Spain
20th	The Netherlands

== 2018 World Cup ==
24 nations took part in the 2018 MRDWC in Barcelona Spain, up by 4 teams from 2016.

=== Final rankings (2018) ===
Rank	Team
1st	USA
2nd	England
3rd	Australia
4th	France
5th	Canada
6th	Mexico
7th	Argentina
8th	Wales
9th	Scotland
10th	Finland
11th	Belgium
12th	Spain
13th	Sweden
14th	Ireland
15th	Germany
16th	The Netherlands
17th	Chile
18th	Italy
19th	Japan
20th	New Zealand
21st	Colombia
22nd	Denmark
23rd	Philippines
24th	Poland

== 2026 World Cup ==
The 2026 World Cup took place in Orléans, France between 30 April and 3 May 2026. Host nation Team France secured their first World Cup title, defeating the three-time defending champions, Team USA, in the final.

=== Results ===
==== Championship Bracket ====
Round	Team 1	Score	Team 2
Quarter-finals	France	372–85	Belgium
Quarter-finals	England	243–69	Mexico
Quarter-finals	Canada	138–215	Argentina
Quarter-finals	USA	333–55	Australia
Semi-finals	France	188–146	England
Semi-finals	Argentina	76–317	USA
Grand Final	(gold) France	230–137	USA (silver)

==== Classification Bouts ====
Match	Team 1	Score	Team 2
3rd Place Play-off	(bronze) England	270–84	Argentina
5th Place Play-off	Australia	127–121	Mexico
7th Place Play-off	Belgium	181–116	Canada
9th Place Play-off	Italy	216–122	Wales
11th Place Play-off	Colombia	323–108	Netherlands
13th Place Play-off	Chile	396–68	Kalmar Union
15th Place Play-off	Germany	204–202	Schmear Campaign
17th Place Play-off	Spain	188–60	New Zealand
19th Place Play-off	Scotland	243–128	Ireland

=== Final rankings (2026) ===
Rank	Team
(gold) 1st	France
(silver) 2nd	USA
(bronze) 3rd	England
4th	Argentina
5th	Australia
6th	Mexico
7th	Belgium
8th	Canada
9th	Italy
10th	Wales
11th	Colombia
12th	Netherlands
13th	Chile
14th	Kalmar Union
15th	Germany
16th	Schmear Campaign
17th	Spain
18th	New Zealand
19th	Scotland
20th	Ireland
