= Wisconsin United Roller Derby =

Roller derby league

- Metro area: Madison, Wisconsin; Milwaukee, Wisconsin
- Country: United States
- Founded: 2009
- Teams: Travel Team; Wisconsin United Roller Derby; Wisconsin Men's Roller Derby (retired); Milwaukee Blitzdkrieg (retired); Home Teams; Great Lakes Pirates (retired); Half Barrel Heroes (retired); Mad Men (retired)
- Track type: Flat
- Venue: Rollaero Skate Center; Fast Forward Skate Center; Alliant Energy Center
- Affiliations: MRDA
- Org. type: 501(c)(3) NPO
- Website: www.wisconsinunitedrollerderby.com

Wisconsin United Roller Derby (WURD) is an all-gender flat-track roller derby league based in Madison, Wisconsin. The league was originally formed in Milwaukee, Wisconsin, in 2009 as the first all-men's league in Wisconsin and previously used the names Milwaukee Schlitzkrieg, Milwaukee Blitzdkrieg, and Wisconsin Men's Roller Derby before rebranding as Wisconsin United Roller Derby in August 2019.

== History ==
In May 2009, a few Milwaukee skaters, the core of what would become the Milwaukee Schlitzkrieg, the first men's roller derby team in Wisconsin, traveled to Duluth, near the Minnesota border, for a mixer event with the Twin Cities Terrors.

== Milwaukee Blitzdkrieg ==
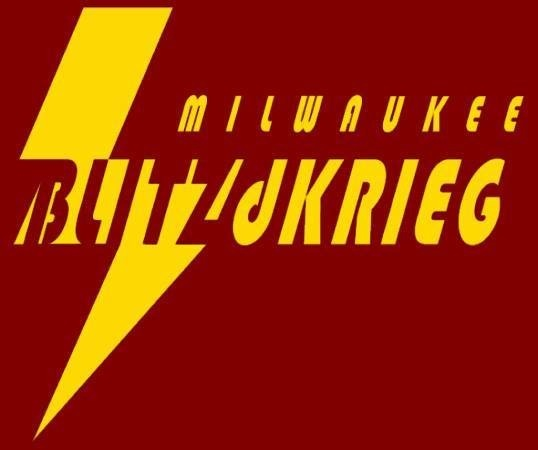

In June 2010, copyright issues necessitated a name change, and the Blitzdkrieg was born. Thanks to the Paper Valley Roller Girls hosting a double-header event, the team was able to play its first full game, having performed only in expo games until that point. The Terrors once again travelled to play, taking another victory over the Blitzdkrieg in Appleton, Wisconsin.

The next two years were a long, slow, uphill battle. The team faced challenges in finding practice space, recruiting new members, training, and gaining exposure. But hard work and perseverance began to pay off, as new members came through the door and the city started to take notice. New strategies were tested, modified, and sometimes discarded, training plans developed, and the team traveled extensively throughout the Midwest, learning from mistakes and continually growing stronger.

December 2012 was a turning point, as the team’s application to the Men's Roller Derby Association (MRDA) was unanimously approved by the member leagues, officially making the Blitzdkrieg a nationally ranked team. By the end of 2013 they were ranked 29 in the MRDA 2013 End of Season Rankings.

In January 2014, for the first time, the Blitzdkrieg had built up the numbers to form two home teams, Half Barrel Heroes and Great Lakes Pirates. This gave the team the ability to more easily produce events, and allows more skating time for all players, furthering their development.

== Wisconsin Men's Roller Derby ==
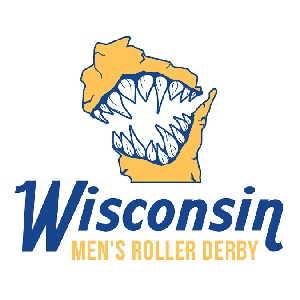

In 2016, the Blitzdkrieg were joined by a new group of skaters in Madison, WI known locally as Mad Men Roller Derby and decided to rebrand as Wisconsin Men's Roller Derby (WMRD). The league played as Wisconsin Men's Roller Derby for the 2017 and 2018 MRDA seasons. At the conclusion of the 2018 season, several key players decided to retire from roller derby and the league chose to go on hiatus from MRDA. The league remained active and played a series of non-sanctioned bouts in 2019 to focus on rebuilding and gaining experience.

== Wisconsin United Roller Derby ==
In the summer of 2019, the league decided to change its name to better recognize the contributions of women and non-binary members.

== Media ==
2018
March 11, 2018: Mad Men were featured in an article in the Wisconsin State Journal.
2014
March 7, 2014: Milwaukee Blitzdkrieg were interviewed live by Chip Brewster of the Fox 6 morning show, Real Milwaukee.

March 18, 2014: Milwaukee Blitzdkrieg were featured in an article on OnMilwaukee.com

April 25, 2014: A bit of a history on the Milwaukee Blitzdkrieg in Express Milwaukee.com.

2011
January 4, 2011: Milwaukee Blitzdkrieg members were interviewed for the Milwaukee Journal Sentinel.

== Home teams ==
Great Lakes Pirates

Half Barrel Heroes

In 2014, for the first time, home teams were established - the Great Lakes Pirates and the Half Barrel Heroes. On March 29, 2014 the Milwaukee Blitzdkrieg held their first ever home team bout. The Great Lakes Pirates took the first win, with a score of 338-101 over the Half Barrel Heroes.

Date	Great Lakes Pirates	Half Barrel Heroes
2015
Feb 28	110	202
Apr 11	161	163
May 09	321	66
2014
Mar 29	338	101
Apr 27	258	202
May 17	288	157

== Charter team ==
2016 Roster (as of Feb 17, 2016)
Alter-Nate	8
Bombsquad	0x0
Brad the Impaler	100K
D-Rek	50
Father Trucker	00
Havok	82
Hijack	82
Kingpin	65
Lemme Adam	6
Montezuma	4K
Mr. Burns	235
Mr. Mojo	911
Nik Shenanigans	556
Rufhouse Wainwright	12
Shock N Austin	1101
Sir Racha	110F
The Bloody Bearon	B33R
Vegabond	94

== Interleague seasons ==
Date	Opponent	Tournament	Sanction	Blitzdkrieg/WMRD/WURD	Opposing Team
2026
Sep 26	Skunk River Riot (ARDA)		n/a	92	210
Jun 6	Quad City Rollers (B-team)		n/a	150	147
2025
Sep 13	Midwest Maidens Roller Derby		n/a	65	338
Aug 2	Barbed Wire Roller Derby		n/a	213	134
Jul 20	Terminus Roller Derby	Roller Derby Tournament	n/a	193	307
Jul 20	Terminus Roller Derby	Roller Derby Tournament	MRDA	0 (forfeit)	100
Jul 19	Cleveland Guardians	Roller Derby Tournament	MRDA	29	345
Jul 19	Detroit Riot	Roller Derby Tournament	MRDA	55	311
Apr 19	Peoria Prowlers		n/a	145	115
Mar 1	Brewcity Bruisers Battlestars		n/a	108	233
2024
Nov 23	MRD Team Unicorn		n/a	212	218
Aug 24	Midwest Magic		n/a	264	108
Jun 29	Cedar Rapids RollerGirls		n/a	216	130
May 18	Skunk River Riot (ARDA)		n/a	114	187
Mar 16	MRD Team Unicorn		n/a	228	325
2020
Feb 8	CFDD Muncie Missfits		n/a	331	97
2019
Nov 9	Skunk River Riot (ARDA)		n/a	189	164
Oct 12	Barbed Wire Betties		n/a	136	193
Sep 28	Omaha Roller Derby		n/a	148	205
Jun 22	Cedar Rapids RollerGirls		n/a	265	92
Apr 7	Chicago Bruise Brothers B-Team	Udder Chaos 2019	n/a	87	357
Mar 16	St. Louis B-Keepers		n/a	13	358
Mar 16	Twin Cities Terrors		n/a	19	483
2018
Jul 21	Chicago Bruise Brothers		MRDA	81	246
Jun 3	Lane County Concussion	2018 Midwest BrewHaHa	MRDA	120	208
Jun 2	Chicago Bruise Brothers	2018 Midwest BrewHaHa	MRDA	222	228
Jun 1	Houston Men's Roller Derby	2018 Midwest BrewHaHa	MRDA	246	171
May 19	Twin City Terrors	Udder Chaos 2018	MRDA	120	220
Feb 10	Brewcity Bruisers Battlestars		n/a	311	149
2017
Jul 23	Dakota Men's Roller Derby	Rolling Along The River	MRDA	222	137
Jul 22	Chicago Bruise Brothers	Rolling Along The River	MRDA	226	113
May 20	Race City Rebels		MRDA	39	350
May 20	Twin City Terrors		MRDA	97	337
Apr 15	Chicago Bruise Brothers		MRDA	166	153
2016
Jun 25	Chicago Bruise Brothers		MRDA	125	192
Jun 5	Golden State Heat	2016 Midwest BrewHaHa	MRDA	155	216
Jun 4	Twin City Terrors	2016 Midwest BrewHaHa	MRDA	119	215
Jun 3	Dakota Men's Roller Derby	2016 Midwest BrewHaHa	MRDA	121	270
Mar 19	Chicago Bruise Brothers		MRDA	247	142
Jan 9	FCRD: Valley Vixens		n/a	257	121
2015
Jun 28	Tulsa Derby Militia	Midwest DerbyFest	MRDA	128	262
Jun 28	Tampa Bay Men's Roller Derby	Midwest DerbyFest	MRDA	113	239
Jun 27	Harm City Roller Derby	Midwest DerbyFest	MRDA	292	92
Jun 26	St. Louis B-Keepers	Midwest DerbyFest		129	262
Jun 20	Mad Rollin' Dolls			160	279
Jun 7	BisMan Bomberz	Midwest BrewHaHa	MRDA	186	318
Jun 6	Cleveland Guardians	Midwest BrewHaHa		393	94
Jun 5	Capital City Hooligans	Midwest BrewHaHa	MRDA	136	244
May 23	Chicago Bruise Brothers		MRDA	141	243
Apr 28	Quad Squad			178	235
2014
Aug 30	Rock City Riot		MRDA	85	270
Aug 30	BisMan Bomberz		MRDA	88	178
Jul 19	Chicago Bruise Brothers		MRDA	279	77
Jun 29	OCK Wolf Pack	Midwest DerbyFest		137	163
Jun 29	Cowtown Butchers	Midwest DerbyFest		110	68
Jun 29	Capital City Hooligans	Midwest DerbyFest		103	45
Jun 27	Tulsa Derby Militia	Midwest DerbyFest	MRDA	188	214
Jun 01	Twin Cities Terrors	Midwest BrewHaHa	MRDA	113	318
May 31	Dallas Deception	Midwest BrewHaHa	MRDA	125	429
May 30	Chicago Bruise Brothers	Midwest BrewHaHa	MRDA	259	127
2013
Aug 24	Big O Roller Bros			88	253
Aug 24	Cincinnati Battering Rams			166	180
Jul 20	Green Bay Smackers	Border Battle	MRDA	170	117
Jul 20	Twin Cities Terror	Border Battle	MRDA	116	235
Jun 22	Green Bay Smackers		MRDA	246	99
May 19	Carolina Wreckingballs	2013 Spring Roll	MRDA	93	218
May 19	Your Mom Men's Derby	2013 Spring Roll	MRDA	23	447
May 17	Harm City Roller Derby	2013 Spring Roll	MRDA	67	327
Apr 14	Sioux City Korn Stalkers		MRDA	229	242
Mar 23	Chicago Bruise Brothers			325	180
Feb 23	Cincinnati Battering Rams			255	310
2012
Sep 1	Sioux City Korn Stalkers	Rolling Along the River		164	182
Sep 1	St Louis GateKeepers B-Keepers	Rolling Along the River		61	284
Aug 11	Green Bay Smackers			92	174
Jun 23	Rock City Riot			60	222
Jun 16	Race City Rebels			29	311
2011
Dec 3	Twin City Terrors			164	138
Mar 20	Twin City Terrors			65	198
2010
Oct 23	Race City Rebels	Rolling Along the River		23	155
Oct 23	Rock City Riot	Rolling Along the River		21	125
Oct 23	Twin City Terrors	Rolling Along the River		29	117
Jun 26	Twin City Terrors			22	127

Stats provided by Flat Track Stats

== MRDA rankings ==
Season	Ranking	Championship
2013	29	DNQ
2014	24	DNQ
2015	27	DNQ
2016		
2017	35	DNQ
2018	31	DNQ
2019	hiatus	DNQ
2023	unranked	N/A
2024	unranked	DNQ
