= Australia national men's roller derby team =

The Wizards of AUS
- Founded: 2013
- Colours: Green, Gold
- Head coach: Tui Lyon & Crack
- Championships: 3rd Place at Men's Roller Derby World Cup 2016 5th Place at Men's Roller Derby World Cup 2014
- Website: www.wizardsofaus.com.au

The Wizards of AUS represent Australia in men's international roller derby. First formed in August 2013, the team was originally intended as a warm-up for the Men's Roller Derby World Cup (Birmingham, England 4 to 6 March 2014), in which they competed against the New Zealand Black Skates.

== World Cup 2016 ==
On 18 March 2016 the Wizards of AUS named their seventeen-man squad that would be travelling to Calgary in July 2016 to compete in the Men's Roller Derby World Cup. (skaters' league affiliations as of the time of the announcement) The Wizards of AUS is in the Blue group and are rostered to play pool games on Thursday 21 July and Friday 22rd. On the Thursday the Wizards of AUS will play Belgium at 9:00am, Netherlands at 2:00pm, and Puerto Rico 6:00pm. On the Friday they will play France at 3:00pm before moving onto the knockout stage.

Number	Name	League
16	Ballistic Whistle	Southern Discomfort Roller Derby
173	Copter	Varsity Derby League
34	Dirty5	Victoria Men's Roller Derby (Sports Team)
80	Flamin' Galah	Victoria Men's Roller Derby (Sports Team)
3	Fuzz	Denver Ground Control
90	Greese Monkey	Sydney City SMASH
39	JS	Victoria Men's Roller Derby (Sports Team)
75	Justin Credible	Victoria Men's Roller Derby (Sports Team)
89	Kernel Panic	Sydney City SMASH
1957	Mr Spew	Sydney City SMASH
311	RAMPAGE	Sydney City SMASH
11	Sausarge Rolls	Bass Strait Brawlers
1261	Skateslinger	Varsity Derby League
0	Skate Pilgrim	Victoria Men's Roller Derby (Sports Team)
505	Son Of Skatin'	Victoria Men's Roller Derby (Sports Team)
633	Synaptic Kid	Brisbane City Rollers
42	Thorsome	Bass Strait Brawlers

=== Coaching staff ===
- Tui Lyon - Bench Coach
- Crack - Lineup Manager

=== Captains ===
- Mr Spew
- Sausarge Rolls

=== MRDWC 2016 ===
The Wizards of AUS started the tournament in Blue Group in which they ranked First and drew Wales national men's roller derby team in the Semifinal.

Playoff game one - Australia 210 def Belgium 31

Playoff game two - Australia 342 def Netherlands 3

Playoff game three - Australia 309 def Puerto Rico 10

Playoff game Four- Australia 79 def France 70

Semifinal - Australia 359 def Wales national men's roller derby team 96

Quarter Final - United States 356 def Australia 89

3rd place playoff - Australia 243 def Canada 174

Australia finished the tournament in 3rd place.

== 2016 World Cup Warm Up games ==
On 9 July 2016 the Wizards of AUS had a rematch with the Victorian Roller Derby League All Stars in Victoria (Australia). Victoria defeated the Wizards 199 to 164. The following skaters competed in the public game.

Number	Name	League
173	Copter	Varsity Derby League
34	Dirty5	Victoria Men's Roller Derby (Sports Team)
BC	Flamin' Galah	Victoria Men's Roller Derby (Sports Team)
3	Fuzz	Mountain States Cutthroat Mafia
90	Greese Monkey	Sydney City SMASH
39	JS	Victoria Men's Roller Derby (Sports Team)
75	Justin Credible	Victoria Men's Roller Derby (Sports Team)
89	Kernel Panic	Sydney City SMASH
1957	Mr Spew	Sydney City SMASH
311	RAMPAGE	Sydney City SMASH
11	Sausarge Rolls	Bass Strait Brawlers
1261	Skateslinger	Varsity Derby League
0	Skate Pilgrim	Victoria Men's Roller Derby (Sports Team)
505	Son Of Skatin'	Victoria Men's Roller Derby (Sports Team)
633	Synaptic Kid	Brisbane City Rollers
42	Thorsome	Bass Strait Brawlers
LM	Crack	Convict City Roller Derby League

On 2 April 2016 the Wizards of AUS played the Victorian Roller Derby League All Stars in Victoria (Australia). Victoria defeated the Wizards 248 to 181. The following skaters competed in the public game.

Number	Name	League
173	Copter	Varsity Derby League
80	Flamin' Galah	Victoria Men's Roller Derby (Sports Team)
90	Greese Monkey	Sydney City SMASH
39	JS	Victoria Men's Roller Derby (Sports Team)
75	Justin Credible	Victoria Men's Roller Derby (Sports Team)
89	Kernel Panic	Sydney City SMASH
1957	Mr Spew	Sydney City SMASH
311	RAMPAGE	Sydney City SMASH
11	Sausarge Rolls (C)	Bass Strait Brawlers
1261	Skateslinger	Varsity Derby League
505	Son Of Skatin'	Victoria Men's Roller Derby (Sports Team)
633	Synaptic Kid	Brisbane City Rollers
LM	Crack	Convict City Roller Derby League

== 2015/16 Training Squad ==
Try outs for the current team roster were held on 28 February and 7 March 2015, in Melbourne. As of 13 March 2015, the 2015/2016 training team for the Calgary Men's Roller Derby World Cup 2016 is: (skaters' league affiliations as of the time of the announcement)

Number	Name	League
5	Arsenal	Brisbane City Rollers
16	Ballistic Whistle	Southern Discomfort Roller Derby
1701	Captain Smirk	Bass Strait Brawlers
173	Copter	Varsity Derby League
34	Dirty5	Bass Strait Brawlers
80	Flamin' Galah	Victoria Men's Roller Derby (Sports Team)
3	Fuzz	Brisbane City Rollers
90	Greese Monkey	Bass Strait Brawlers
39	JS	Victoria Men's Roller Derby (Sports Team)
75	Justin Credible	Victoria Men's Roller Derby (Sports Team)
89	Kernel Panic	Sydney City SMASH
1957	Mr Spew	Sydney City SMASH
8	Oliver Sudden	Perth Men's Derby
51	Pretty Skate Machine	Victoria Men's Roller Derby (Sports Team)
696	Private Parts	Victoria Men's Roller Derby (Sports Team)
22	Quadfather	Sydney City SMASH
311	RAMPAGE	Sydney City SMASH
11	Sausarge Rolls	Bass Strait Brawlers
79	Shirley	Brisbane City Rollers
1261	Skateslinger	Varsity Derby League
0	Skate Pilgrim	Victoria Men's Roller Derby (Sports Team)
505	Son Of Skatin'	Victoria Men's Roller Derby (Sports Team)
925	Sparkle	Perth Men's Derby
633	Synaptic Kid	Tweed Valley Rollers
42	Thorsome	Bass Strait Brawlers
27	Ya Mum	Sydney City SMASH

=== Coaching staff ===
- Tui Lyon - Bench Coach
- Crack - Lineup Manager

=== Captains ===
- Mr Spew
- Sausarge Rolls

== World Cup 2014 and Power of Scotland Friendly Roster ==
On 14 December 2013 the Men's Roller Derby World Cup 2014 was announced. (skaters' league affiliations as of the time of the announcement)

Number	Name	League
57	Ass N Junk	Sydney City SMASH
77	Bohemian Slapcity	Sydney City SMASH
173	Copter	Brisbane City Rollers
80	Flamin' Galah	Victoria Men's Roller Derby (Sports Team)
FE3C	Fuzz	Brisbane City Rollers
404	HP Shovecraft	Brisbane City Rollers
75	Justin Credible	Sydney City SMASH
E61	KANEAGE!	Brisbane City Rollers
89	Kernel Panic	Sydney City SMASH
88	Monkey Nuts	Sydney City SMASH
1957	Mr Spew	Sydney City SMASH
8	Oliver Sudden	Perth Men's Derby
E11	RAMPAGE	Perth Men's Derby
47	Rogue N Josh	Light City Derby
71	RPG	Brisbane City Rollers
11	Sausarge Rolls	Bass Strait Brawlers
0	Skate Pilgrim	Victoria Men's Roller Derby (Sports Team)
505	Son Of Skatin	Victoria Men's Roller Derby (Sports Team)
633	Synaptic Kid	Tweed Valley Rollers
27	Ya Mum	Sydney City SMASH

=== Coaching staff ===
- Annabelle Lecter - Bench Coach
- I.V. Anarchy- Lineup Manager

=== Captains ===
- Flamin' Galah
- Mr Spew

=== MRDWC 2014 ===
The Wizards of AUS started the tournament in Blue Group in which they ranked second and drew England in the Semifinal.

Power of Scotland Friendly Australia 422 def Scotland 81

Playoff game one - Australia 232 def Germany 12

Playoff game two - Australia 111 def Ireland 65

Playoff game three - France 117 def Australia 57

Semifinal - England 388 def Australia 138

Quarter Final - Australia 252 def Argentina 238

5th place playoff - Australia 201 def Wales national men's roller derby team 200

Australia finished the tournament in 5th place.

=== Awards ===
- World Cup Plate - The Wizards of AUS won the Plate Cup and were ranked 5th after the Men's Roller Derby World Cup 2014
- Tournament star Jammer - Sausarge Rolls
- Tournament star Blocker - Ass N Junk
- Power of Scotland Bout MVP - RPG

== New Zealand 2013 Bout Roster ==
On 8 July 2013 the Roster was announced for the 17 August game against the New Zealand Black Skates in Sydney. (skaters' league affiliations as of the time of the announcement)

Australia 330 New Zealand 122

Number	Name	League
77	Bohemian Slapcity	Sydney City SMASH
80	Flamin' Galah	Victorian Roller Derby League
29	G-man	Toowoomba Men's Roller Derby
46	Hellton	Brisbane City Rollers
89	Kernel Panic	Sydney City SMASH
88	Monkey Nuts	Sydney City SMASH
1957	Mr Spew	Sydney City SMASH
8	Oliver Sudden	Perth Men's Derby
C4	Pandamonium	Sydney City SMASH
QU4D	PandaNH4+	Perth Men's Derby
E11	RAMPAGE	Perth Men's Derby
47	Rogue N Josh	Light City Derby
71	RPG	Brisbane City Rollers
505	Son Of Skatin	Geelong Roller Derby League
27	Ya Mum	Sydney City SMASH
156	WHiPPASNAPPA	Toowoomba Men's Roller Derby

=== Coaching staff ===
- Annabelle Lecter - Bench Coach
- I.V. Anarchy- Lineup Manager
- Under Ceej - Team Manager

=== Captains ===
- Mr Spew
- RAMPAGE

=== Awards ===
- MANZ Cup - The Wizards of AUS won the Men's Australian and New Zealand Cup
- MVP - WHiPPASNAPPA
- Best Jammer - Hellton
- Best Blocker - RAMPAGE
- Most Feared - Kernel Panic
