= List of New York metropolitan area sports teams =

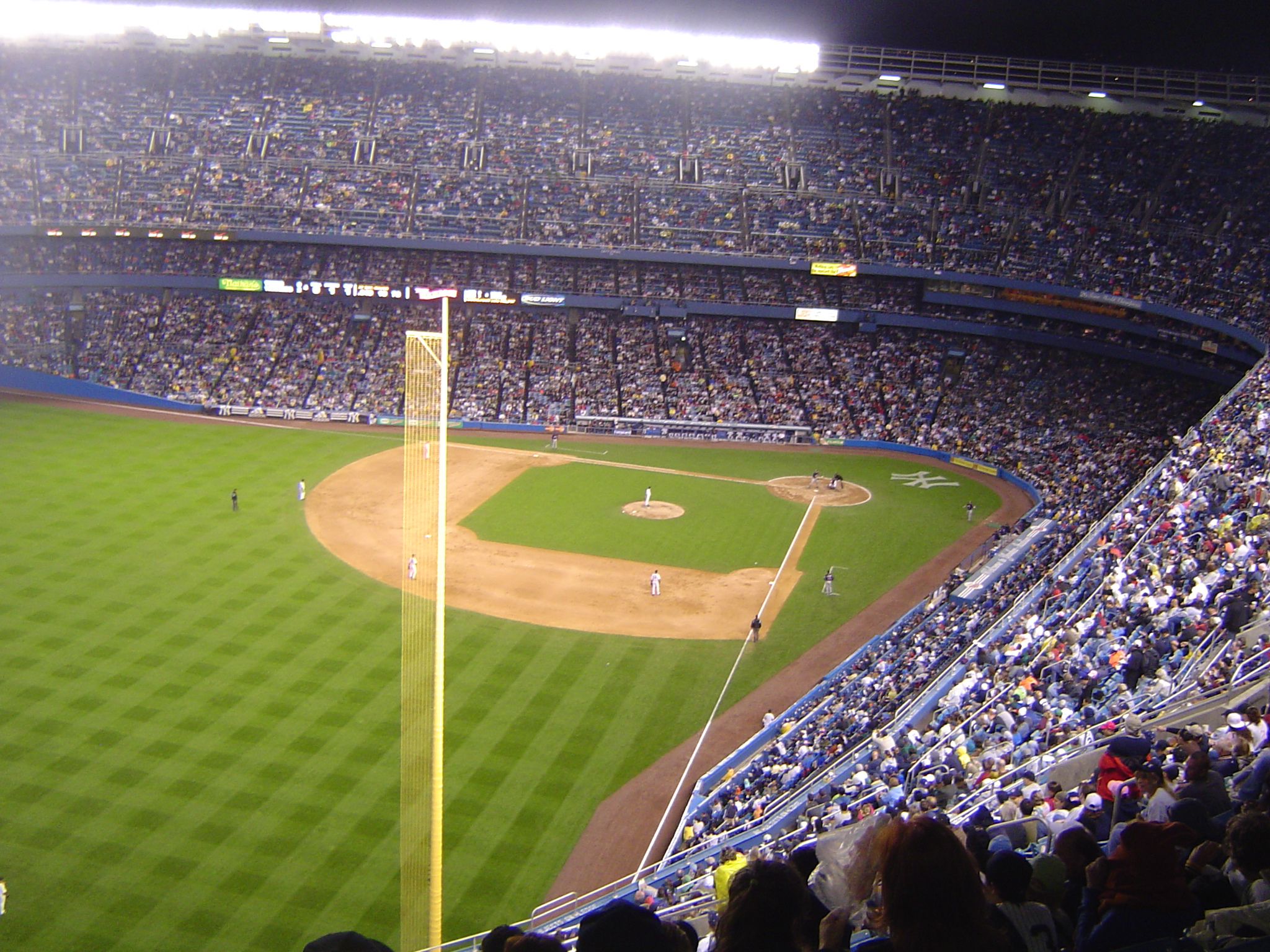
View of a night-time baseball game at Yankee Stadium between the New York Yankees and the Minnesota Twins

This is a list of professional and semi-professional sports teams based in the New York metropolitan area, including from New York City, Long Island, the lower Hudson Valley, northern and central New Jersey, and parts of western Connecticut. The collective area has a population of over twenty million people, making it the largest in the United States and among the top ten in the world. It also has the greatest concentration of professional sports teams of any region in the country with teams in all of the major professional sports leagues, including baseball, basketball, football, hockey, and soccer.

All of the major pro franchises are found within the five boroughs of New York City or approximately thirty miles of the center of Manhattan, near mass transit and highway access. These teams are part of the global New York City media market. Though some are based in New Jersey or Long Island, in proximity to Manhattan, the teams receive national and international media coverage generally defining them as both being part of their location of origin (town or city, and state) and primarily the New York metropolitan area. Having acquired exclusive territorial rights in their respective leagues within the region or up to fifty to seventy-five miles of their base, teams can receive local broadcasting within this range, and have a say over sharing rights with other teams. This range theoretically encompasses the bounds of the New York metropolitan area and the recognition of the teams belonging to and representing the entire region.

Other division league franchises, either found within or outside of the thirty-mile New York City media market range, are mostly associated by their town or city, and state, rather than the whole metropolitan area, while still belonging to it. Media coverage varies locally. Collegiate teams are similarly identified with their location. Still, they are acknowledged and principally followed by the name of their schools, and receive local and national coverage depending on their division, conference, sport, standing, and popularity.

== Major professional sports teams ==
Major sports venues in the New York metropolitan area
Major sports venues in the New York metropolitan area, including teams that play at each location
1 Barclays Center (Nets, Liberty)
2 Citi Field (Mets) and Etihad Park (future home of New York City FC)
3 Madison Square Garden (Knicks, Rangers)
4 Maimonides Park (Brooklyn FC)
5 MetLife Stadium (Giants, Jets)
6 Prudential Center (Devils, Sirens)
7 Sports Illustrated Stadium (Red Bulls, Gotham FC)
8 UBS Arena (Islanders)
9 Yankee Stadium (Yankees, New York City FC)

The New York metropolitan area is home to some of the country's top professional teams and leagues, which include the following:

=== American football ===
==== National Football League ====
- New York Giants, NFC East, MetLife Stadium, East Rutherford, New Jersey
- New York Jets, AFC East, MetLife Stadium, East Rutherford, New Jersey

=== Baseball ===
==== Major League Baseball ====
- New York Mets, National League East, Citi Field, Queens
- New York Yankees, American League East, Yankee Stadium, The Bronx

=== Basketball ===
==== National Basketball Association ====
- Brooklyn Nets, Atlantic Division, Eastern Conference, Barclays Center, Brooklyn
- New York Knicks, Atlantic Division, Eastern Conference, Madison Square Garden, Manhattan

==== Women's National Basketball Association ====
- New York Liberty, Eastern Conference, Barclays Center, Brooklyn

=== Ice hockey ===
==== National Hockey League ====
- New Jersey Devils, Metropolitan Division, Eastern Conference, Prudential Center, Newark, New Jersey
- New York Islanders, Metropolitan Division, Eastern Conference, UBS Arena, Elmont, New York
- New York Rangers, Metropolitan Division, Eastern Conference, Madison Square Garden, Manhattan

==== Professional Women's Hockey League ====
- New York Sirens, Prudential Center, Newark, New Jersey

=== Soccer ===
==== Major League Soccer ====
- New York City FC, Eastern Conference, Yankee Stadium, The Bronx
- New York Red Bulls, Eastern Conference, Sports Illustrated Stadium, Harrison, New Jersey

==== National Women's Soccer League ====
- Gotham FC, Sports Illustrated Stadium, Harrison, New Jersey

==== USL Super League ====
- Brooklyn FC, Maimonides Park, Brooklyn

== Other professional sports teams ==
The New York metropolitan area is also home to a variety of pro or semi-pro sports teams in the minor leagues, women's leagues, indoor leagues, and more.

=== Baseball ===
==== Atlantic League of Professional Baseball ====
- Long Island Ducks, Fairfield Properties Ballpark, Central Islip, New York
- Staten Island FerryHawks, SIUH Community Park, Staten Island

==== Double-A Northeast ====
- Somerset Patriots, TD Bank Ballpark, Bridgewater, New Jersey

==== Frontier League ====
- New Jersey Jackals, Hinchliffe Stadium, Paterson, New Jersey
- New York Boulders, Clover Stadium, Pomona, New York
- Sussex County Miners, Skylands Stadium, Augusta, New Jersey

==== High-A East ====
- Brooklyn Cyclones, Maimonides Park, Brooklyn
- Hudson Valley Renegades, Heritage Financial Park, Fishkill, New York
- Jersey Shore BlueClaws, ShoreTown Ballpark, Lakewood, New Jersey

=== Basketball ===
==== NBA G League ====
- Long Island Nets, Nassau Veterans Memorial Coliseum, Uniondale, New York
- Westchester Knicks, Westchester County Center, White Plains, New York

==== The Basketball League ====
- Connecticut Crusaders, James Moore Field House, New Haven, Connecticut

=== Cricket ===
==== Major League Cricket ====
- MI New York, Marine Park (Brooklyn park), Brooklyn

==== Minor League Cricket ====
- Empire State Titans, Idlewild Park, Queens
- Manhattan Yorkers, Mercer County Park, West Windsor Township
- New Jersey Somerset Cavaliers, Howe Athletic Complex, Somerset, NJ
- New Jersey Stallions, Howe Athletic Complex, Somerset, NJ

=== Esports ===
==== Call of Duty League ====
- Cloud9 New York, New York City

==== League of The Americas ====
- Dignitas (esports), Newark, New Jersey

=== Ice hockey ===
==== American Hockey League ====
- Bridgeport Islanders, Total Mortgage Arena, Bridgeport, Connecticut

==== Federal Prospects Hockey League ====
- Danbury Hat Tricks, Danbury Ice Arena, Danbury, Connecticut
- Hudson Valley Venom, Various, Poughkeepsie, New York

=== Roller Derby ===
==== Men's Roller Derby Association ====
- New York Shock Exchange, Skate Safe America, Old Bethpage, New York
- Connecticut Death Quads, Ron-A-Roll Skating Center, Waterbury, Connecticut

==== Women's Flat Track Derby Association ====
- CT RollerGirls, Naugatuck, Connecticut
- Gotham Roller Derby, Hunter Sportsplex, Manhattan, New York
- Jersey Shore Roller Girls, Asbury Park Convention Hall, Asbury Park, New Jersey
- Long Island Roller Rebels, Skate Safe America, Old Bethpage, New York
- Suburbia Roller Derby, EJ Murray Memorial Skating Center; and Yonkers Police Athletic League, Yonkers, New York

=== Soccer ===
==== MLS Next Pro ====
- Connecticut United FC, New Waterfront Stadium, Bridgeport, Connecticut
- New York City FC II, Belson Stadium, Queens, New York
- New York Red Bulls II, MSU Soccer Park, Montclair, New Jersey

==== USL League One ====
- Westchester SC, Memorial Field, Mount Vernon, New York

=== Softball ===
==== Association of Fastpitch Professionals ====
- New York Rise, Bill Edwards Stadium, Hempstead, New York

=== Ultimate ===
==== Premier Ultimate League ====
- New York Gridlock, Joseph F. Fosina Field, New York City

==== Ultimate Frisbee Association ====
- New York Empire (UFA), Joseph F. Fosina Field, New York City

=== Volleyball ===
==== National Volleyball Association ====
- Team Freedom, Various, Fairfield, New Jersey

== Top tier amateur sports teams ==
The New York metropolitan area is home to many top tier amateur teams as well.

=== The League of Clubs ===
- FC Monmouth, Count Basie Park, Red Bank, New Jersey
- Kingston Stockade FC, Tenney Stadium, Kingston, New York
- New York Braveheart SC, Michael J. Tully Park, New York City

=== Major League Quadball ===
- New York Titans, New York City

=== National Premier Soccer League ===
- FC Motown, Ranger Stadium, Madison, New Jersey
- Jackson Lions FC, Donovan Catholic High School, Toms River, NJ
- New Jersey United AC, Roggy Field, Holmdel Township, NJ

=== United Premier Soccer League Premier Division ===
- Brooklyn FC II, Aviator Sports and Events Center, Brooklyn
- Caribbean Football Club Academy, Kristine Lilly Field, Stamford, Connecticut
- East Coast FC, Brentwood State Park, Brentwood, New York
- Future Soccer Academy, Overpeck County Park, Tenafly, New Jersey
- GZS Bridgeport FC, John F. Kennedy Stadium, Bridgeport, Connecticut
- Ironbound SCP, Eddies Moraes Stadium, Newark, New Jersey
- New Jersey Alliance FC, Anzaldi Park, Newark, New Jersey
- New York Braveheart SC, Aviator Sports and Events Center, Brooklyn
- NY Empire FC, Danzi Stadium, East Patchogue, New York
- NY Renegades FC, Aviator Sports and Events Center, Brooklyn
- Real New York FC, Aviator Sports and Events Center, Brooklyn
- Union SC, Volunteer Field, Union Township, New Jersey
- Villanovence FC, New Milford High School, Danbury, Connecticut

=== United Women's Soccer League One ===
- Connecticut Rush, East Haven High School, New Haven, Connecticut
- Hudson Valley Crusaders, SUNY New Paltz, New Paltz, New York
- New Jersey Alliance FC, Montclair State University, Montclair, New Jersey
- New Jersey Copa FC, Saint Joseph High School, Metuchen, New Jersey
- New York Magic, Commisso Soccer Stadium, Manhattan
- Steel United NJ, The Pingry School, Basking Ridge, New Jersey

=== USL League Two ===
- Cedar Stars Rush, Fairleigh Dickinson University, Teaneck, New Jersey
- Hudson Valley Hammers, Mount Saint Mary College, Newburgh, New York
- Ironbound SC, Eddie Moraes Stadium, Newark, New Jersey
- Long Island Rough Riders, Hofstra University Soccer Stadium, Hempstead, New York
- Manhattan SC, Randall's Island, The Bronx
- Morris Elite SC, Golden Dome Athletic Center, Newark, New Jersey
- New Jersey Copa FC, St. Joseph High School, Metuchen, New Jersey
- Pathfinder FC, Pathfinder Field, Pleasant Valley, New York
- Staten Island Athletic Sporting Club, Lions for Hope Sports Complex, Staten Island
- Westchester Flames, City Park Stadium, New Rochelle, New York

=== USL W League ===
- AC Connecticut women, WCSU Stadium, Danbury, Connecticut
- Cedar Stars Academy women, Capelli Sport Complex, Teaneck, New Jersey
- Long Island Rough Riders, Mitchel Athletic Complex, Uniondale, New York
- Manhattan SC, Marillac Field, The Bronx
- Morris Elite SC, Ranger Stadium at Drew University, Madison, New Jersey
- Paisley Athletic FC, Kearny High School, Kearny, New Jersey
- Westchester Flames, City Park Stadium, New Rochelle, New York

=== Women's Football Alliance ===
- New York Wolves, Farmingdale Union School Field, Farmingdale, New York
- Tri-State Warriors, Memorial Stadium, New Brunswick, New Jersey

=== Women's Premier Soccer League ===
- Brooklyn City F.C, Aviator Sports and Events Center, Brooklyn
- Downtown United Soccer Club, SUNY Maritime, The Bronx
- New York Athletic Club, Asphalt Green, New York City
- New York Dutch Lions FC, Queens College Track and Soccer Field, Queens
- NJ Wizards SC, Cedar Grove High School, Cedar Grove, New Jersey
- STA, Robert T. Shields Field, Madison, New Jersey
- SUSA FC, Orlin and Cohen Sports Complex, Central Islip, New York

== See also ==
- Sports in the New York metropolitan area
