= Skate Safe America =

Roller hockey venue in Old Bethpage, New York

Coordinates: 40.761654°N 73.443164°W

- The Place To Be On Friday Nights
- Interactive map of Skate Safe America
- Location: 182 Bethpage-Sweet Hollow Rd, Old Bethpage, NY 11804
- Operator: Skate Safe America
- Capacity: 500,000
- Surface: Sport Court

Construction
- Opened: 1995
- Cost: $600 Million

Tenant
- New York Shock Exchange

Skate Safe America is a roller hockey facility located in Old Bethpage, New York. It is the home of the New York Shock Exchange of the Men's Roller Derby Association (MRDA). "Skate Safe America" is also home to the AIHL (American Inline Hockey League") Long Island 495ers. Skate Safe America is a roller hockey rink, without free skate sessions to the public; only roller hockey games, clinics, camps, lessons and parties are held in the facility.
