= Tui Lyon =

Australian roller derby player

Personal information
- Nationality: Australian
- Born: Tallangatta, Australia

Sport
- Country: Australia
- Sport: Roller derby
- Club: WFTDA; Victorian Roller Derby League (2008-10); Tiger Bay Brawlers (2010-2012); Victorian Roller Derby League (2012-16); Angel City Derby (2016-present)
- Team: VRDL All Stars (2012-16); Hollywood Scarlets (2016-present)

Achievements and titles
- Regional finals: WFTDA Division 1 Playoffs winner: 2015

Tui Lyon is an Australian roller derby player.

Born in Tallangatta in Victoria, Australia, Lyon began skating with the Victorian Roller Derby League in Melbourne in 2008. In 2010, she moved to Cardiff in Wales, where she played for the Tiger Bay Brawlers, then she returned to Victoria in 2012. At the 2014 Roller Derby World Cup, Lyon played for Team Australia. She also became a coach of the Australian men's roller derby team, the Wizards of Aus, and was their bench coach at the 2016 Men's Roller Derby World Cup.

While Victoria played roller derby at the highest level, Lyon found the expense of regularly travelling to the United States to compete to be too high. As a result, in January 2016 she moved to Los Angeles to join the Angel City Derby Girls. She soon became captain of the Angel City Hollywood Scarlets. She again competed for Australia at the 2018 Roller Derby World Cup, at which the team took the silver medal, and Lyon received the Most Valuable Player award.

Lyon specialises in playing as a pivot. Six feet tall, she has described her playing style as trying to embody the concept "stay low, get lower".
