= Roller derby in Mexico =

Mexico's roller derby national governing body is the Asociación Mexicana de Roller Derby. Leagues are also part of the Women's Flat Track Derby Association (WFTDA) as well as the Men's Roller Derby Association (MRDA) for international gameplay and rankings.

Mexico's national team Team México Roller Derby made its world cup debut at the 2014 Roller Derby World Cup held in Dallas, Texas.

== Leagues ==
- Baja California - Baja Roller Derby
- Ciudad Juárez - Juárez Roller Derby
- Ciudad de Mexico - Discordias Roller Derby
- Ciudad de Mexico - Disorder Roller Derby
- Ciudad de Mexico - Mexico City Roller Derby

== See also ==
- Roller derby
