= Southern Discomfort Roller Derby =

Roller derby league

- Metro area: London
- Country: England
- Founded: 2010
- Teams: Knights of Southern Discomfort (A team); Mild Discomfort (B team)
- Track type: Flat
- Venue: Various
- Website: sdrd.online

Southern Discomfort Roller Derby (SDRD) is a men's roller derby league based in London, England. Founded in 2010, the league consists of two teams which compete against teams from other leagues. They were members of the Men's Roller Derby Association (MRDA) until suspension in 2021, and are current members of the United Kingdom Roller Derby Association (UKRDA).

== League History ==
The league was founded in November 2010, initially as a south of England representative team. After playing a single bout against the Northern England Roller Dudes (NERD), it remained inactive until August 2011, when it was resurrected on a permanent basis. In September, SDRD played a further game against the Northern England Roller Dudes, then later in the year suffered its first defeat to a mixed team of skaters from two new leagues: The Inhuman League from Sheffield, and Tyne and Fear Roller Derby from Newcastle upon Tyne.

Late in 2011, Southern Discomfort was again involved in two firsts for UK roller derby: the first international men's bout, against Roller Derby Toulouse's Quad Guards, and the first women vs men game, against the London Rockin' Rollers. In 2013, Southern Discomfort skater "Sutton Impact" said the league's greatest rivalry was with Toulouse.

In 2012, Southern Discomfort won the first Men's European Roller Derby Championships, and also played a hard-fought game against the New York Shock Exchange on their tour of Europe. In December, Southern Discomfort was accepted as one of the first three non-American members of the Men's Roller Derby Association (MRDA). They followed this in May 2013 by competing in the Big O tournament in Eugene, Oregon, at which they played Golden State Heat, Puget Sound Outcast Derby and Deep Valley Belligerents.

In 2017 Southern Discomfort competed in MRDA Championships in Wales, the first time this level of tournament had been held outside of North America in the men's game. During the tournament SDRD bested Puget Sound Outcast Derby, but were beaten by Portland Men's Roller Derby, and the San Diego Aftershocks. Southern Discomfort finished 4th in this tournament, ahead of its European rivals.

In 2018, Southern Discomfort again competed in the MRDA Championships, this time hosted in Salem, Oregon, by Portland Men's Roller Derby. Southern Discomfort went into the tournament ranked third, but following an unexpected defeat to The Vancouver Murder, dropped in their post-tournament ranking to 11th.

Previous Southern Discomfort Roller Derby logo, until March 2022

Southern Discomfort were ranked fifth in the world in the MRDA rankings in March 2020. The league's membership of the association was rescinded in June 2021 after a number of HR complaints were raised regarding several league members, and the Men's Roller Derby Association felt that these were not dealt with timeously in line with the required standards and therefore the league were felt to not be fulfilling the requirements of a member league as per the Code of Conduct.

== Men's Roller Derby Association Suspensions ==
Various league members were suspended from the MRDA in 2019 following sexual assault and harassment allegations.

Following investigation of the allegations, Savage Hun faced a three game suspension and a year of probation based on the Code Of Conduct violations assessed from two victim statements. Horndog, Rolling Thunder and Sutton Impact were banned from the MRDA for 2 years. Ballistic Whistle was placed on probation for 1 year from the point of reinstatement to any MRDA league.

Preceded by New competition	Men's European Roller Derby Championship Winners; 2012	Succeeded by Toulouse Quad Guards
Preceded by Toulouse Quad Guards	Men's European Roller Derby Championship Winners; 2014	Succeeded by Replaced by Men's European Cup
Preceded by New competition	Men's European Cup Winners; 2015–2016	Succeeded by Current holders
Preceded by New competition	British Roller Derby Championships Men's Tier 1 Champions; 2015–2016	Succeeded by Tyne and Fear Roller Derby
