= Mo Sanders =

American roller skater (born 1971)

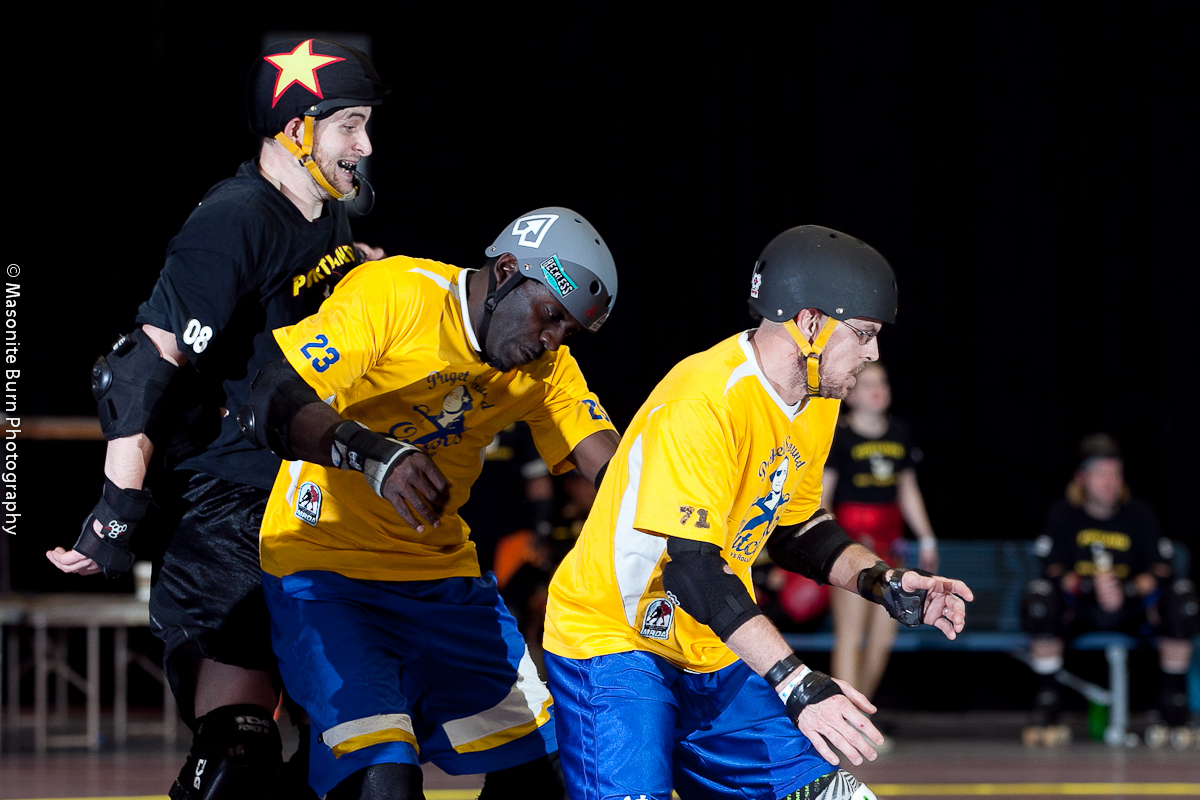
- Sanders (center), skating as Quadzilla L.K., uses a can opener move on the opposing jammer

Personal information
- Nickname: Quadzilla L.K.
- Nationality: American
- Born: 1971 (age 54–55) Tacoma, Washington
- Height: 6 ft (1.8 m)

Achievements and titles
- National finals: Men's Roller Derby Association Championships: 2nd place 2011

Mo Sanders (born 1971), known as Quadzilla L.K. or simply Quadzilla, is an American roller skater, who has competed at international level in roller derby and aggressive inline skating, and national level in jam skating.

Sanders was born in Tacoma, Washington, USA. His father often rollerskated to work, and Sanders spent much of his spare time at the local roller rink. Although largely self-taught, he was also coached by Lann Werner, a champion artistic roller skater. He acquired the nickname "Lanny's Kid", the initials of which appear in his derby name.

Sanders began skating on inline skates in 1991, and became a professional aggressive inline skater in 1993, competing in the X Games. In the late 1990s, Sanders spent time skating in California, particularly at Venice Beach, and while there he heard about auditions for RollerJam, a television show based around banked track roller derby. On the show, he was known for his multicolored hair, and for his acrobatic moves. He later claimed that the staged nature of the show "sucked" and he believed that it proved unsuccessful because "there was too much drama, too much scripting".

By late 2001, Sanders was back in Seattle and attracted attention for break dancing on skates. By 2005, he was part of the "Quad Express" jam skating team, who reached the national finals of the Roll Bounce Championship. He subsequently performed at the Hollywood opening of the Roll Bounce film, and this led to involvement with Enchanted, in which he appeared and for which he choreographed much of the skating.

With the development of flat track roller derby, Sanders returned to the sport, skating both as "Quadzilla L.K." and, occasionally, as "Barack O'Trauma". He coached the Oly Rollers, then the Rat City Rollergirls, and bench managed Team Awesome to second place in the national banked track championship in 2008, then Team Legit to take the national title in 2009. He traveled internationally to coach various leagues, and developed both Antik skate boots and Heartless Wheels.

Sanders stood down as Rat City's principal coach in 2011, but he remained active as a skater with Puget Sound Outcast Derby and was a key member of the team which took second place in the 2011 Men's Roller Derby Association Championships. In connection with this, he has appeared in the roller derby documentaries Derby Baby and This Is How We Roll. Sanders also won the "Best Double Threat" title at the Derby News Network's 2011 awards.

In 2016 he featured in an Australian-based skate documentary called “Wheels will land”

Sanders is known for his ability to jump long distances on skates. His record is jumping over fourteen people.

Sanders, or also known on this league as "QuadZilla," currently plays, and coaches, some of the teams in The Dallas Derby Devils league, which is located in Dallas, Texas.
