= Victoria Men's Roller Derby =

Roller derby league

- Metro area: Melbourne, Victoria
- Country: Australia
- Founded: Early 2013
- Teams: Victorian Vanguard
- Track type: Flat
- Org. type: NPO
- Website: www.facebook.com/VictoriaMensRollerDerby/

Victoria Men's Roller Derby (VMRD) is a flat track men's roller derby league based in Melbourne, Victoria, Australia. Founded in early 2013, VMRD is one of the premier men's roller derby leagues in Australia, having won three Australian Men's Roller Derby (AMRD) National Championships ('Men's Nationals'). The representative side for the league is called Victorian Vanguard and is often referred to as the 'Travel Team', as they travel to other cities to play opposing teams. VMRD are skater owned and operated.

VMRD are currently ranked 13th in the Men's Roller Derby Association (MRDA). To date they have played 30 games against other men's roller derby teams, with only three losses.

== History ==
VMRD played a solitary game in 2013, against Tasmania Men's in November, winning 294–116.

In 2014 they played three games played outside the Men's Nationals tournament (see below) with convincing wins against Tweed Valley Men's 424-92 and Adelaide's Light City 276–108. However the team suffered their first loss, to Brisbane's BCR Men's 210–165. According to some members of the team, this loss is disputed, however further details are not known. Notably, they also played the #1 Australian ranked women's team VRDL All stars (a well established WFTDA team ranked 5th in the world at the time) losing 239–69.

In 2015 they defeated Brisbane BCR Men's 170–135, avenging the previous year's defeat. They again lost to the women's VRDL All Stars 204–111, however defeated the highly ranked Australian women's team VRDL Queen Bees 245–115.

The team started 2016 with a significant 196-61 win over Canberra's Capital Carnage and a second win over VRDL Queen Bees 223–169. This turned out to be a standout year, with VMRD winning their third Men's Nationals title, achieving their highest ever points differential (+313) and finishing the season undefeated.

== 2017 season ==
VMRD played their first game of 2017 in March, defeating Sydney Smash 217–130. In April they won the inaugural MRDA Down Under tournament in Sydney, defeating the Thunderquads from Argentina 190–108 in a hotly contested game. In May, they were selected as one of only a handful of men's roller derby teams to play at The Big O Tournament in Eugene, Oregon in May; the largest roller derby tournament in the world. This marks the first time Australian men's derby was represented in an international roller derby tournament.

VMRD recently played the VRDL Queen Bees at the VRDL 10th Anniversary Gala. VMRD won, and became the first holders of the "Cupcake Cup."

2017 Season
Event	Opponent	Result	Score
MRDA Down Under	Canberra Capital Carnage	Win	264-96
MRDA Down Under	Brisbane Mens Scartel	Win	310-41
MRDA Down Under	Sydney City Smash	Win	250-73
MRDA Down Under	Argentina Thunderquads	Win	190-108
The Big O	Lane County	Win	237-102
The Big O	Puget Sound Outcasts	Loss	366-59
The Big O	Chinook Reservoir Dogs	Win	194-132
The Big O	Vancouver Murder	Loss	274-80

== Men's National Championship ==
VMRD won the inaugural 2014 Australian Men's Roller Derby (AMRD) National Championships held in Ipswich, Queensland, defeating Tasmania Men's in the final 158–97. This was Australia's first national men's roller derby tournament and also included a team from New Zealand. Nine teams took part in the tournament.

2014 National Championship (Inaugural)
Round	Team 1	Score	Score	Team 2
Pool	Vanguard	129	100	Tasmania Brawlers
Pool	Vanguard	187	25	Manawatu (NZ)
Semi Final	Vanguard	97	67	Sydney City Smash
Grand Final	Vanguard	158	97	Tasmania Men's

In 2015, the team played five games at Men's Nationals, defending their title with a win over Sydney City Smash, 256–110.

2015 National Championship
Round	Team 1	Score	Score	Team 2
Pool	Vanguard	391	97	Perth Men's
Pool	Vanguard	146	106	Sydney City Smash
Pool	Vanguard	323	107	Adelaide Light City
Semi Final	Vanguard	287	70	Canberra Capital Carnage
Grand Final	Vanguard	256	110	Sydney City Smash

VMRD defeated Sydney City Smash 303-91 in the Grand Final, in a repeat of the previous year's Grand Final. Overall, Victorian Vanguard scored a combined total of 1403 points against all teams whilst conceding only 490.

2016 National Championship
Round	Team 1	Score	Score	Team 2
Pool	Vanguard	158	66	Adelaide Light City
Pool	Vanguard	324	11	Canberra Capital Carnage
Pool	Vanguard	211	41	Tasmania Men's Brawlers
Semi Final	Vanguard	243	70	Brisbane Mens Scartel
Grand Final	Vanguard	303	91	Sydney City Smash

VMRD defeated Sydney City Smash 303-91 in the Grand Final, in a repeat of the previous year's Grand Final. Overall, Victorian Vanguard scored a combined total of 1403 points against other teams whilst conceding only 490.

The 2017 Men's National Championship, hosted by Coff's Coast Derby, will be held on 11–12 November in Coffs Harbour, NSW

== Branding & Logo ==
The original Victorian Vanguard logo featured the word 'Victorian' in the background with a dominant looking warrior in front, holding a round shield with a star, under which the word "Vanguard" is displayed. The star, is the same symbol worn by the jammer (point scorer) in roller derby. The shield represents defensive tactics and ability. The term 'Vanguard' originates with the medieval French avant-garde, i.e. the ward in front and refers to (in military parlance) the foremost part of an advancing army force. The use of military terms in sport and the association with battle is both well documented and deliberate.

The league has recently undergone a branding and logo change. Whilst the star and shield have been carried over from the original logo, the name Vanguard has been replaced with words Victoria Men's Roller Derby above the letters VMRD. Some say this is to better reflect the league as a whole with skaters and non-skating members (as well as officials) rather than solely a team of skaters.

== Men's Roller Derby World Cup ==
Numerous members of the team have represented Team Australia at the Men's Roller Derby World Cup, most recently in 2016 placing 3rd after defeating Canada 243–174. The 2018 World Cup will be held in Barcelona, Spain on 5–8 April

== Men's Roller Derby Association ==
In August 2016 VMRD became an official member of the Men's Roller Derby Association (MRDA), the international governing body of men's flat track roller derby. VMRD are ranked 13th in the world, under the official MRDA ranking.

Victorian Vanguard played in the first ever MRDA sanctioned game in Australia, against Sydney City Smash in the Gand Final of the 2016 AMRD National Championships.
