= Connecticut Death Quads =

US roller derby league

- Metro area: Waterbury, CT
- Country: United States
- Founded: 2007
- Track type(s): Flat
- Venue: Ron-A-Roll Skating Center
- Website: ctdeathquads.wordpress.com

The Connecticut Death Quads (CTDQ) is a men's roller derby league based in Waterbury, Connecticut. It consists of a single team, which plays against teams from other leagues.

Founded in 2007, the league played its first bout in July 2007.

The league joined the Men's Derby Coalition in 2008, becoming its fourth member. It competed in the first Derby Coalition championship, taking fourth place after losing to the New York Shock Exchange and Harm City Homicide. The Coalition subsequently became the Men's Roller Derby Association.

The Death Quads have a close relationship with the CT RollerGirls women's derby league. In April 2013, it was ranked number 13 in the world.
