= Magic City =

Magic City may refer to:

== Cities ==
=== Italy ===
- Turin

=== United States ===
- Barberton, Ohio
- Billings, Montana
- Birmingham, Alabama
- Bogalusa, Louisiana
- Charleroi, Pennsylvania
- Cheyenne, Wyoming
- Endicott, New York
- Florence, South Carolina
- Miami, Florida
- Middlesboro, Kentucky
- Minot, North Dakota
- Moberly, Missouri
- Muncie, Indiana
- Roanoke, Virginia
- South Omaha, Nebraska

== Art and entertainment ==
=== Music ===
==== Albums ====
- Magic City (MC Magic album), 2006
- Magic City (P-Money album), 2004
- The Magic City (Helium album), 1997
- The Magic City (Sun Ra album), 1966

==== Songs ====
- "Magic City", by 2XL from Neighborhood Rapstar
- "Magic City", by Buju Banton from Rasta Got Soul
- "Magic City", by Fivio Foreign from B.I.B.L.E.
- "Magic City", by Gorillaz from The Now Now
- "Magic City", by Yngwie Malmsteen from Perpetual Flame

=== Other art and entertainment ===
- Magic City (TV series), a 2012 American TV series
- The Magic City (novel), a 1910 novel by Edith Nesbit
- Magic City, a fresco by Jean-Michel Folon inside the Montgomery metro station, Brussels, Belgium
- "Magic City", a short story by Nelson S. Bond included in the collection The Far Side of Nowhere

== Sports ==
- Magic City Misfits (MCM), a roller derby league based in Jacksonville, Florida, US
- Magic City Snowbears, a defunct professional basketball club based in Minot, North Dakota, US

== Venues and enterprises ==
- Magic-City, an amusement park in Paris, France
- Magic City (club), a strip club in Atlanta, Georgia, US

== See also ==
- Magic Town, a 1947 American film
- Pueblos Mágicos (Magical Towns), a Mexican tourism initiative promoting over 100 small locales throughout the country
