= Pioneer Valley Roller Derby =

Roller derby league

- Metro area: Northampton, MA
- Country: United States
- Teams: The Dirty Dozen (men's travel team); Western Mass Destruction (women's A team); Quabbin Missile Crisis (women's B team); United Front (all-/no-gender team)
- Track type(s): Flat
- Venue: Various
- Affiliations: MRDA
- Website: www.pioneervalleyrollerderby.com

Pioneer Valley Roller Derby (PVRD) is a roller derby league based in Northampton, Massachusetts. Founded in early 2006, the league was the first in the new flat-track roller derby movement that featured both women's and men's teams.

The league was founded after two friends went to watch Providence Roller Derby play. The men's team, the Dirty Dozen, was the first flat track men's roller derby team in the U.S. Having male skaters made the league ineligible to affiliate with the Women's Flat Track Derby Association (WFTDA), the leading organization for flat-track roller derby, although Pioneer Valley Roller Derby does skate to WFTDA rules.

Early members of the league included "Big Vinny's Kid", the daughter of a former roller derby skater.

The men's teams early bouts included one against the referees of Charm City Roller Girls, and the New York Shock Exchange's first bout, which Pioneer Valley lost 109-51. Later in 2007, the league worked with these two groups to found the Men's Derby Coalition (MDC). The Dirty Dozen came second in the MDC's 2010 Championship, losing to New York in the final. The MDC subsequently became the Men's Roller Derby Association (MRDA), and Erich Bennar of Pioneer Valley was elected as its president in 2011. The Dirty Dozen were ranked fifth for the 2011 MRDA Championship, although they lost both their bouts, to finish sixth.

One skater from Pioneer Valley was selected for France at the 2011 Roller Derby World Cup.
