= Manchester Roller Derby =

Roller derby league

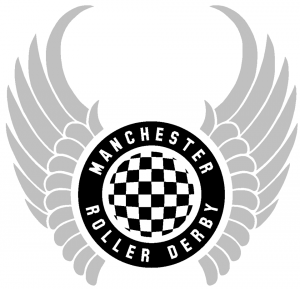
- The logo of Manchester Roller Derby
- Metro area: Manchester
- Country: England
- Founded: 2010
- Teams: Valkyries (women's A team); Furies (women's B team); New Wheeled Order (men's A team); Chaos Engine (men's B team)
- Track type(s): Flat
- Venue: Various
- Affiliations: MRDA
- Website: www.manchesterrollerderby.com

Manchester Roller Derby (MRD) is a flat track roller derby league based in Manchester, England. Founded in 2010, as the first co-ed league in the UK, they became members of the Men's Roller Derby Association in December 2012 and of United Kingdom Roller Derby Association in November 2013.

== History ==
Initially formed in 2010, MRD attracted attention in early 2011 when the league's original women's team played Hot Wheel Roller Derby at the Manchester Academy in a sell-out bout.

In November 2012, MRD hosted a bout as part of the New York Shock Exchange's 'Shock the UK' tour, which saw New Wheeled Order bout against the New York team. This was the first intercontinental men's flat track derby game.

The league formed a co-ed team known as the MRD Allstars to participate in the UK's first co-ed roller derby tournament in January 2013. MRD Allstars won this tournament against competition from Birmingham's Wheels of Mass Destruction, Nottingham Roller Derby and Sheffield Roller Derby.

As of March 2020, New Wheeled Order are ranked 7th in the MRDA.

As of 2022, Manchester Valkyries are Manchester Roller Derby's WFTDA team. The team was formed in 2022 as part of the return to track effort, in the wake of the global COVID-19 pandemic. Manchester Valkyries' first public game was the Five Nations Roller Derby (5NRD) “Back on Track Showcase” in August 2022. Since then, Manchester Valkyries have continued to compete and most notably were crowned the North West Quest tournament winners in October 2022.

In 2023 Manchester Valkyries will be competing in tier 3 west of the Five Nations Roller Derby tournament.

== League Structure ==
The league consists of four teams:

- Valkyries (A, WFTDA-aligned, formed 2022)
- CheckerBroads (A, WFTDA-aligned, formed October 2010 - Retired in 2019)
- New Wheeled Order (A, MRDA-aligned, formed December 2011)
- Furies (B, WFTDA-aligned, formed 2012)
- Chaos Engine (B, MRDA-aligned, formed 2013)

The league has a skater induction program, called Zero 2 Hero, to teach the skills needed for playing roller derby.

== Affiliation ==
In December 2012, MRD was accepted as one of the first three non-American members of the Men's Roller Derby Association. The league became a member of the United Kingdom Roller Derby Association in November 2013. MRD league members have expressed interest in being affiliated with the Women's Flat Track Derby Association, but the league did not meet the WFTDA membership requirements due to it being a co-ed league consisting of both women and men until 2020. The Valkyries have been a WFTDA team since September 2020

Preceded by New competition	British Roller Derby Championships Men's Tier 2 Champions; 2015	Succeeded by Incumbent
