= Puget Sound Outcast Derby =

Roller derby league

- Metro area: Seattle, Washington
- Country: United States
- Track type: Flat
- Venue: Everett Skate Deck
- Affiliations: MRDA
- Website: outcastderby.org

Puget Sound Outcast Derby (PSOD) is a men's roller derby league based in Seattle, Washington. The league was founded in 2007 by Chuck“Hollywood Hendrick, and consists of a two teams, The Puget Sound Outcasts and the Puget Sound Castaways which plays teams from other leagues.

For Puget Sound's first two years, they primarily exhibited their skills during the half-time break in bouts by local women's leagues. In 2008, they organised "Throwdown in the Sound", described by the Derby News Network as "the first serious attempt at a men's flat-track tournament".

By 2009, they engaged with the Men's Derby Coalition, then consisting entirely of leagues on the east coast of the United States. They joined in July 2010, becoming the coalition's fifth league.

The Coalition subsequently became the Men's Roller Derby Association (MRDA), and Puget Sound were seeded fourth for their 2011 Championship. However, they defeated top seeds the St. Louis GateKeepers to reach the final, where they lost narrowly to the New York Shock Exchange.

Notable Puget Sound skaters included Rat City Rollergirls coaches "Quadzilla L.K." and Dylan Botts.
