= Green Bay Smackers =

Roller derby league

- Country: United States
- Founded: 2010
- Track type: Flat
- Venues: St. Marys Roller Rink, Green Bay, Wisconsin; Skaters Edge, Appleton, Wisconsin; Cornerstone Community Center, De Pere, Wisconsin
- Website: www.gbsmackers.com

The Green Bay Smackers are a men's roller derby league, based in Green Bay, Wisconsin. The league consists of a single interleague team.

Founded in 2010 by Paper Valley Roller Girls coach Attractive Nuisance, the league has been working on both their roller skating abilities and their after party antics. On July 25, 2012 the league was accepted into the Men's Roller Derby Association.
