= Cedar Rapids RollerGirls =

Roller derby league

- Metro area: Cedar Rapids, IA
- Country: United States
- Founded: 2008
- Teams: Five Season Femme Fatales (A team); Brutal Belles (B team)
- Track type(s): Flat
- Venue: Veterans Memorial Stadium
- Affiliations: WFTDA
- Website: crrollergirls.com

Cedar Rapids RollerGirls (CRRG) is a women's flat track roller derby league based in Cedar Rapids, Iowa. Founded in 2008, Cedar Rapids is a member of the Women's Flat Track Derby Association (WFTDA).

== History and organization ==
The league was founded early in 2008 by Andrea Clay, known as "Motley Cruel". Clay had just moved to the city, having previously played for the Bleeding Heartland Rollergirls. The league played its first bout in October, drawing a crowd of more than 1,800 fans.

The league separated from owners and became completely league ran and operated by its members in January 2012.

Several skaters from the league participated in the making of the "Iowa Gurls" music video, a popular local parody of "California Gurls".

Cedar Rapids was accepted as a member of the Women's Flat Track Derby Association Apprentice Program in January 2012, and became a full member of the WFTDA in September 2013.

The league consists of two teams which compete against teams from other leagues. The Five Season Femme Fatales are the chartered team of CRRG and are able to be ranked against other WFTDA chartered teams. The Brutal Belles is the league's B team.

== WFTDA rankings ==
Season	Final ranking	Playoffs	Championship
2014	150 WFTDA	DNQ	DNQ
2015	205 WFTDA	DNQ	DNQ
2016	279 WFTDA	DNQ	DNQ
2017	284 WFTDA	DNQ	DNQ
