= Power of Scotland =

Power of Scotland – Team Scotland Men's Roller Derby
- Colors: Blue and white
- Head coach: Venus Velocity & Ginge
- Manager: Mona Rampage
- Championships: 7th place at Men's Roller Derby World Cup
- Website: www.facebook.com/PowerOfScotland

Power of Scotland: Team Scotland Men's Roller Derby represents Scotland in men's international Roller Derby in events such as the Men's Roller Derby World Cup. The team was founded in 2013 to compete in the 2014 Men's Roller Derby World Cup in Birmingham where they finished the tournament in joint 7th place.

== 2014 Men's Roller Derby World Cup ==
Power of Scotland competed in the inaugural Men's Roller Derby World Cup, held at the Futsal Arena, Birmingham, UK, 14–16 March 2014.

During the group stage on the first day of the tournament the team competed in the Orange Group against Ninjapan Rollers (PoS 247 – 73 NR), Team Belgium (PoS 98 – 82 TB) and Team Canada (PoS 18 – 220 TC). Power of Scotland finished 2nd in the group securing themselves a quarter final place in the knockout stages.

On the second day of the tournament Power of Scotland faced Team USA in the quarter-finals eventually losing the bout 557–40. Having been knocked out of the main title competition the team returned on Day 3 to compete in the Plate bracket, facing off against Team Wales. The final score was Power of Scotland 123 – 245 Team Wales, signalling the end of the team's involvement in the competition.

== Roster ==
The 2014 roster for Power of Scotland selected for the 2014 Men's Roller Derby World Cup

=== Players ===
Number	Name	League(s)
iq0	Dafty	Jakey Bites/Capital City Roller Derby
1ve	Alottablackenblue	Mean City Roller Derby
101	Pudsey	Granite City Brawlermen
1664	Konanbourg	Jakey Bites/Mean City Roller Derby
18	Tequila Jammer	Jakey Bites/Capital City Roller Derby
19	JudderJam	Jakey Bites
1998	Tea-Virus	Jakey Bites/Mean City Roller Derby
2212	Whyte & MacDie	Mean City Roller Derby
2d	Nuke Jukem	The Quads of War: Milton Keynes Roller Derby
39	Duff	Jakey Bites
42	Dead Hardy	Bairn City Rollers
5	Dreads	Bairn City Rollers
57	Jaffa Skates	Granite City Brawlermen
67	iHorror	Bairn City Rollers
SR71	zero	Mean City Roller Derby
8	Porky the Penetrator	Tyne & Fear Roller Derby
802	rEd Baron	Jakey Bites/Bairn City Rollers
9	WKDeid	Jakey Bites/Capital City Roller Derby
976	The Real Scrim Shady	Bairn City Rollers
999	The Philth	Tyne & Fear Roller Derby

=== Management Team ===
Role	Name	League
Bench Manager/head coach	Venus Velocity	Glasgow Roller Derby
Line-Up Manager/Assistant Coach	Ginge	Auld Reekie Roller Girls
Team manager	Mona Rampage	Glasgow Roller Derby
Team physio	Goldginger	Dundee Roller Derby
Tournament Liaison	Natcho	Glasgow Roller Derby
Support staff	Five Star Sylk	Glasgow Roller Derby
