= Roller Derby Toulouse =

Roller derby league

- Metro area: Toulouse
- Country: France
- Founded: 2010
- Teams: All-Stars Nothing Toulouse (Women+ A team); La Panthera (Women+ B team); Rainbow Furies (Women+ C team); Quad Guards (M+/Open A team)
- Track type: Flat
- Website: www.rollerderbytoulouse.com

Roller Derby Toulouse is a roller derby league based in Toulouse, France. Founded in 2010, the league currently consists of two men's teams, three women's teams and one junior team.

The league was founded in February 2010 by Chakk Attakk, following the release of Whip It! in France (under the title Bliss). Having skating experience, she recruited the first five women through the Roulez Rose website. In mid-2010, six skaters from the league competed against Les Petits Morts de Bordeaux in the first flat track roller derby bout held in France.

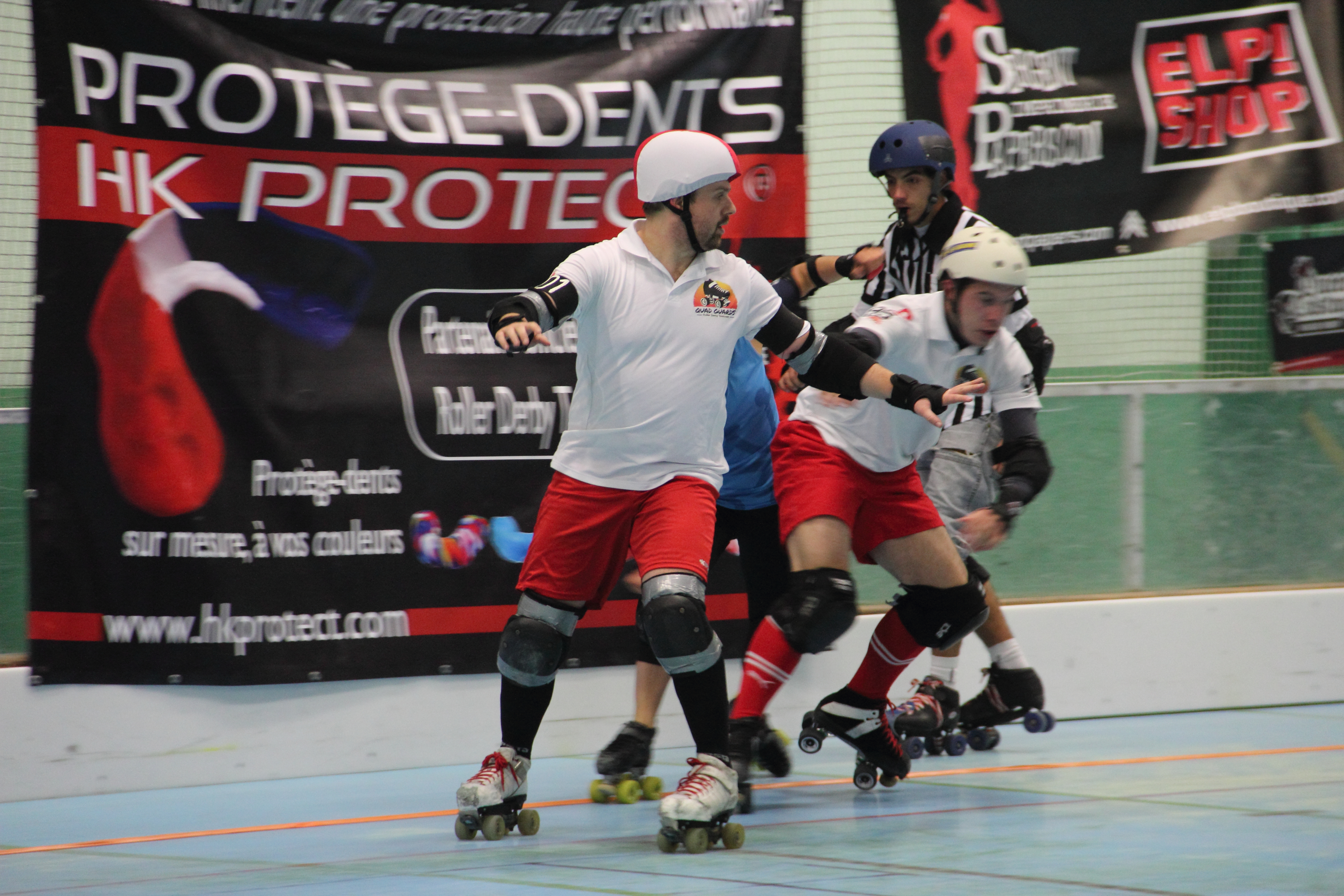
The Quad Guards

By November 2011, the league had 83 skaters, and had created the first men's roller derby team in France. The men's team, the Quad Guards, travelled to London to play Southern Discomfort, in what that team described as "the first international men's roller derby game in the UK". In May 2012, it played the first men's roller derby bout in France, against The Inhuman League from Sheffield in England.

Five skaters from the league were selected to skate for France at the 2011 Roller Derby World Cup.

In December 2013, the Quad Guards were accepted as members of the Men's Roller Derby Association.

== Awards ==
2012 : Vice European champions MERDC in 2012 (Final against Southern Discomfort (London)).

2013 : European champions MERDC in 2013 (Final against Southern Discomfort (London)).

2015-2016 : French champions

2016-2017 : French champions

Preceded by Southern Discomfort Roller Derby	Men's European Roller Derby Championship Winners; 2013	Succeeded by Southern Discomfort Roller Derby
