= Portland Men's Roller Derby =

Roller derby league

- Metro area: Portland, Oregon
- Country: United States
- Founded: 2009
- Track type: Flat
- Venue: Oaks Park Hangar
- Affiliations: MRDA
- Website: Portland Men's Roller Derby

Portland Men's Roller Derby is an open gender flat track roller derby league in Portland, Oregon, United States. The league was established in 2009. In May 2011, The Oregonian reported, "Eventually the Rose City Rollers --the women's league --agreed to lease space to the men at their home base, the Hangar at Oaks Amusement Park in Southeast Portland."

In August 2011, Portland Men's Roller Derby held tryouts for "exceptionally violent skaters of all skill levels" at the Oaks Park hangar, "sometimes in co-ed scrimmages with roller girls".

In December 2011, the league was accepted as a member of the Men's Roller Derby Association. Their first home game after that membership was in Beaverton, on May 26, 2012, with "Holy Roll'n Empire bumping skates against the Bone Daddies".

Benjamin Doyle, a founding member of Portland Men's Roller Derby, was hired in 2020 as director of live broadcast operations.
