= Magic City Misfits =

Roller derby league

- Metro area: Jacksonville, FL
- Country: United States
- Founded: 2009
- Teams: Misfits (A team); Mayhem (B team)
- Track type(s): Flat
- Venue: Skate Station Funworks
- Affiliations: MRDA
- Website: mrda.org/team/magic-city-misfits/

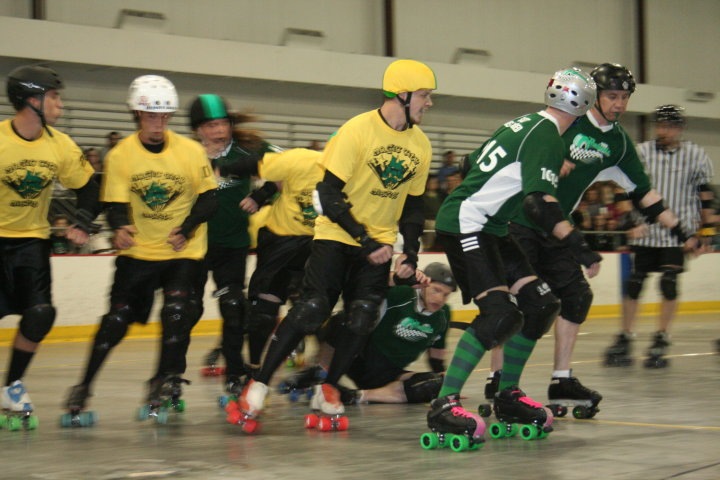
The Misfits playing in 2010

The Magic City Misfits (MCM) is a roller derby league based in Jacksonville, Florida. Founded in 2009, it consists of two teams, which play against teams from other leagues.

The league was formed by a group of male jam skaters in April 2009, and joined the Men's Derby Coalition in September 2010. From September 2010 to October 2012, the Misfits lost only a single game, to the New York Shock Exchange at the 2011 Championships of the renamed Men's Roller Derby Association (MRDA). The team placed third in that tournament, and during 2012 set a new record by scoring 617 points in an MRDA bout. At the 2012 Championships, Magic City took fourth place, losing narrowly to Shock Exchange in their final match.

Members of the Misfits have also been involved in local women's roller derby, including Tim Kugler, who coached the Ocala Cannibals Roller Derby.
