= Varsity Derby League =

Roller derby league

- Metro area: Canberra, Australian Capital Territory
- Country: Australia
- Founded: 2011
- Teams: DisHonour Rollers (Women) Rogue Scholars (Women) Capital Carnage (Men) Smackademics (Mixed)
- Track type(s): Flat
- Venue: Southern Cross Stadium, Tuggeranong
- Website: varsityderbyleague.com

Varsity Derby League (formerly known as ANU Roller Derby) is a roller derby league based in the Australian Capital Territory. VDL is Canberra's only gender inclusive league, allowing both men and women to participate in the sport of roller derby.

== History ==
In 2011, Canberran student roller derby enthusiasts worked on starting a new league, ANU Roller Derby League, as a student organisation at Australian National University. In mid-2011 the league officially changed its name to 'Varsity Derby League' (VDL). In August 2011, VDL incorporated as an independent Association.

VDL currently has two representative women's teams, the DisHonour Rollers (DHRs) and the Rogue Scholars.

In May 2013, VDL became the first Canberran roller derby league to train skaters of any gender as players. In 2014, VDL established Canberra's first (and only) men's team, Capital Carnage. With the inclusion of men in the league, VDL has also formed a mixed-gender team, The Smackademics, to compete against other mixed teams in tournaments and friendly games.

In 2016, the DisHonour Rollers took top honours in the A-Division of the Eastern Region Roller Derby championships, while the Rogue Scholars brought home the trophy for the B-Division, thus marking the first time in the event's history for teams of the same league to take home the trophy in both Divisions.

In April 2017, VDL became a Mens Roller Derby Association (MRDA)-affiliated league and Capital Carnage competed in their first ever MRDA tournament, MRDA Down Under. Capital Carnage is keenly awaiting the quarterly MRDA ranking list to be released, where they anticipate being ranked somewhere around 45th in the world.

== Teams ==
Varsity Derby League currently fields a total of four teams.

VDL's women's A representative team is the DisHonour Rollers and were the league's first representative team forming in 2011.

VDL now has a second women's B team, The Rogue Scholars, formed in 2015.

The men's team, Capital Carnage, formed in 2014.

Varsity also has a mixed gender team, featuring players of all genders represented in the league, called the Smackademics, formed in 2015.

VDL previously had two (women's) home teams, The PhDemons, whose colours were purple and black, and the Cheerbleeders, who skated in red and gold. In 2013 the decision was made by the league to focus on the representative team and playing inter-league bouts.

== Logos and Uniforms ==
Capital Carnage logo

The Rogue Scholars logo

The Smackademics logo

All four Varsity Derby League teams have their own coloured uniform with the DisHonour Rollers skating in grey, The Rogue Scholars in green, Capital Carnage in pink and The Smackademics in purple. All four teams have a red uniform as their alternate strip.

== Skaters ==
Name	Number	Team
Blocktopussy	007	DisHonour Rollers and Smackademics
Jo Dirt	08	DisHonour Rollers and Smackademics (Vice-Captain)
Diazeslam	10	DisHonour Rollers
Jamme Slamister	15	Capital Carnage and Smackademics
Red Hot Jillie Pepper	23	DisHonour Rollers and Smackademics
Ginja Ail	375	DisHonour Rollers and Smackademics
The Cleaver	43	DisHonour Rollers
TerrorSmackdal	666	DisHonour Rollers
Spanky	18	DisHonour Rollers
Edu-Hater	182	DisHonour Rollers
Hot Mess	19	DisHonour Rollers
Bobby Smack	44	Capital Carnage
Thuggernaut	04	Capital Carnage and Smackademics
Astroboyd	643	Capital Carnage and Smackademics (Captain)
Leo Slayer	61	Capital Carnage and Smackademics
Cliff Hanger	1101	Capital Carnage
Ewrectile Destruction	2	Capital Carnage
Pension Check	1878	Capital Carnage
Copter	643	Capital Carnage (Co-Captain) and Smackademics
David Deck'em	777	Capital Carnage and Smackademics
Pins and Needes	222	DisHonour Rollers
Hot Blox	420	Rogue Scholars
Hell Yeh	129	Rogue Scholars
Half Bloody Princess	489	Rogue Scholars
Irish Upon a Star	9	Rogue Scholars and Smackademics
CrossWencher	99	Rogue Scholars

== Officials ==
The league's referees, also known as "team zebra", is made up of a mixture of full-time referees and drafted skaters who also referee. Denominator is the League's current Head Referee.

The League's non-skating officials (NSOs) are volunteer officials involved in all officiating roles not assigned as on-skates positions. This includes penalty-timing, lineup-tracking and score-keeping. Leo Slayer is the League's current Head NSO.

== See also ==
- List of roller derby leagues
