= Harm City Roller Derby =

Roller derby league

- Metro area: Baltimore
- Country: United States
- Founded: 2007
- Dissolved: 2020
- Teams: Travel Team; Harm City Homicide (Baltimore); Rollin' Regulators (Cecil County); Khaos (Frederick)
- Track type(s): Flat
- Venue: Putty Hill Skateland, Baltimore
- Affiliations: MRDA

The Harm City Roller Derby (HCRD) is a men's roller derby league, based in Baltimore. The league consists of four teams—an interleague team and three intra-league teams.

Harm City Homicide was one of the first men's derby teams in the county, founded by Charm City Roller Girls referee Justice Feelgood Marshall in 2007. Harm City Homicide played the first men's full-length bout with WFTDA rules against the New York Shock Exchange in 2008.

Harm City Homicide is a founding member of the Men's Roller Derby Association (formerly the Men’s Derby Coalition). In 2010, the team participated in the first-ever official men’s roller derby season and hosted that year’s championship, taking 3rd place overall.

In 2012, the league was restructured, joining with a newly created team serving Cecil County, Maryland, the Rollin' Regulators, which had been founded in 2011 by a Harm City Homicide skater. Harm City Homicide and the Rollin' Regulators now serve as two intraleague, regional teams, with members from each team chosen for the travel team. Later that year, a new team serving Frederick, Maryland, Khaos, also joined.

Harm City has not uploaded anything to social media since 2020 and their webpage no longer exists. The MRDA website has the league labeled as 'disbanded.'
