= Your Mom Men's Derby =

Roller derby league

- Metro area: Des Moines, IA
- Country: United States
- Founded: 2010
- Dissolved: 2020
- Track type: Flat
- Venue: Skate West
- Affiliations: Men's Roller Derby Association

Your Mom Men's Derby (YMMD) was a men's roller derby league based in Des Moines. It consisted of a single team, which plays against teams from other leagues.

Your Mom joined the Men's Roller Derby Association (MRDA) in June 2011, and narrowly missed out on qualifying for that year's MRDA Championships.

The team played at the Spring Roll tournament early in 2012, where it surprisingly beat the top-ranked team, New York Shock Exchange. As a result, Your Mom were ranked number one for the 2012 MRDA Championships, and won the tournament, beating the St. Louis GateKeepers by a single point in the final. In honor of the win, the Mayor of Des Moines declared December 8 to be "Your Mom Men's Roller Derby Day". In celebration, the team played a bout against all-star team of women skaters from the Mid West, calling themselves "That's What She Said".

The team disbanded in 2020 with no official public statement but are no longer affiliated with the Men's Roller Derby Association.

Preceded by New York Shock Exchange	Men's Roller Derby Association Championship Winners; 2012 – 2014	Succeeded by St. Louis GateKeepers
