= St. Louis GateKeepers =

Roller derby league

- Metro area: St. Louis, Missouri
- Country: United States
- Founded: November 2009
- Teams: GateKeepers Travel Team; Creve Coroners; Central West Friends; Raiders of Forest Park; B-Keepers
- Track type(s): Flat
- Venue: various
- Affiliations: MRDA (Men's Roller Derby Association)
- Org. type: skater-owned
- Website: gatekeepersrollerderby.com

The St. Louis GateKeepers are an open gender flat-track roller derby team based in St. Louis, Missouri. It was founded in November 2009 by Magnum, p.i.m.p. (Scott Meyer), a referee for the Arch Rival Rollergirls, and Bat Wing (Evan Jones). Since then, the league has grown to support two touring travel teams (the main travel team and the B-Keepers, the travelling B-team) and three local teams: The Creve Coroners, The Central West Friends, and the Raiders of Forest Park.

== History ==
The St. Louis GateKeepers were conceived by Scott Meyer (who skates under the name Magnum p.i.m.p.) and Evan Jones (Bat Wing) on the way from a men's roller derby bout in Sioux City. Together, they started the GateKeepers in November 2009. Since then, the league has grown from starting with only a few players to a roster that includes over 40 skaters. The GateKeepers won the Men's Roller Derby Association World Championship in 2015.

=== Spring Roll 2011 ===
The St. Louis GateKeepers received considerable attention for their performance at the 2011 Spring Roll tournament hosted in Fort Wayne, Indiana. Despite being a relatively young team, the GateKeepers were undefeated in the tournament. Notably, the GateKeepers beat the high-ranking Puget Sound Outcasts and broke the 24-game winning streak of the previously undefeated New York Shock Exchange.

== Local League Structure ==
The St. Louis GateKeepers consists of three local teams, each named after a St. Louis neighborhood. The teams are The South Grand Slammers, The Riverfront Crimes, and the Dogtown Rockets, and are named after the South Grand Avenue district, the Riverfront area, and Dogtown, respectively. The teams practice together at regular practices, but bout against each other in a series of matches deemed 'Turf Wars', culminating in a yearly championship. The league is entirely skater-run, with the players helping to run the teams, referee the local bouts and pay for rink time.

== 2011 Schedule ==
=== Intraleague Schedule ===
March 26 - South Grand Slammers vs. Riverfront Crimes
April 16 - Dogtown Red Rockets vs. South Grand Slammers
May 21 - Riverfront Crimes vs. Dogtown Red Rockets
June 18 - South Grand Slammers vs. Riverfront Crimes
July 23 - Dogtown Red Rockets vs. South Grand Slammers
Aug 20th - Riverfront Crimes vs. Dogtown Red Rockets
Sept 17th - Turf War Championship

=== Interleague Travel Team Schedule ===
| Date | St. Louis GateKeepers vs. | Location | St. Louis GateKeepers | Opposing Team |
|---|---|---|---|---|
| 02/05/11 | Race City Rebels | Indianapolis, IN | 213 | 63 |
| 05/14/11 | Puget Sound Outcast | Ft. Wayne, IN (Spring Roll Tournament) | 201 | 78 |
| 05/15/11 | Harm City Homicide | Ft. Wayne, IN (Spring Roll Tournament) | 261 | 56 |
| 05/15/11 | New York Shock Exchange | Ft. Wayne, IN (Spring Roll Tournament) | 158 | 138 |
| 05/29/11 | Ozarks Derby Brigade* | Springfield, MO | 348 | 35 |
| 06/11/11 | Twin Cites Terrors | St. Louis, MO | 207 | 43 |
| 07/09/11 | Ozarks Derby Brigade* | St. Peters, MO | 272 | 71 |
| 08/27/11 | Des Moines | Des Moines, IA | 159 | 116 |
| 10/22/11 | Puget Sound Outcast | New York, NY (MRDA Championship) | 106 | 127 |
| 10/22/11 | Magic City Misfits | New York, NY (MRDA Championship) | 145 | 170 |

* B-Keepers Game

== 2010 Season Interleague Stats ==
| Date | St. Louis GateKeepers vs. | Location | St. Louis GateKeepers | Opposing Team |
|---|---|---|---|---|
| 03/20/2010 | Race City Rebels | St. Louis, MO | 125 | 17 |
| 05/08/2010 | Twin City Terrors | Fort Wayne, IN | 49 | 35 |
| 05/08/2010 | Dallas Deception | Fort Wayne, IN | 43 | 40 |
| 05/08/2010 | Puget Sound Outcast | Fort Wayne, IN | 120 | 121 |
| 06/12/2010 | Race City Rebels | Indianapolis, IN | 226 | 68 |
| 08/21/2010 | Twin City Terrors | Lakeville, MN | 144 | 93 |
| 09/26/2010 | Magic City Misfits | Fayetteville, AR | 170 | 143 |
| 02/05/2011 | Race City Rebels | Indianapolis, IN | 213 | 63 |

| Preceded by Your Mom Men's Derby | Men's Roller Derby Association Championship Winners; 2015 – 2017 | Succeeded by Current champions |
