= Men's Roller Derby Association =

International governing body of men's flat track roller derby

- Sport: Roller derby
- Founded: 2007 (as Men's Derby Coalition)
- Country: Australia; Belgium; Canada; England; Finland; France; Mexico; Scotland; Sweden; United States; Wales
- Most recent champion: St. Louis GateKeepers
- Most titles: St. Louis GateKeepers (5)
- Website: www.mrda.org

The Men's Roller Derby Association (MRDA) is the international governing body of men's flat track roller derby. It was founded in 2007 under the name Men's Derby Coalition (renamed to Men's Roller Derby Association in 2011), and currently has 59 open gender leagues under its jurisdiction. MRDA member leagues play using the rules of Flat-Track Roller Derby originally designed by the WFTDA.

== Member leagues ==
The association has 55 active member leagues:

League	Metro area	Admitted	Notes
Terminus Roller Derby	Atlanta, GA	22 February 2017	Formerly known as Atlanta Men's Roller Derby
Austin Anarchy	Austin, TX	19 February 2015	
Barrow Infernos	Barrow-in-Furness, UK	13 August 2014	
Bridgetown Roller Derby	Portland, OR	20 December 2011	Travel team known as Bridgetown Menace.; formerly known and "Portland Men's Roller Derby"
Brisbane City Rollers	Brisbane, QLD	29 June 2015	
Capital City Derby Doods	Ottawa		
Capital City Hooligans	Springfield, IL	24 February 2014	
Capital District Trauma Authority	Albany, NY	27 January 2012	
Carolina Wreckingballs	Columbia, SC	7 July 2012	
Casco Bay Roller Derby	Portland, ME	1 March 2016	
Chicago Bruise Brothers	Chicago, IL	8 October 2013	
Chinhook City Roller Derby	Calgary, AB	8 October 2013	
Cincinnati Battering Rams	Cincinnati, OH	12 October 2013	
Cleveland Guardians Roller Derby	Cleveland, OH	20 March 2016	Formerly known as Cleveland Men's Roller Derby
Collision Men's Derby	Raleigh, NC	22 February 2014	
Crash Test Brummies	Birmingham, UK	20 May 2015	
Dakota Men's Roller Derby	Fargo, ND	23 June 2011	
Denver Ground Control	Denver, CO	5 March 2015	
Detroit Men's Roller Derby	Detroit, MI	6 July 2016	
Disorder	Mexico City, Mexico	25 April 2023	
East Anglo Smacksons	Norfolk, England		
East Midlands Open Roller Derby	Nottingham, England	16 September 2015	Formerly known as "Nottingham Roller Derby" with the team called "Super Smash Brollers;" abbreviated as EMORD.
Flour City Fear	Rochester, NY	31 January 2017	
Golden State Heat	Los Angeles, CA	24 December 2012	formerly known as "Drive-By City Rollers"
Glasgow Men's Roller Derby	Glasgow, Scotland		
Granite City Brawlers	Aberdeen, Scotland	11 August 2017	
Helsinki Coast Quads	Helsinki, Finland	29 May 2019	
Houston Men's Derby	Houston, TX	26 October 2017	
Inhuman League, The	Sheffield, England	8 October 2013	
Kansas City Slaughter	Kansas City, MO	22 December 2014	formerly Oklahoma Men's Roller Derby and Formerly OKC Wolfpack
Kent Men's Roller Derby	Kent, England	14 October 2019	
Concussion Roller Derby	Eugene, OR	11 February 2012	Formerly known as Lane County Concussion
Magic City Misfits	Jacksonville, FL	1 September 2010	
Manchester Roller Derby	Manchester, England	20 December 2012	New Wheeled Order (travel team) and Chaos Engine
Manneken Beasts	Brussels, Belgium	6 July 2016	
Minnesota Men's Roller Derby	Minneapolis-St. Paul, MN	25 October 2010	Twin Cities Terrors (travel team)
Mohawk Valley Roller Derby	Rome, NY	27 June 2011	Formerly known as the Quad Fathers
Montréal Men's Roller Derby	Montreal, QC	13 December 2012	Mont Royals (travel team), La Poutine de Montréal
New Orleans Brass Roller Derby	New Orleans, LA	10 May 2016	
Panam Squad	Paris, France	20 May 2015	
Philadelphia Hooligans	Philadelphia, PA	24 June 2014	Affiliate of Penn Jersey Roller Derby
Pioneer Valley Roller Derby	Northampton, MA	November 2007	PVRD also has two women's teams and an all-gender/no-gender team
Puget Sound Outcast Derby	Seattle, WA	5 July 2010	Membership is from the greater Puget Sound area of Washington state
Race City Rebels	Indianapolis, IN	10 September 2010	
San Diego Aftershocks	San Diego, CA	22 December 2014	
St. Louis GateKeepers	St. Louis, MO	10 September 2010	
Skaters Grimm, The	Antioch, CA		
South Wales Silures	Cardiff, UK	24 June 2014	
Texas Men's Roller Derby	Denton, TX	26 January 2014	Formerly the Denton County Outlaws; Formerly Texas Outlaws
Toronto Men's Roller Derby	Toronto, ON	19 February 2015	
Tyne and Fear Roller Derby	Newcastle-upon-Tyne, England	8 October 2013	
Vancouver Murder	Vancouver, BC	15 November 2014	
Varsity Derby League	Canberra, Australia	14 April 2017	
Wirral Roller Derby- Pack Animals	Wirral, England	1 December 2016	
Wisconsin United Roller Derby	Madison, WI	20 December 2012	Formerly known as Milwaukee Blitzdkrieg and Wisconsin Men's Roller Derby

Inactive Leagues:

League	Metro area	Admitted	Notes
Arizona Men's Derby	Phoenix, AZ	25 July 2012	
Big O Roller Bros	Omaha, NE	12 October 2013	
Bisman Bomberz	Bismarck, ND		
Bototos Bandidos	Vina del Mar, Chile	24 October 2018	
Connecticut Death Quads	Waterbury, CT	2008	
Cowtown Butchers	Kansas City, MO	4 August 2011	
Derby Club Le Cres Lattes Montpellier	Montpellier, France	26 September 2017	Often called "Kamiquadz"
D.H.R. Men's Roller Derby	Kiel, Germany	2020	
Green Bay Smackers	Green Bay, WI	25 July 2012	
Harm City Men's Derby	Baltimore, MD	November 2007	formerly known as "Harm City Roller Derby"
Hitmen of Manatee County	Sarasota, FL	16 July 2013	
Les Nordiks de Touraine	Tours, France		Team known as Track'Association
Light City Derby	Australia		
Lincolnshire Rolling Thunder	Lincoln, England	16 July 2014	
Jersey Boys Roller Derby	Springfield, NJ		
MadRiders Men's Roller Derby	Madrid, Spain	2 June 2019	
Mass Maelstrom Roller Derby	Lancaster, MA	25 October 2010	
Men's Roller Derby Japan	Tokyo, Japan	11 August 2017	usually known as "Ninjapan"
Milton Keynes Quads of War	Milton Keynes, UK		
Mountain State Cutthroat Mafia	Salt Lake City, UT	16 July 2013	Formerly known as "Uinta Madness"
New York Shock Exchange	New York, NY	November 2007	
North Wales Roller Derby	Maes Hyfryd, Flint, Wales	24 October 2018	
Orcet Roller Derby	Orcet, France	2 June 2019	
Ottawa Slaughter Squad	Ottawa, ON		
Pittsburgh Blue Streaks	Pittsburgh, PA	6 March 2017	
Red Deer Dreadnaughts	Red Deer, AB	1 December 2013	
Rock City Riot	Fargo-Moorhead, ND	27 June 2011	
Roller Derby Toulouse	Toulouse, France	4 November 2013	Team known as Quad Guards
Sioux City Korn Stalkers	Sioux City, IA	11 July 2011	
Southern Discomfort Roller Derby	London, UK	20 December 2012	
Star City Offense	Salem, OR		
Sydney City SMASH	Sydney, NSW	5 March 2015	
Tampa Bay Men's Roller Derby	Tampa Bay, FL	16 July 2012	
Tampere Rollin' Bros	Tampere, Finland	4 December 2015	
Thunderquads Roller Derby Masculino	Buenos Aires, Argentina		
Tulsa Derby Militia	Tulsa, OK	1 December 2013	
Vermont Men's Roller Derby	Burlington, VT	3 October 2011	Formerly the Burlington Bomb Quads
Victoria Men's Roller Derby	Melbourne, Australia	26 August 2016	
West Swedish Roller Derby Society (VSRDS)	Gothenburg, Sweden	16 June 2016	
Wheels of Mayhem	Mexicali, Mexico	23 August 2016	
Your Mom Men's Derby	Des Moines, IA	15 June 2011	-

== Championships ==
The MRDA-organized annual championships:

Year	Date	Venue	Champion	Second	Third
2010	17 October	Hagerstown, Maryland	New York Shock Exchange	Pioneer Valley Dirty Dozen	Harm City Homicide
2011	22 October	Old Bethpage, New York	New York Shock Exchange	Puget Sound Outcast Derby	Magic City Misfits
2012	20–21 October	Ballwin, Missouri	Your Mom Men's Derby	St. Louis GateKeepers	New York Shock Exchange
2013	19–20 October	Sioux City, Iowa	Your Mom Men's Derby	New York Shock Exchange	St. Louis GateKeepers
2014	19–20 October	Seattle, Washington	Your Mom Men's Derby	St. Louis GateKeepers	New York Shock Exchange
2015	17–18 October	St. Louis, Missouri	St. Louis GateKeepers	Your Mom Men's Derby	Texas Men's Roller Derby
2016	15–16 October	Dallas, Texas	St. Louis GateKeepers	Your Mom Men's Derby	Texas Men's Roller Derby
2017	13–15 October	Cwmbran, Wales	St. Louis GateKeepers	Bridgetown Menace	San Diego Aftershocks
2018	12-14 October	Salem, Oregon	St. Louis GateKeepers	Portland Men's Roller Derby	Roller Derby Toulouse
2019	11–13 October	Denver, Colorado	St. Louis GateKeepers	Magic City Misfits	Texas Men's Roller Derby
2024	11–13 October	Newcastle upon Tyne, England	St. Louis GateKeepers	Denver Ground Control	Magic City Misfits

The Men's Derby Coalition (the MRDA's former name) held its first Championship on 17 October 2010, with New York Shock Exchange defeating the Pioneer Valley Dirty Dozen in the final.

The second installment (and the first to be held under the MRDA name) was held on 22 October 2011 and featured the six top-ranked men's leagues. New York Shock Exchange managed to defend their title with a narrow win over Puget Sound Outcast Derby.

At the 2012 Championships, Your Mom Men's Derby beat St. Louis by a single point (136–135) in the final, despite having trailed for almost the entire bout.

Your Mom Men's Derby won again at the 2013 tournament by a larger margin, beating New York 249 to 130 in the final. Your Mom Men's Derby went on to win the 2014 final by beating St. Louis GateKeepers.

The 2015 Championship was especially notable, as it was the first time a team from outside the USA participated (Southern Discomfort Roller Derby from London, England, UK). The final once again saw Your Mom Men's Derby vs. the St. Louis GateKeepers. The GateKeepers won by a score of 188 to 121.

The St. Louis Gatekeepers kept up the momentum and won the MRDA Championship title four more times: 2016 (against Your Mom Men's Roller Derby 165-129), 2017 (against Bridgetown Menace 181-156), 2018 (again, against Bridgetown Menace 162–150), and 2019 (against the Magic City Misfits 154-117). 2018 the first year a team from outside the USA (Roller Derby Toulouse) won Bronze at the Championships.

The MRDA suspended post-season activity from 2020-2022 due to the COVID-19 pandemic. Post-season resumed in 2023 with the Western Hemisphere Cup, and the usual post-season (qualifiers and championships) were once again held in 2024, with the St Louis Gatekeepers claiming their sixth MRDA Championship title (against Denver Ground Control 146-129).

The 2025 MRDA Championships took place in Salem, Oregon from October 10-12th.
