= New York Shock Exchange =

Roller derby league

- Metro area: New York
- Country: United States
- Founded: 2006
- Teams: Travel Team; Dow Jones Average (B-team); Coney Island Freakshow (intraleague); Greenwich Villains (intraleague); Union Squares (intraleague)
- Track type: Flat
- Venue: Skate Safe America, Old Bethpage, New York
- Website: www.nyshockexchange.com

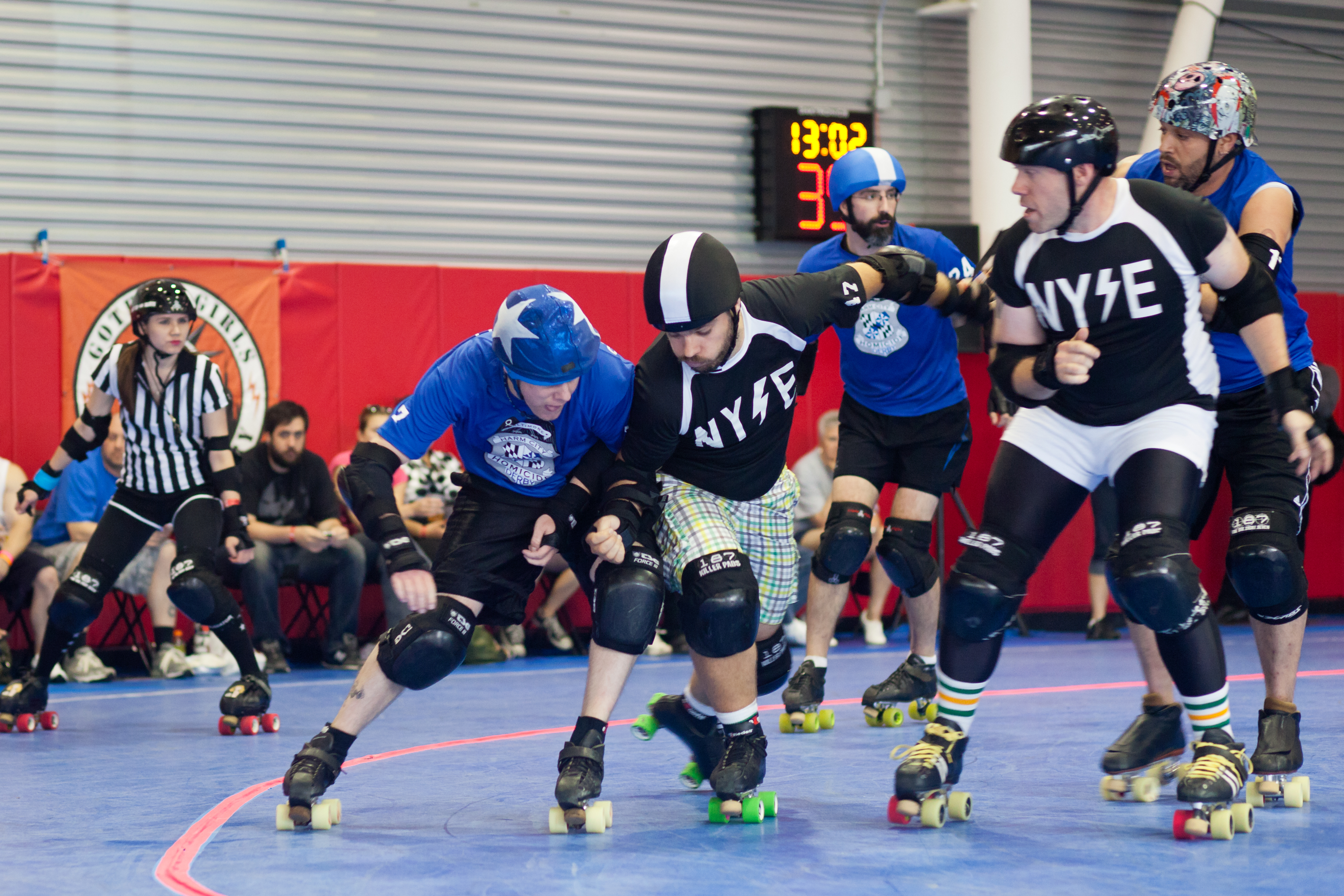
New York Shock Exchange (in black) take on Harm City Homicide (in blue) in August 2011

The New York Shock Exchange (NYSE) is a men's roller derby league, based in New York City. The league consists of four teams, two interleague teams and three intra-league teams.

The league was founded by Gotham Girls Roller Derby coach Jonathan R in 2006. He organized a bout against from Pioneer Valley Roller Derby and quickly gathered a team which won 109-51 in April 2007. Later in the year, both leagues were founder members of the Men's Derby Coalition (MDC). They went on to win their first 23 bouts, including the 2010 MDC Championships, before finally succumbing to the St Louis GateKeepers at the Spring Roll tournament in early 2011. In late 2010, National Public Radio described the Shock Exchange squad as "quite possibly the strongest men's roller derby team in the country".

During 2011, the Shock Exchange organized its bouts as doubleheaders with the women's league, the Long Island Roller Rebels, in Old Bethpage, New York. The Men's Derby Coalition became the Men's Roller Derby Association (MRDA), and Shock Exchange hosted the 2011 MRDA Championships at the venue, successfully defending their title.

In 2012, a New York Shock Exchange travel team played in the first modern intercontinental men's roller derby game as part of its "Shock the UK" tour of England.

In 2015, the New York Shock Exchange made a history again by becoming the first men's roller derby league to send a travel team from the US to Australia and play in multiple games as part of its "Shock Down Under" tour.

Preceded by New tournament	Men's Roller Derby Association Championship Winners; 2010 – 2011	Succeeded by Your Mom Men's Derby
