= List of roller derby associations =

Roller derby is governed by associations that cover different types of derby. Outside the United States, national associations exist, or derby is recognised and supported by the nation's roller sport federation.

== National roller derby associations ==
These associations promote the activities of their member leagues and offer support and advice to their members, but do not establish rules.

- Roller Derby Association of Canada (founded 2009 as Canadian Women's Roller Derby Association, 73 members)
- United Kingdom Roller Derby Association (established 2010, at least 14 members)

== National skate federations supporting roller derby ==
Outside of the United States many roller derby leagues enjoy support from their national skate federations such as the Skate Australia, the British Roller Sports Federation and Roller Sports Canada. USA Roller Sports (USARS) is recognized by the International Roller Sports Federation (FIRS) and the United States Olympic Committee (USOC) as the National Governing Body of competitive roller sports in the United States, including speed, figure, hockey, and slalom. Affiliation with a national organization was rejected by some American leagues who prefer governance on a grass roots level, but the WFTDA and USARS have a reciprocity agreement for insurance purposes.

| Country | Federation | Number of leagues (Note: These are estimates number of leagues in the country, not the total recognised by the federation) | National recognition (Note: National recognition means the roller sport federation is recognised by the nation's top level of sport governance.) | National funding (Note: National funding would be through the national Olympic Committee or the national Institute of Sport.) | Variations supported | National roller derby governing body (Note: The national roller derby body that the national roller derby federation is partnered with and who is in charge of establishing the rules of the sport in the country.) | Refs |
|---|---|---|---|---|---|---|---|
| Australia | Skate Australia | 68 | Yes | Yes | Women's Flat Track | None | |
| Canada | Roller Sports Canada | 95 | Yes | Unclear | Women's Flat Track | Roller Derby Association of Canada (Note: According to the Association's website, they do not have a formal partnership with Roller Sports Canada, though many of their member leagues do. They have a stronger organisation relationship with USARS and WFTDA, who provide assistance with training, referees and insurance.) | |
| Norway | Norges Skøyteforbund | 8 | Unclear | Unclear | Women's Flat Track | | |
| Sweden | Svenska Skridskoförbundet | 7 | Unclear | Unclear | Women's Flat Track | None | |
| United Kingdom | British Roller Sports Federation | 70 | Yes | Yes | Women's Flat Track (Note: The British Roller Sports Federation work through the UKRDA, who state that they support men's and junior roller derby. However, all current UKRDA members are women's leagues.) | UK Roller Derby Association | |
| United States | USA Roller Sports | 272 | Yes | No | Women, Men, Junior, Co-Ed | | |

== American-based associations ==
This is a list of American-based roller derby associations. These associations establish rules and promote the activities of their member leagues. They are listed in alphabetical order.

- Junior Roller Derby Association (JRDA) (established 2009, 139 member leagues as of Dec 2017)
- Men's Roller Derby Association (established 2007, at least 18 members)
- Modern Athletic Derby Endeavor (established 2009, at least 20 members)
- Old School Derby Association (established 2007, at least 6 members)
- Renegade Rollergirls (established 2004, 7 members)
- Roller Derby Coalition of Leagues (established 2011, 8 members)
- USA Roller Sports (founded 1937)
- Women's Flat Track Derby Association (established 2004, 416 Full Member Leagues as of October 2025)
