= Roller derby =

Contact sport on roller skates

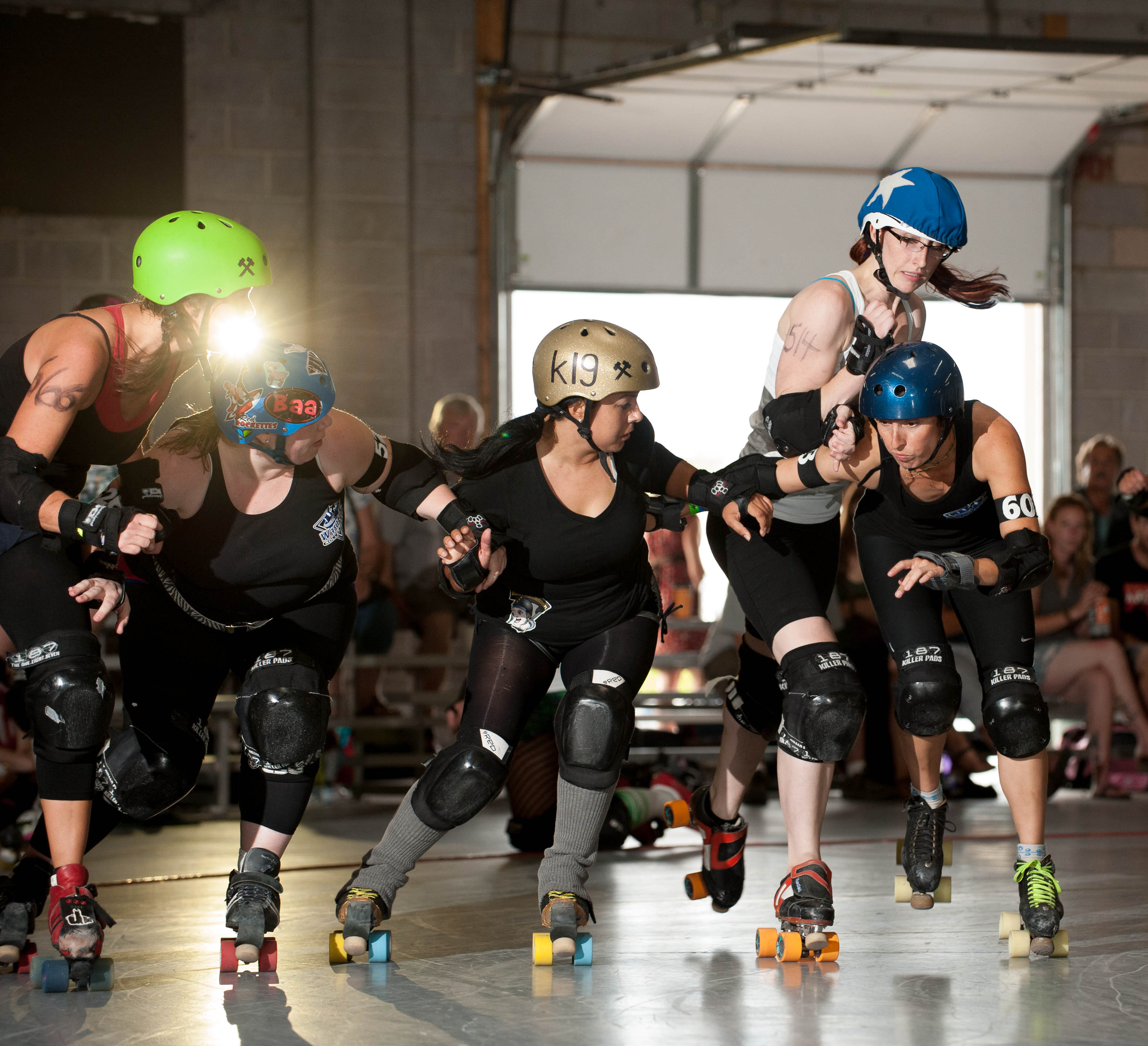
- A roller derby scrimmage in Utah (2012)
- Highest governing body: WFTDA, MRDA, JRDA, World Skate
- Nicknames: Derby
- First played: 1935, Chicago, Illinois
- Clubs: 5,000+

Characteristics
- Contact: Full
- Team members: 15 on roster, up to 5 on track during each jam.
- Type: Indoor, roller sport
- Equipment: Roller skates, helmet, knee pads, elbow pads, wrist guards, mouthguard
- Venue: Roller rink, pitch

Presence
- Olympic: No

Roller derby is a roller skating contact sport played on an oval track by two teams of five skaters. It is played by approximately 1,250 amateur leagues (Note: A Roller Derby league is synonymous with an individual club or team in other team sports, as opposed to the more typical use of the word league.) worldwide, though it is most popular in the United States.

A 60-minute roller derby game, or bout, is a series of two-minute timed jams. Each team, typically with a roster of 15, fields five skaters during each jam: one jammer, designated with a star on their helmet, and four blockers. During each jam, players skate counterclockwise on a circuit track. The jammer scores a point for each opposing blocker they lap. The blockers simultaneously defend by hindering the opposing jammer, while also playing offense by maneuvering to aid their own jammer. Because roller derby uses a penalty box, power jams, in which one team has a temporary numerical advantage after a foul, can have a major effect on scoring.

== Overview ==
While the sport has its origins in the banked-track roller-skating marathons of the 1930s, Leo Seltzer and Damon Runyon are credited with evolving the sport to its competitive form. Professional roller derby quickly became popular; in 1940, more than 5 million spectators watched in about 50 American cities. In the ensuing decades, however, it predominantly became a form of sports entertainment, where theatrical elements overshadowed athleticism. Gratuitous showmanship largely ended with the sport's grassroots revival in the first decade of the 21st century. Although roller derby retains some sports entertainment qualities such as player pseudonyms and colorful uniforms, it has abandoned scripted bouts with predetermined winners.

Modern roller derby is an international sport, mostly played by amateurs. It was under consideration as a roller sport for the 2020 Summer Olympics. Fédération Internationale de Roller Sports (FIRS), recognized by the International Olympic Committee as the official international governing body of roller sports, released its first set of Roller Derby Rules for the World Roller Games, organised by World Skate, that took place September 2017 in Nanjing, China. Most modern leagues (and their back-office volunteers) share a strong "do-it-yourself" ethic that combines athleticism with the styles of punk and camp. As of 2020, the Women's Flat Track Derby Association (WFTDA) had 451 full member leagues and 46 apprentice leagues and the Roller Derby Coalition of Leagues (RDCL) supporting women's banked track roller derby had eight full member leagues.

== Rules ==
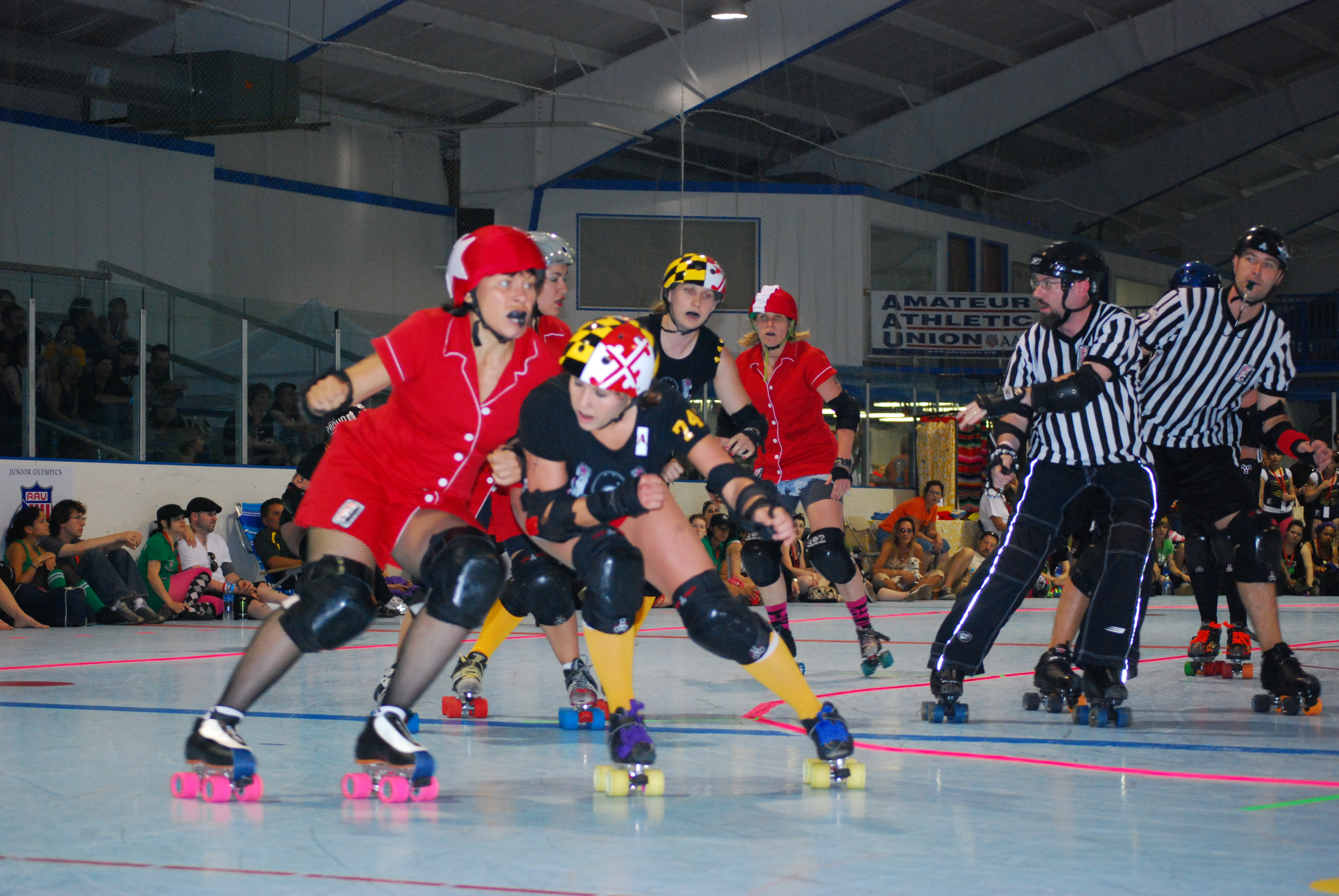
A Charm City All Stars (Baltimore, Maryland) blocker vs. a Rhode Island Riveter (Providence, Rhode Island) jammer (2008)

Contemporary roller derby has a basic set of rules, with variations reflecting the interests of a governing body's member leagues. The summary below is based on the rules of the Women's Flat Track Derby Association (WFTDA). In March 2010, Derby News Network said that more than 98% of roller derby competitions were conducted under WFTDA rules. For example, members of the United Kingdom Roller Derby Association are required to play by WFTDA rules, while members of the former Canadian Women's Roller Derby Association were encouraged to join the WFTDA.

=== Basics of play ===
Roller derby is played in two periods of 30 minutes. Two teams of up to 15 players each field up to five members for episodes called "jams". Jams last two minutes unless called off prematurely. Each team designates a scoring player (the "jammer"); the other four members are "blockers". One blocker can be designated as a "pivot"—a blocker who is allowed to become a jammer in the course of play. The next jam may involve different players of the 15 roster players, and different selections for jammer and pivot.

Position	Helmet cover	Responsibility
Jammer	Star	Scores points by lapping opposing blockers.
Blocker	None	Forms the pack, hinders the opposing jammer from passing through the pack, and helps their team's jammer pass through the pack.
Pivot	Stripe	A blocker who may be converted to a jammer during the course of a jam, if the jammer's helmet cover is correctly transferred in a "star pass" maneuver. The pivot is often an experienced player who establishes team strategy during play and sets the pace of the pack.

Standard (WFTDA/MRDA/USARS flat track roller derby) track. The MADE track differs in that the straightaways do not taper but are uniform in width along their full length.

During each jam, players skate counterclockwise on a circuit track. Points are scored only by a team's jammer. After breaking through the pack and skating one lap to begin another "trip" through the pack, the jammer scores one point for passing any opposing blocker. (Note: Until 2019, the jammer also scored a point by passing the opposing jammer. There were 5 potential points per trip.) The rules describe an "earned" pass; notably, the jammer must be in-bounds and upright. The jammer's first earned pass scores a point for passing that blocker and a point for each opponent blocker not on the track (for instance, serving a penalty, or when the opposition did not field five players for the jam). If the jammer passes the entire pack, it is a four-point scoring trip, commonly called a "grand slam".

Each team's blockers use body contact, changing positions, and other tactics to help their jammer score while hindering the opposing team's jammer.

=== Jams ===
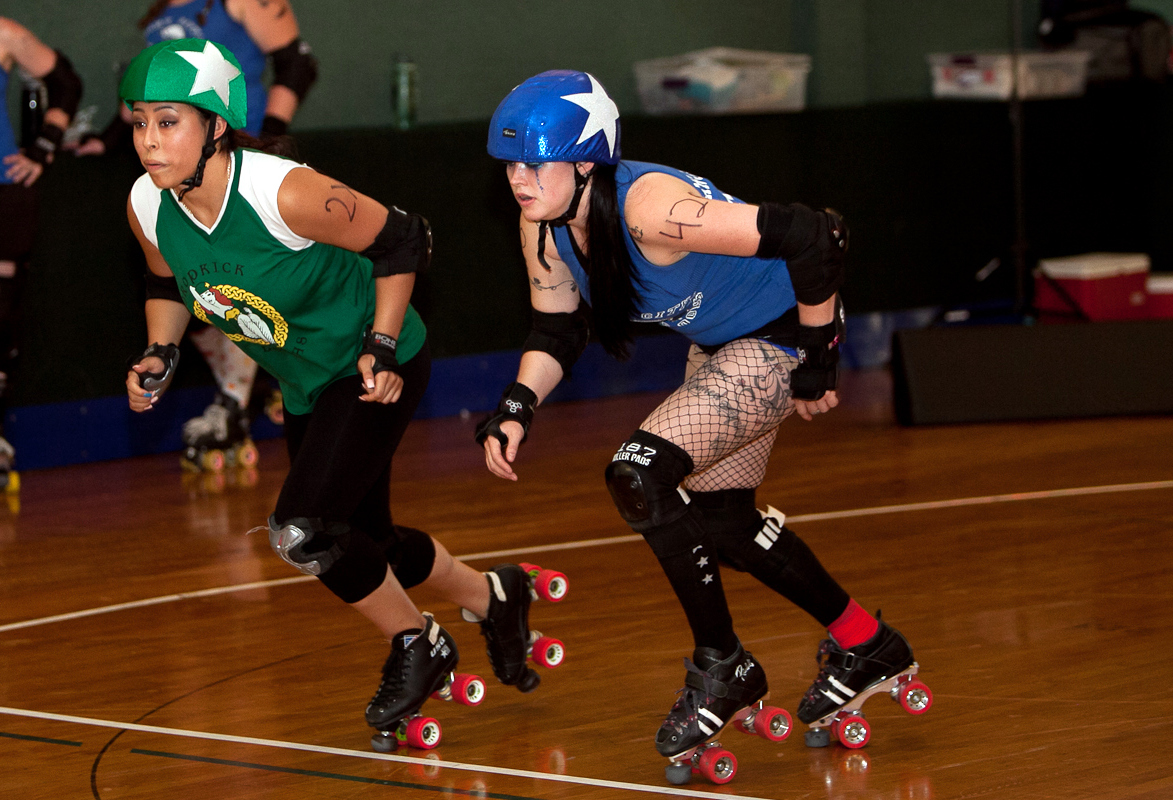
Two jammers (from the Oly Rollers and Rainy City) race from the jammer line (2011).

Play begins by blockers lining up on the track anywhere between the "jammer line" and the "pivot line" 30 feet (9.1 meters) in front. The jammers start behind the jammer line. Jams begin on a single short whistle blast, upon which both jammers and blockers may begin engaging immediately.

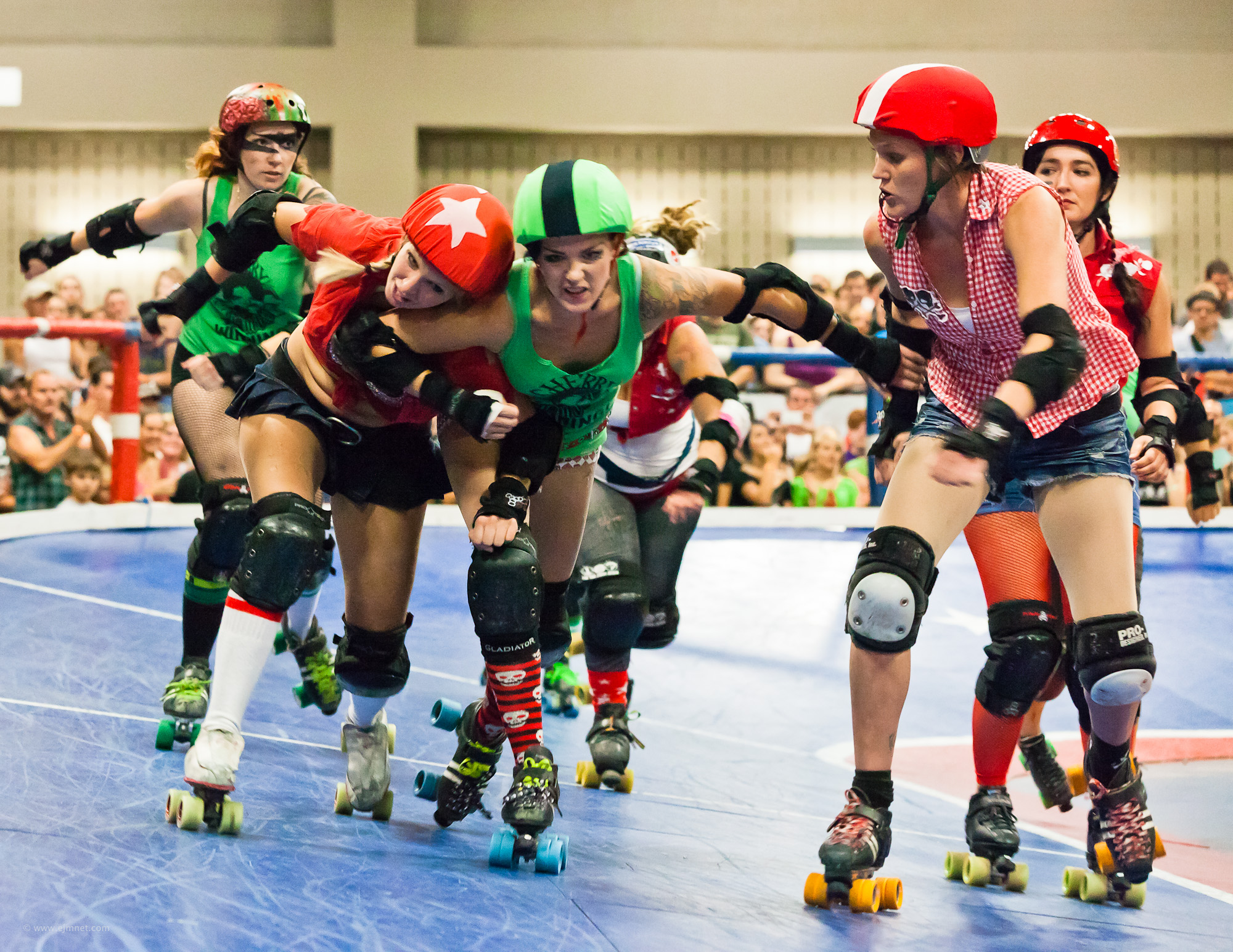
Lonestar Rollergirls in Austin, Texas, play on a banked track (2011). The jammer (wearing the starred helmet cover) is trying to pass a pivot (wearing a striped cover) with various blockers assisting.

The pack is the largest single group of blockers containing members of both teams skating in proximity, arranged such that each player is within 10 feet (3.0 meters) of the next. Blockers must maintain the pack, but can skate freely within 20 feet (6.1 meters) behind and ahead of it, an area known as the "engagement zone".

The first jammer to break through the pack earns the status of "lead jammer". A designated referee blows the whistle twice and continually points at the jammer to confer lead jammer status, which lets that jammer stop the jam at any time by repeatedly placing hands on hips. Lead jammer status cannot be transferred to other skaters, but certain actions (such as being sent to the penalty box) cancel lead jammer status, meaning that the jam has no lead jammer and must continue for the full two-minute period. If the jam is not called off by the lead jammer, it ends after two minutes. If time remains in the period, teams then have 30 seconds to get on the track and line up for the next jam. If the 30-minute period ends while a jam is underway, the jam plays out to its natural conclusion.

=== Blocking ===
An Idahoan blocker impedes a Utahn pivot at Spudtown Knockdown IV in 2013 in Garden City, Idaho.

A skater may block an opponent to impede their movement or to force them out of bounds. The blocker must be upright, skating counterclockwise, in bounds, and within the engagement zone. Groups of blockers on the same team typically create formations, known as walls, to prevent the opposing blocker from passing. Blocking with hands, elbows, head, and feet is prohibited, as is contact above the shoulders, below mid-thigh, or to the back.

=== Penalties ===
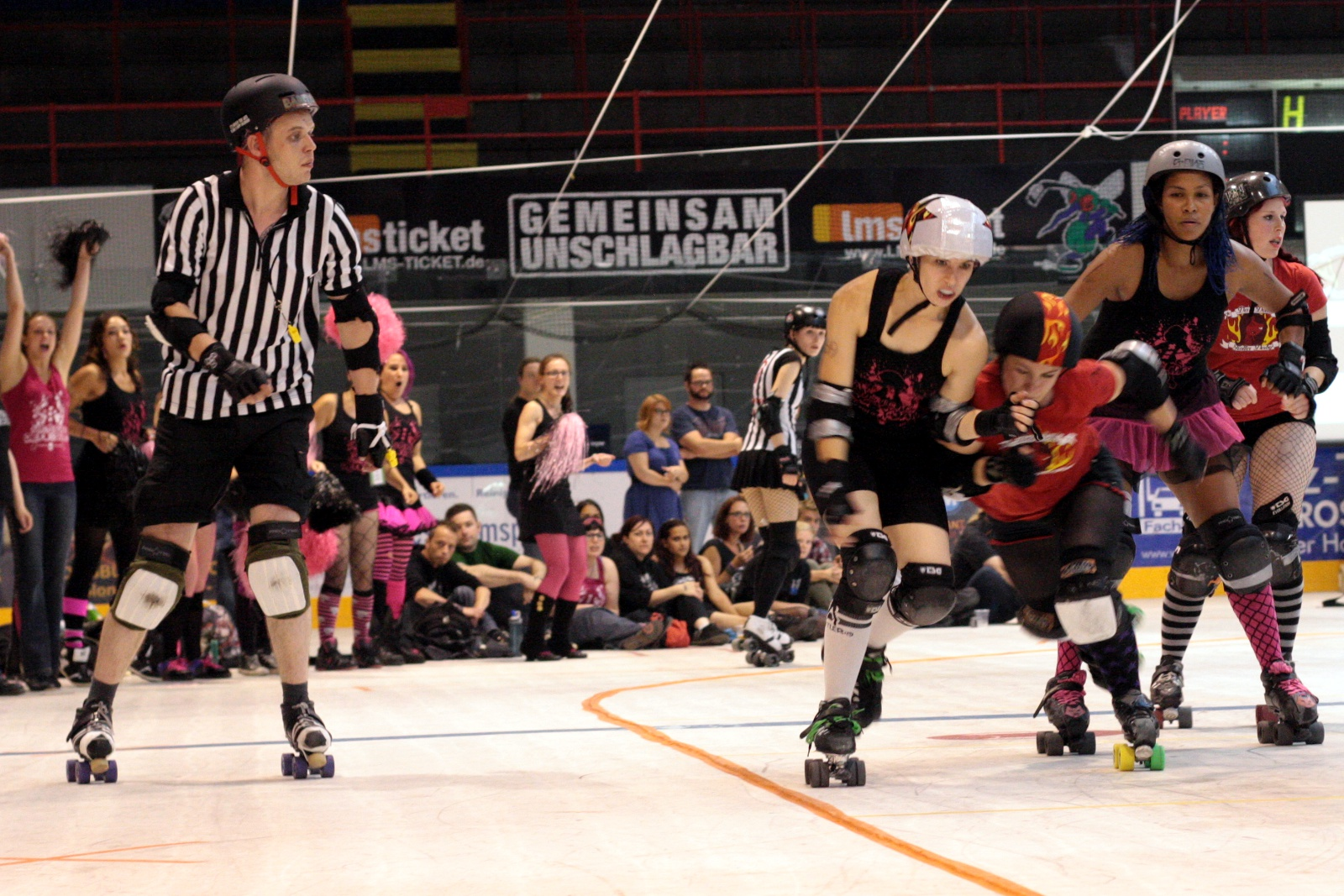
A German pivot attempts to knock a Dutch jammer out of bounds (the yellow line) at a 2011 bout held in Essen, Germany.

Referees penalize rules violations. A player receiving a penalty is removed from play and must sit in the penalty box for 30 seconds of jam time. If the jam ends during this interval, the player remains in the penalty box during the subsequent jam until the interval ends. While the penalty is being served, the penalized player's team plays short-handed, as in ice hockey. A player "fouls out" of the game on the seventh penalty, and is required to return to the locker room.

A "power jam", derived from ice hockey's "power play", refers to a scenario when one team's jammer is sent to the penalty box. In this case, that jammer's team cannot score. The opposing team's blockers typically switch to playing offense for the duration of the other jammer's penalty. If the lead jammer is penalized, no one can prematurely end the jam.

It would be pointless to play if neither team could score; thus, both jammers cannot serve a penalty at the same time. If one jammer is sent to the penalty box while the opposing jammer is already serving a penalty, the opposing jammer is released from the penalty box early. The second jammer's penalty is then only as long as the amount of time the first jammer spent in the box.

=== Equipment ===
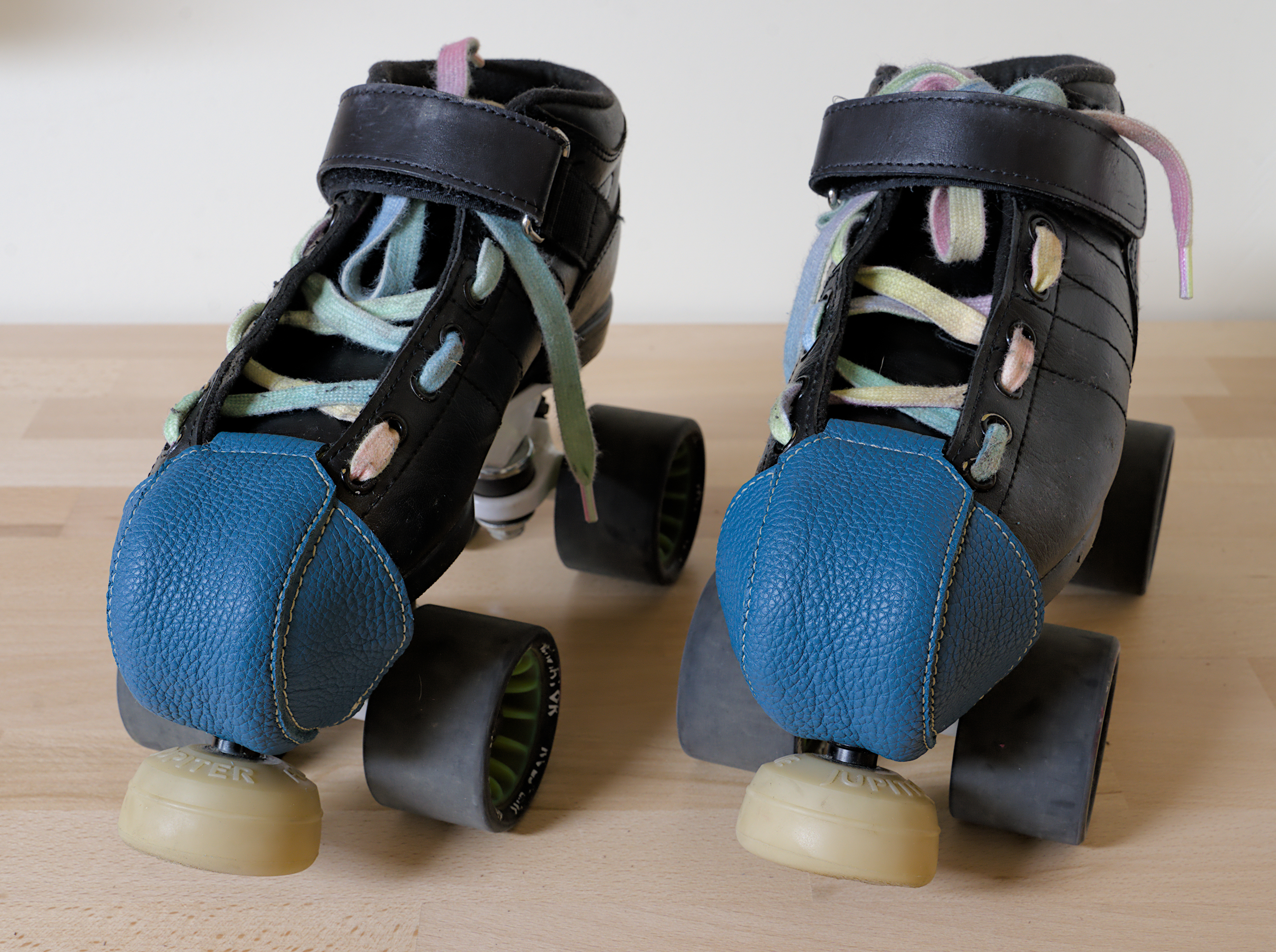
Quad skates with leather protections

Players skate on four-wheeled ("quad") roller skates, and are required to wear protective equipment, including a helmet, wrist guards, elbow pads, knee pads, and mouth guards. All current sets of roller derby rules explicitly forbid inline skates for players. (USARS requires quad skates for all skaters. WFTDA and MRDA permit inline skates for referees, but virtually all referees wear quad skates.) Individual teams may mandate additional gear, such as padded knee length pants, similar to what aggressive skateboarders wear, and sex-specific gear such as a hard-case sports bra and protective cups.

== Strategy and tactics ==
Offense and defense are played simultaneously, a volatile aspect that complicates strategy and tactics. For example, one team's blockers may take offensive action to create a gap in the opposing wall for their jammer to pass through, but this same maneuver could potentially weaken their own defenses and allow the opposing team's jammer to score.

Strategies (high-level plans toward achieving the game's goal, which is to outscore the opposition) include the following:

- Ending the jam: The lead jammer can "call off" or end the jam at any time, controlling the opposition's ability to score points. The strategy for a jam is not to score a lot of points but to outscore the opposition. Often, the lead jammer scores as many points as possible on the first scoring trip, and then ends the jam before the opposing jammer has the opportunity to score any points. If the jammer gets the lead but is then passed by the opposing jammer, they may decide to call off the jam without scoring any points themself in order to prevent the other team's jammer from scoring any points.
- Passing the star: The jammer for a team may "pass the star" (may perform a "star pass") to the pivot—that is, hand the helmet cover with the star to the pivot, which turns the pivot into the jammer. Passing the star does not nullify any earned pass of an opponent that the former jammer made, but passing the star forward never constitutes an earned pass. A jammer might pass the star because of fatigue, injury, or because the pivot is in a better position to score. Passing the star is also sometimes referred to as "passing the panty", as helmet covers are sometimes known as "panties".
- Killing a penalty: Captained by the pivot, blockers adapt their play to a penalty situation. For example, a short-handed team may try to make the pack skate faster to slow down scoring action until the team returns to full strength. (Note: Before 2013, there were "major" and "minor" penalties, the former included any player's fourth penalty, and it was strategic for a key player to deliberately commit such a penalty when it would have least effect.)

Tactics (deliberate conceptual tasks in support of the strategy) may include the following:

- Walling up: Two or more blockers skate together to make it difficult for the opposing team (especially its jammer) to maneuver. They may skate side by side and use a "wide stance" to maximize the blockade, but must not link with or grasp each other, or otherwise form an impenetrable connection. The ability to suddenly form a wall denies the opposition time to respond. A wall can inhibit, slow down, and ultimately trap the opposing jammer. An effective wall may last for an entire jam. Variations on the tactic include the following:
  - Backwards bracing, in which one skater, forward of the wall, skates backward to sight the jammer and direct teammates forming the wall.
  - A skater may break off from the wall to actively challenge the opposing jammer, with a teammate replacing the skater in the wall.
  - If the opposing jammer tries to pass the wall on one side, players may abandon the other side to fortify the active side of the wall.

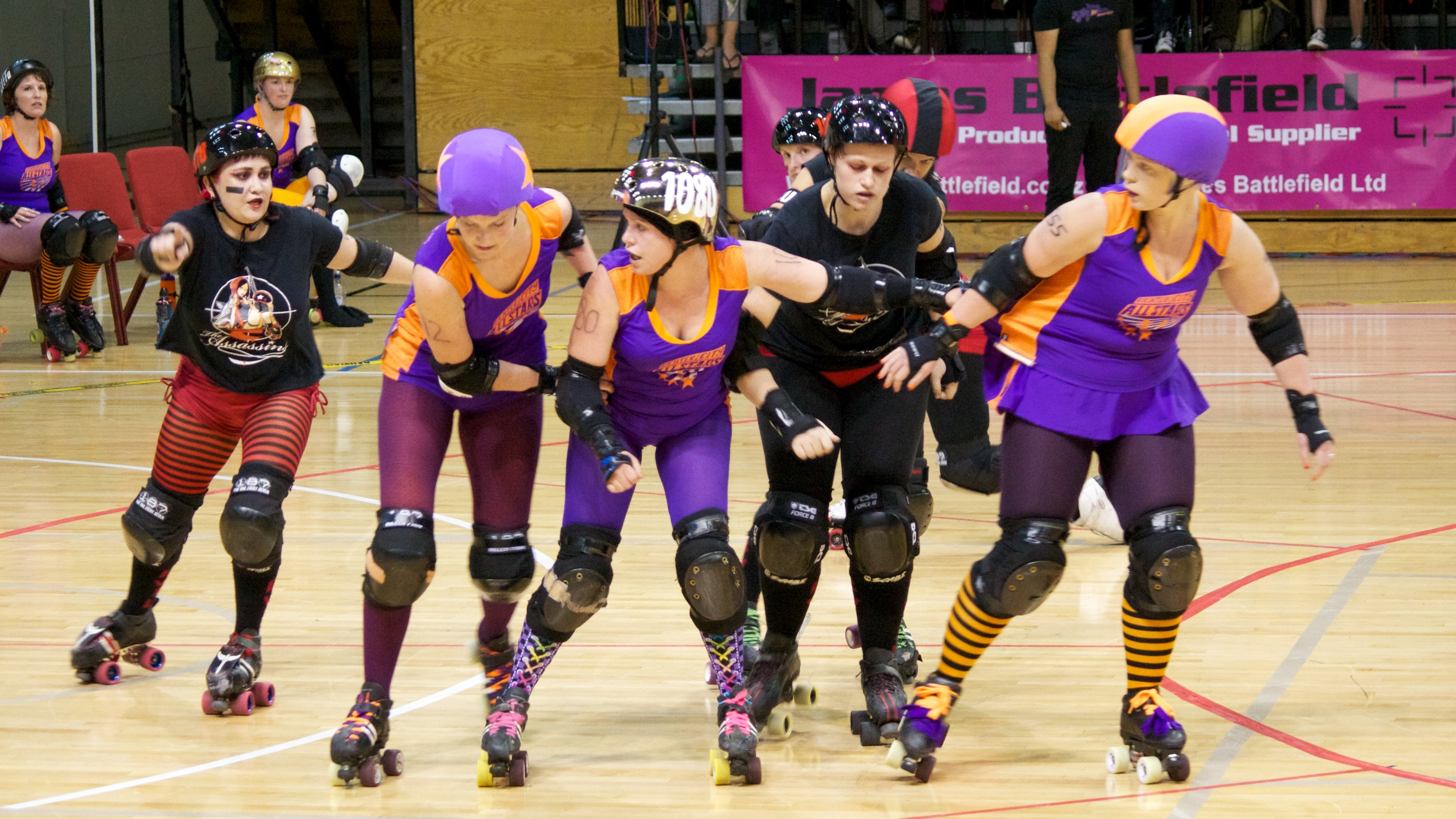
Two Wellington skaters (in purple) form a wall, limiting their opponents' movement, while their jammer (leftmost skater in purple) takes a hip whip to accelerate past the pack.

- Jammer tactics, in response to a wall or other obstacles by the opposing team's defense, include the following:
  - Pushing through gaps in the wall or inducing the wall to separate by use of physical force.
  - Evading the obstacle to one side or the other.
  - Juking, where the jammer seems to be skating to one side but quickly shifts to the other side.
  - Rolling around the end of the obstacle (spinning 360°) to end up ahead of it.
  - Using teammates to impede the defense from adjusting, such as by setting screens.
  - Using a whip, where one or more teammates grasp the jammer's hand(s) and swing the jammer forward, transferring speed and momentum to the jammer.
  - Apex Jump: Using the inside curve of the track to leap out of bounds but land in bounds, passing opposing players.
- Goating: The pack is defined as the largest group of in-bounds blockers, skating in proximity, containing members from both teams. In the "goat-herding" tactic, one team surrounds a blocker of the opposing team and then slows so that that group becomes the pack. The rest of the opposing team, skating ahead, are thus put out of play and cannot legally block the goat-herders' jammer.
- Running back or recycling: When a skater bumps the opponent jammer off the track, the jammer can only re-enter the track behind the skater. The skater skates clockwise on the track toward the rear of the engagement zone to maximize the time the jammer must spend before returning to action.
- Bridging: By separating up to 10 feet (3.0 meters), blockers can stretch both the pack and the engagement zone, allowing teammates to keep hindering the opposition jammer. For example, in the strategy of running back (see above), coordinated action by the four skaters other than the jammer could force the opponent jammer to detour a full 40 feet (12 meters) before returning to action.

== Officials ==
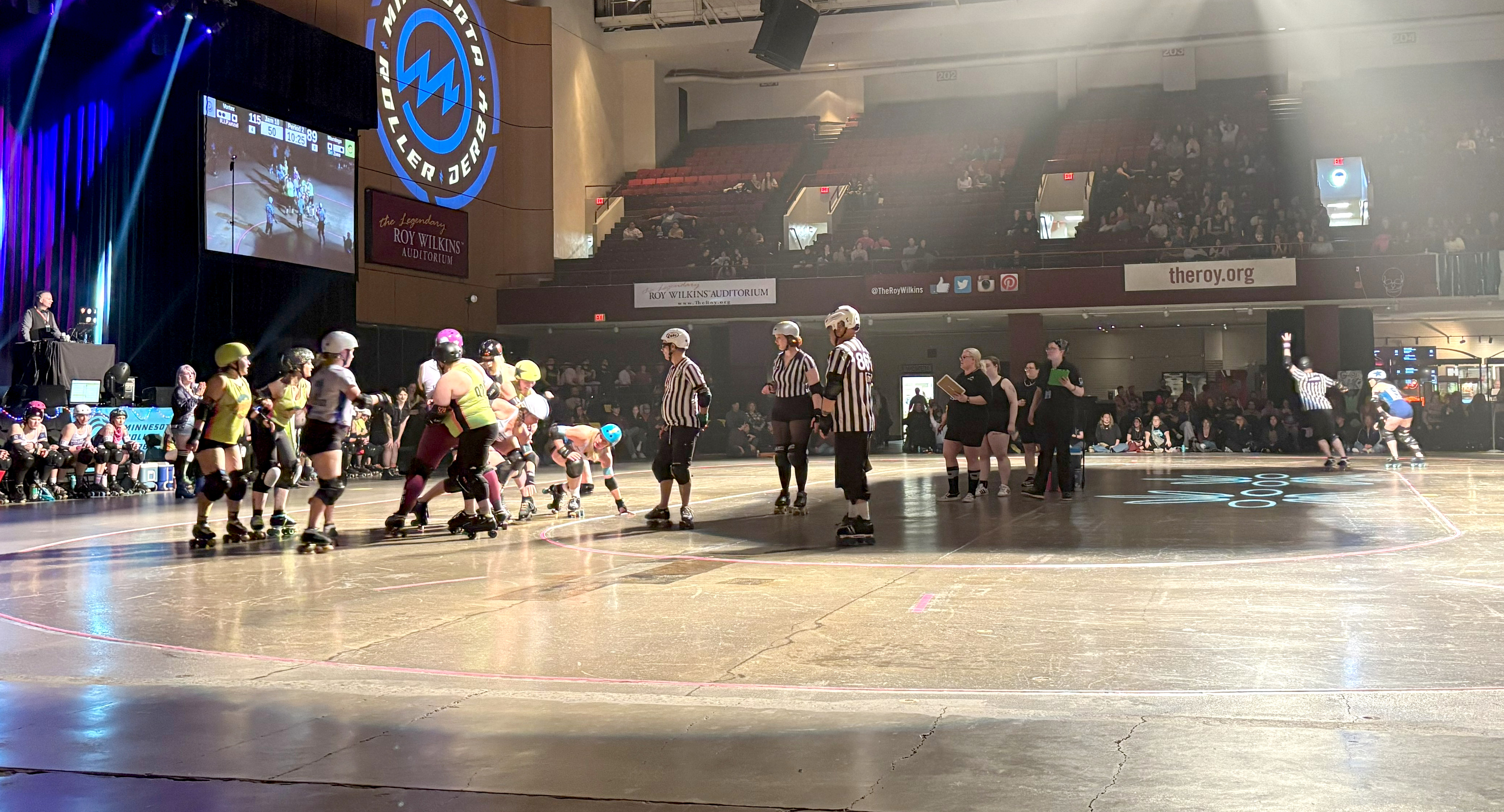
Overview of roller derby track with officials

WFTDA bouts are officiated by three to seven skating referees and many non-skating officials (NSOs). Volunteer leagues adapt when fewer than the optimal number of officials are present.

=== Referees ===
Up to four referees skate on the inside of the track. In flat-track derby, up to three additional referees skate on the outside of the track. They call penalties, award points, and ensure safe game play. Referees must wear skates and typically wear white and black stripes.

Type	Number	Responsibility
Head Referee	1	The head referee is responsible for the general supervision of the bout and has final authority on all rulings. The head referee skates as an inside pack referee, but is also responsible for issuing expulsions and for announcing the results of official reviews.
Pack Referees	Up to 5	Pack referees are responsible for watching the skaters in the pack, assessing pack definition, and calling penalties. They are located both inside and outside the track.
Jammer Referees	2	Skating on the inside of the track, a jammer referee watches the jammer of a designated team, awards points scored by their jammer, signals whether their jammer has achieved lead jammer status, and signals the end of the jam if their jammer is lead and calls off the jam. Jammer referees wear a wristband (and optionally a helmet cover) in that team's color to identify which team's jammer they are watching.

=== Non-skating officials (NSOs) ===
NSOs take up a range of positions inside and outside the track, start and time the jams, record and display scores and penalties communicated by referees, record the number of each skater on track for a given jam, and time and record skaters in the penalty box.

Type	Number	Responsibility
Scorekeepers	2	Record points scored by jammers, as indicated by the Jammer Referees.
Penalty Trackers	1 (min)	Record each skater's penalties and notify the head referee of skaters in the current jam who are in danger of fouling out.
Penalty Box Manager	1	The manager is the head of the affairs within the penalty box. The manager can call penalties for penalty box violations or illegal procedures (such as removing the helmet in the penalty box). Also, the manager points where the player is assigned to sit, times the jammers, and executes any necessary jammer swap.
Penalty Box Timers	2 (min)	Ensure skaters sent to the penalty box serve their entire penalties, and notify referees if any do not.
Jam Timer	1	Start jams, signal when a jam runs to the full two minutes, time the 30 seconds between jams, and call official timeouts.
Lineup Tracker	2	Record the role (Jammer, Pivot, or Blocker) of every player on the track in each jam.
Scoreboard Operator	1	Update the scoreboard after every scoring pass.

== History ==
=== Professional endurance races ===
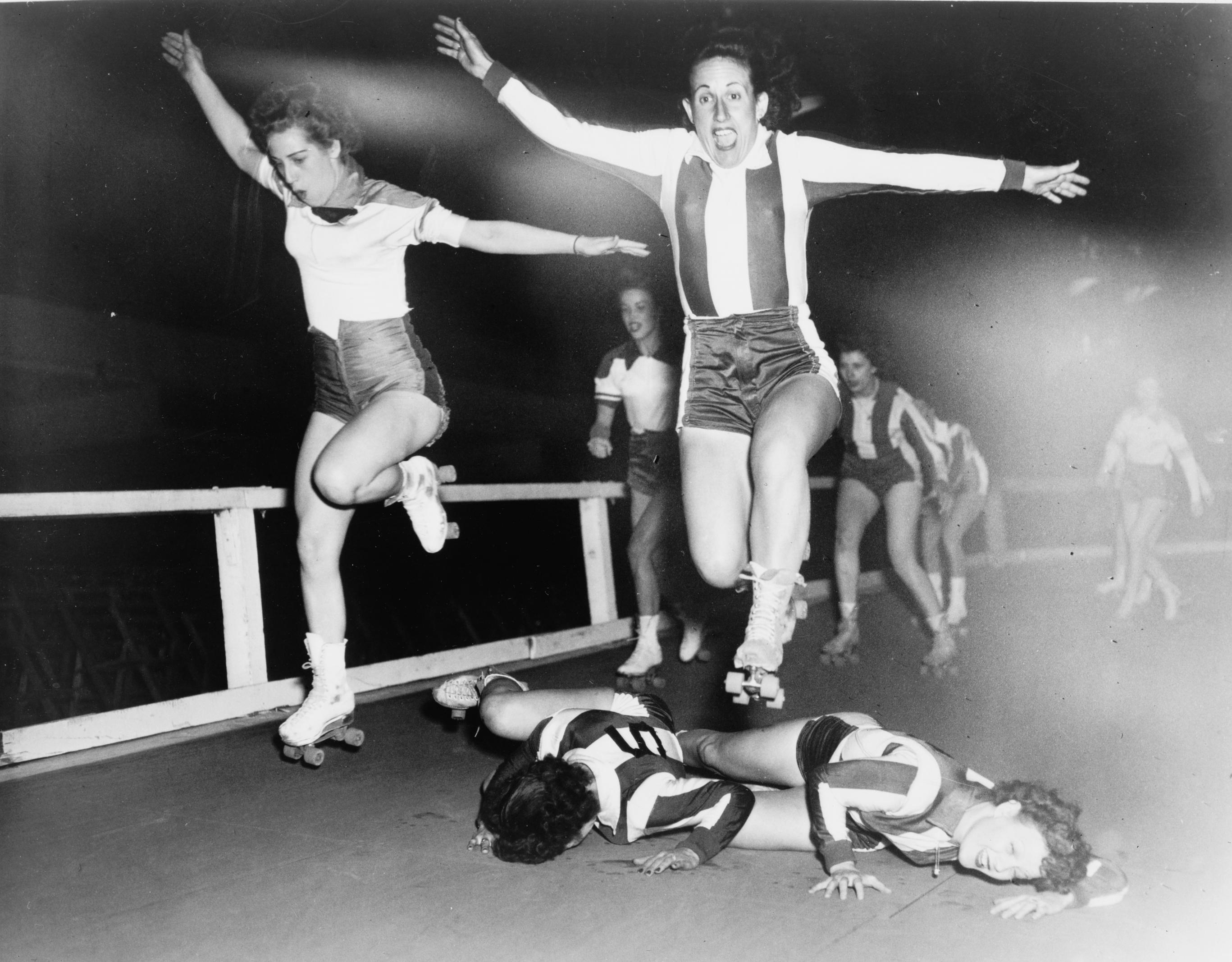
Two women's league roller derby skaters leap over two who have fallen in a March 1950 bout in New York City.

The growing popularity of roller skating in the United States led to the formation of organized multi-day endurance races for cash prizes as early as the mid-1880s. Speed and endurance races continued to be held on both flat and banked tracks in the century's first three decades and spectators enjoyed the spills and falls of the skaters. The term derby was used to refer to such races by 1922. (Note: "Roland Cloni of Akron, world's champion roller skater, who yesterday tried out the track in the Broadway armory, where the national roller skating derby will be held this week, asserted new world's records can be established for flat tracks. The derby will open tomorrow and run until Saturday.")

=== Evolution to contact sport ===
The endurance races began to transform into the contemporary form of the sport in the mid-1930s, when promoter Leo Seltzer (Note: Sources disagree on whether it was Leo alone or with his brother, the skate maker Oscar Seltzer.) (Note: "Roller derby has entertained the masses in one form or another since the 1930s, when brothers Leo and Oscar Seltzer conceptualized the idea of a skating contest on a Chicago restaurant tablecloth.") created the Transcontinental Roller Derby, a month-long simulation of a road race between two-person teams of professional skaters. The spectacle became a popular touring exhibition. In the late 1930s, sportswriter Damon Runyon persuaded Seltzer to change the Roller Derby rules to increase skater contact. By 1939, after experimenting with different team and scoring arrangements, Seltzer's created a touring company of four pairs of teams (always billed as the local "home" team versus either New York or Chicago), with two five-person teams on the track at once, scoring points when its members lapped opponents.

=== Television ===
On November 29, 1948, before television viewership was widespread, Roller Derby debuted on New York television. The broadcasts increased spectator turnout for live matches. For the 1949–1950 season, Seltzer formed the National Roller Derby League (NRDL), comprising six teams. NRDL season playoffs sold out Madison Square Garden for a week. During the late 1950s and 1960s, the sport was broadcast on several networks, but attendance declined. Jerry Seltzer (Leo's son), the Roller Derby "commissioner", hoped to use television to expand the live spectator base. He adapted the sport for television by developing scripted story lines and rules designed to improve television appeal, but derby's popularity had declined.

1989 saw the debut of RollerGames, an even more theatrical variant of roller derby for national audiences. It used a figure-8 track and rules adapted for this track. Bill Griffiths, Sr. served as commissioner while his son, Bill Griffiths, Jr., managed the L.A. T-Birds, who (according to the storyline) were seeking revenge on the Violators (led by Skull) for cheating in the Commissioner's Cup. The other teams included the Maniacs (led by Guru Drew), Bad Attitude (led by Ms. Georgia Hase), the Rockers (led by DJ Terringo and consisting of skaters who were also professional rock and roll musicians), and Hot Flash (led by Juan Valdez Lopez). It ran one season, because some of its syndicators went bankrupt.

In 1999, TNN debuted RollerJam, which used the classic rules and banked oval track, but allowed inline skates (although some skaters wore traditional quad skates). Jerry Seltzer was commissioner for this version.

The emphasis on showmanship, theatrical storylines, and pre-determined outcomes (much like professional wrestling) was a factor in the decline of professional roller derby.

== Contemporary roller derby ==
=== Amateur revival ===
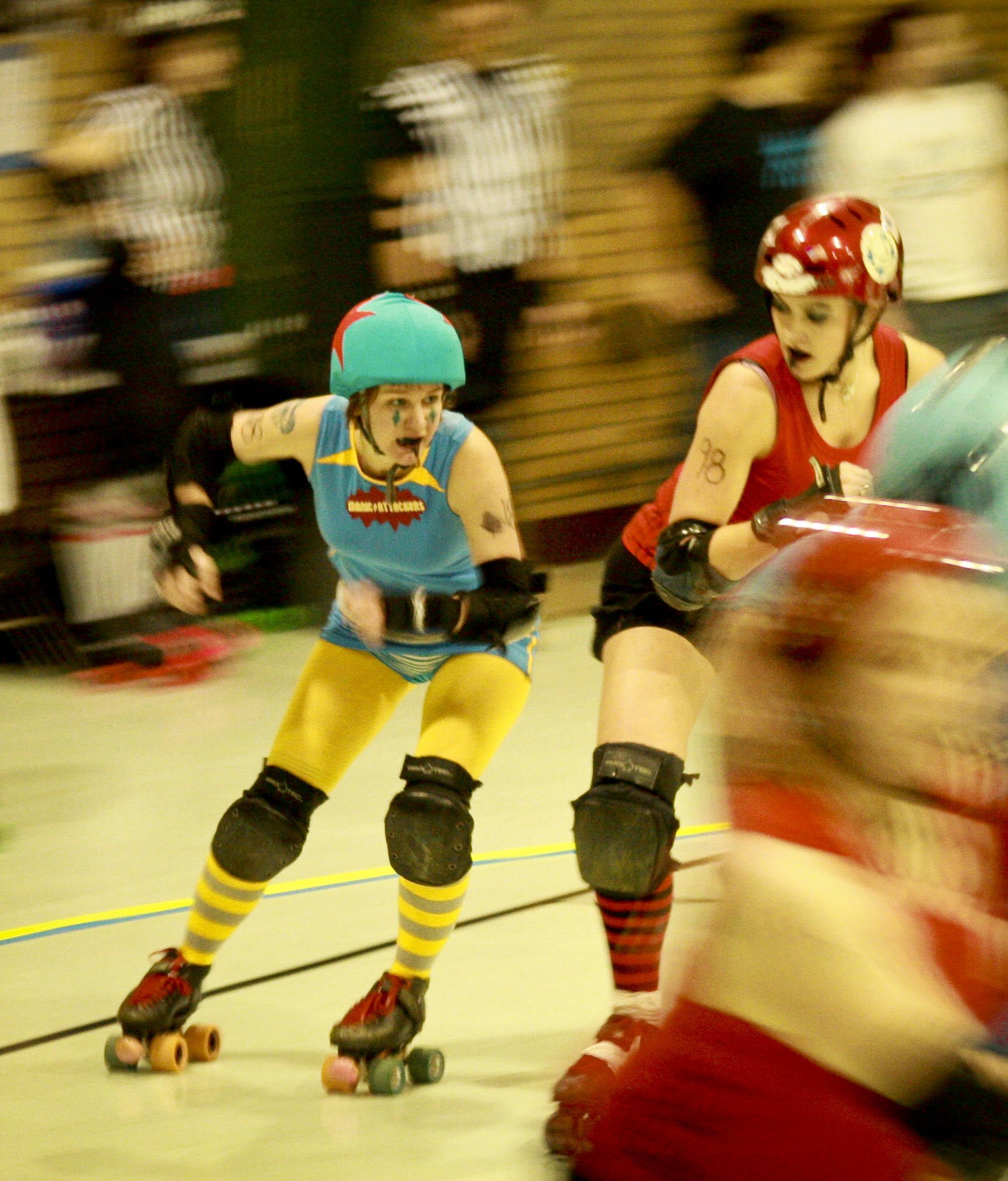
A Windy City Rollers (Chicago, Illinois) jammer (2008)

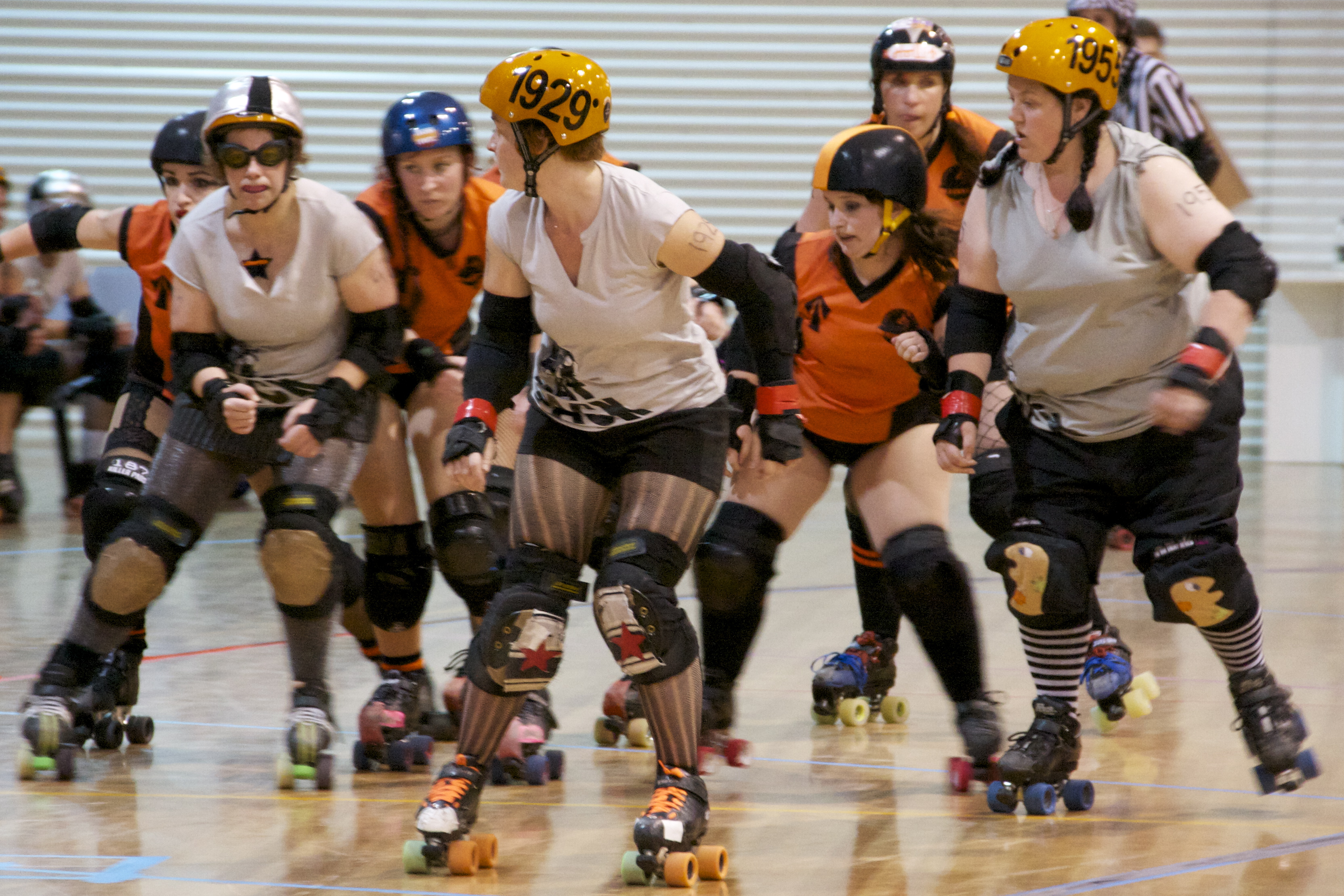
Teams competing in Hobart, Australia, in November 2010

Roller derby began its modern revival in Austin, Texas, in the early 2000s as an all-female, woman-organized amateur sport. By August 2006, there were over 135 similar leagues. Leagues outside the U.S. also began forming in 2006, and international competition soon followed. There are over 2,000 amateur leagues worldwide in countries including Canada, Australia, New Zealand, the United Kingdom, France, Brazil, Germany, Belgium, Finland, Norway, Sweden, Denmark, Israel, Singapore, UAE, Egypt, Thailand, and China. In many international leagues, gear and equipment must be imported. Roller derby's contemporary resurgence has been regarded as an aspect of globalization which demonstrates "the speed with which pop culture is now transported by highly mobile expatriates and social media, while also highlighting the changing role of women in many societies".

Many roller derby leagues are amateur, self-organized and all-female and were formed in a do-it-yourself spirit by relatively new enthusiasts. In many leagues (especially in the U.S.), a punk aesthetic and/or third-wave feminist ethic is prominent. Members of fledgling leagues often practice and strategize together, regardless of team affiliation, between bouts. Most compete on flat tracks, though several leagues skate on banked tracks, with more in the planning stages.

Each league typically features local teams in public bouts that are popular with a diverse fan base. Some venues host audiences ranging up to 7,000. Successful local leagues have formed traveling teams comprising the league's best players to compete with comparable teams from other cities and regions. In February 2012, the International Olympic Committee considered roller derby, amongst eight other sports, for inclusion in the 2020 Olympic Games.

In 2009, the feature film Whip It featured roller derby and introduced a wider audience to the sport. The WFTDA encouraged leagues to coordinate with promotions during the film's release to increase awareness of the leagues. Furthermore, corporate advertising has used roller derby themes in television commercials for insurance, a breakfast cereal, and an over-the-counter analgesic.

=== Derby names ===
Examples of derby names
Name	Allusion
Guinefear of Jamalot	Guinevere of Camelot
Mazel Tov Cocktail	Mazel tov, Molotov cocktail
O Hell No Kitty	Hello Kitty
Sandra Day O'Clobber	Sandra Day O'Connor
Punky Bruiser	Punky Brewster
Roly Mary Mother of Quad	Holy Mary Mother of God
Ania Marx	On Your Marks
Princess Lay-Ya Flat	Princess Leia
Anna Mosity	Animosity
Smack Ops	Black Ops
Cactus Rack	Cactus Jack, a persona of retired professional wrestler Mick Foley
Trauma Queen	Drama Queen
Bonnie Thunders	Johnny Thunders

Most players in roller leagues skate under pseudonyms, also called "derby names" or "skater names". These typically use word play with satirical, mock-violent or sexual puns, alliteration, and allusions to pop culture. Referees often use derby names as well, often shown on the backs of their striped uniforms. Some players claim their names represent alter egos that they adopt while skating.

Whether a team should skate under real names or derby names is sometimes debated. Some derby names are obscene, a subject of some internal controversy.

Copying of derby names has attracted legal and sociological analysis as an example of indigenous development of property rights. New players are encouraged to check derby names against an international roster to ensure they are not already in use.

The names of roller derby events are also as sardonic and convoluted—for example, Night of the Rolling Dead (Night of the Living Dead), Knocktoberfest (Oktoberfest), Spanksgiving (Thanksgiving), Seasons Beatings (Seasons Greetings), Grandma Got Run Over By a Rollergirl ("Grandma Got Run Over by a Reindeer"), Cinco de May-hem (Cinco de Mayo), and War of the Wheels (War of the Worlds).

=== Safety ===
EMTs and others tend to an injured skater.

Roller derby is a contact sport, and injuries can occur. Superficial injuries include bruising. However, torn ligaments, broken bones, and concussions also occur.

Some leagues prominently display their injuries, to embellish the image of violence or machismo. However, some skaters say the sport is reasonably safe if skaters take precautions. The rules require appropriate medical professionals on-site at every bout, even if not required by laws or arena regulations. The WFTDA offers insurance for leagues in the United States with legal liability and accident coverage, but it recommends that skaters also carry their own primary medical insurance.

=== Expansion ===
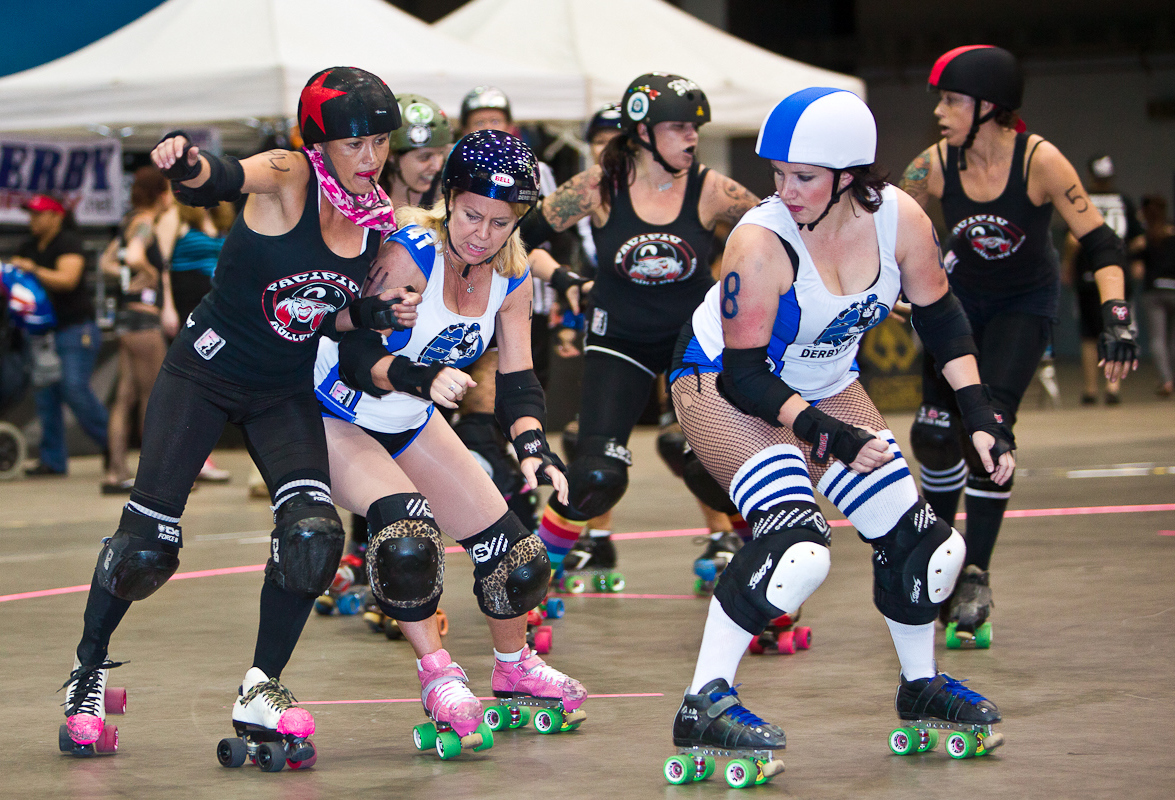
Santa Cruz Derby Girls v Pacific Roller Derby at the 2011 Dust Devil tournament. Players wear a uniform shirt with leggings. Some wear short shorts and knee/thigh high socks.

Although the early 2000s revival of roller derby was initially all-female, some leagues later introduced all-male teams and all-gender games; as of May 2013 there were over 140 junior roller derby programs in the United States, and many more around the world.

College roller derby is also expanding in the United States. The University of Arizona's Derby Cats describe themselves as the first-ever official college flat-track roller derby team. The first intercollegiate derby bout took place on March 3, 2018, when the Claremont Colleges roller derby team defeated Arizona State University.

The website FlatTrackStats compiles ratings of WFTDA teams, adjusting them after every bout based on how the actual score compares to the predicted score. The WFTDA's own Stats Repository has comparable information and often is updated at halftime of a bout.

Roller derby bouts are now streamed online, and there are archived videos of past bouts and tournaments. The WFTDA offers live streaming video of its tournaments at wftda.tv. Derby News Network offered live streaming video and archived video including events outside the WFTDA.

FiveOnFive magazine covers roller derby and diverse aspects such as business, training, junior roller derby, and nutrition.

== Governance and organization ==
The largest governing body for the sport is the Women's Flat Track Derby Association (WFTDA), with 397 full member leagues and 48 apprentice leagues. WFTDA membership is a major goal of aspiring leagues. Other associations support either mixed-gender or men-only derby; the largest organization supporting male roller derby is the Men's Roller Derby Association (MRDA). Within the United States, the Junior Roller Derby Association governs play by those under 18. It modifies the WFTDA rules for minors at three skill levels, with the lowest level allowing no intentional contact between skaters, and the highest allowing full contact; additional rules are also changed according to the needs of youth skaters. Some U.S. leagues decline affiliation with a national organization because they prefer local governance.

Although WFTDA has been the largest worldwide roller-derby organization, the IOC has recognized World Skate (formerly Fédération Internationale de Roller Sports) as the only governing body able to sanction international roller derby competitions within the Olympic Movement. Disputes between World Skate and WFTDA has meant that only 4 teams were present in the first Roller Derby World Championships organized by World Skate in 2017, as part of the 2017 World Roller Games

USA Roller Sports (USARS) is recognized by the International Roller Sports Federation (FIRS) and the United States Olympic Committee (USOC) as the National Governing Body of competitive roller sports in the United States, including speed, figure, hockey, roller derby and slalom. WFTDA and USARS maintain a reciprocity agreement for insurance purposes.

Outside the United States, many roller derby leagues enjoy support from their national skate federations, such as Skate Australia, the British Roller Sports Federation, and Roller Sports Canada. In Europe, roller derby was recognized as a sport in Paris in 2010 by the Federation Internationale de Roller Sports (FIRS), which reports directly to the International Olympic Committee. As of 2017, FIRS has been accepted as the international rule set by the International Olympic Committee. Teams competed under the FIRS rules at the 2017 Nanjing Games. The former Canadian Women's Roller Derby Association worked with the American federation.

=== Tournaments ===
- Roller Derby World Cup
- Men's Roller Derby World Cup
- WFTDA Championships

Also Part of World Skate Games and other Events and Regional Championship by World Skate.

Since 2006, the WFTDA has sponsored an annual championship. In 2008, it adopted the "Big 5" format: four regional playoffs and a final championship tournament. As of 2019, the WFTDA postseason includes two playoffs that feed into the Championship tournament, plus three standalone, regionally-based Continental Cups. The WFTDA also recognizes eligible tournaments hosted by member leagues.

Internationally, the first Roller Derby World Cup took place in Toronto, Canada, in December 2011. The second World Cup took place in Dallas, Texas, in December 2014.

Since 2012, USARS has held an annual Roller Derby National Championship. In 2017, FIRS and the USOC recognized USARS to participate in the 2017 Nanjing games.

The largest roller derby tournament in the southern hemisphere, the Great Southern Slam, has been held biennially in Adelaide, South Australia, since 2010.

== Social significance ==
Zaina Arafat said in the Virginia Quarterly Review that roller derby defies heteronormativity and patriarchal standards. In Egypt, Arafat says, there are expectations that a woman will not show visible scars, will have an unblemished body for her husband, and will refrain from activities that may damage her body. She says roller derby in Egypt is subversive, as it acts as an indirect political statement.

Author Carly Giesler said that skaters enact sexualities that create or reclaim an identity, and their role parodies "hegemonic scripts of sexuality" through the use of costumes, derby names and personas. Roller derby acts as a unique stage for female athletes, letting them rebut constraints society places on women and female athletes. Giesler said that female sports objectifies them for the male gaze, but roller derby turns this on its head by disregarding gender roles and norms.

== See also ==
- Bibliography of roller derby
- History of roller derby
- List of roller derby leagues
- List of roller derby associations
