= Roller Sports Canada =

Sports governing body in Canada

- Type: Sports federation
- Official language: English / French
- Website: http://rollersports.ca/

This organisation is the national governing body for roller sports in the country. Roller Sports Canada recognises roller derby as a roller sport.

== See also ==
- International Roller Sports Federation
- International Roller Sports Federation - Inline
- Roller derby in Canada
