= List of roller skaters =

The following is a list of notable roller skaters and inline skaters. The list is sorted by roller skating disciplines (inline speed skating, roller inline hockey, downhill, artistic roller skating), gender and competing nationality. Note that some definitions of roller skating include inline, while others intend to specify quad skates.

== Inline speed skating and aggressive inline skaters ==
=== Male ===
==== American ====
- Chad Hedrick
- Derek Parra
- Joey Mantia

==== French ====
- Alexis Contin
- Pascal Briand
- Elton de Souza

==== New Zealander ====
- Shane Dobbin
- Peter Michael
- Reyon Kay

==== India ====
- Dhanush Babu
- Sarvesh Amte
- Jayant Rajora

=== Female ===
==== American ====
- Brittany Bowe

==== Spanish ====
- Ghizlane Samir

== Roller derby ==
- Ashlie Atkinson
- Bill Bogash
- Toughie Brasuhn
- Ann Calvello
- Alex Cohen
- Danielle Colby
- Shauna Cross
- Lezlie Deane
- Bonnie D.Stroir
- Jim Fitzpatrick
- Julie Glass
- Suzy Hotrod
- Hydra
- Annis Jensen
- Charlie O'Connell
- Ivanna S. Pankin
- Tim Patten
- Ronnie Robinson
- Maria Rodriguez-Gregg
- Mo Sanders
- Chloé Seyrès
- Judy Sowinski
- Bonnie Thunders
- Ralph Valladares
- Joan Weston

== Artistic, Rhythm & Jam Roller skaters ==
=== Argentina ===
- Giselle Soler

=== American ===
- Bill Butler (skater), inventor of jam skating, "Godfather of Roller Disco", and choreographer of 2005 film Roll Bounce
- The Village Wizards: Marion Green, Tony Jackson, Michael Belgrave, Julio Estien, Gail King, Pam Mitchell, Sheila Reid
- Khalil Kain
- Anthony Forde & Jeanne Moss
- Scott Randolph aka "Slow Motion"
- Jim Bray, co-star of Roller Boogie (1979)

=== Brazil ===
- Bruna Wurts

=== Russia ===
- Anastasia Nosova
