= History of roller derby =

Development of a sport played on roller skates

The history of roller derby traces the evolution of roller skating races into a unique sport which underwent several boom-and-bust cycles throughout the 20th century. Although it was a form of sports entertainment for much of its existence, a grassroots, early 21st century revival spearheaded by women has restored an emphasis on athleticism.

== Origins ==
=== Endurance races ===
The growing popularity of roller skating in the United States led to the formation of organized endurance races as early as 1884, when skater Victor W. Clough skated 100 miles over the course of nearly ten hours in Geneseo, Illinois. In March 1885, a six-day "go-as-you-please" competition was staged at Madison Square Garden in New York City, with 36 skaters competing for $500 in prize money. Two deaths resulted from the six-day race: both the winner, William Donovan, and skater Joseph Cohen died shortly after the race was completed. Though the inquest that resulted from Cohen's death led to a recommendation for a law prohibiting roller skating activities exceeding four hours in length, a second six-day race was announced in May 1885.

The popularity of roller skate racing, including endurance events, continued in the early 20th century. Races routinely featured amateur skaters as well as professionals, some of whom toured as troupes. Due to rowdiness at some events, including tripping and pushing, speed roller skating acquired a reputation for being something less than a legitimate sport. The International Skating Union of America, a competitor of the International Skating Union, formed in 1907 partly in response. This network of regional associations lasted 20 years, organized championship races, and established rules that prohibited rough play.

Although tripping and pushing may not have been allowed at certain events, popular speed and endurance races continued to be held on both flat and banked tracks in the century's first three decades. Among these races was an 8.5-mile roller marathon organized in 1908 by a group of Chicago rink owners, a 24-hour endurance championship held in Milwaukee in 1913, and a 24-hour banked track race held at Madison Square Garden in 1914. The New York Times noted that the crowd at Madison Square Garden enjoyed the sudden sprints and spills during the event's preliminary races.

The term derby, meaning a race or multi-race event, appeared in the press as early as 1922, when the Chicago Tribune announced and reported on the results of two "roller derby" events held that year. These were multi-day events during which various roller skating races were held on a flat track at Chicago's Broadway Armory.

=== Seltzer's walkathons ===
In 1929, as the Great Depression began, struggling film publicist Leo Seltzer (1903–1978) observed that cash prize-awarding dance marathons among out-of-work contestants and spectators were undermining attendance at his Oregon cinema chain, so he sought ways to capitalize on the trend. Seltzer began holding his own dance marathons, dubbed "walkathons" since contestants usually ended up just shuffling around for the duration of the contests, which could run as long as 40 days. Hundreds of unemployed people participated, hoping to win cash prizes. The contests were emceed by celebrities like Frankie Laine and Red Skelton, and grossed $6 million in three years. Seltzer held his first commercial walkathon in 1931 in Denver, Colorado, then held 22 more, grossing $2 million before retiring, citing that the events had become "vulgar."

In 1933, Seltzer moved his family to Chicago, Illinois and began booking events at the Chicago Coliseum.

=== Transcontinental Roller Derby ===
In 1935, the novelty of walkathons had worn off, but a roller skating fad arose again. According to folklore, Seltzer read an article in Literary Digest magazine that said ninety-three percent of Americans roller skated at least once in their lives. While discussing the article with regular patrons at Ricketts, a restaurant in Chicago's Near North Side, Seltzer was challenged to invent a sport incorporating roller skating. Jotting his ideas onto a tablecloth, he decided to combine then-popular six-day bicycle races and roller skating. Some sources give co-credit for the idea to Leo's brother Oscar.

In August of that year, Seltzer organized his own Transcontinental Roller Derby, an event more than a month long. Staged at the Chicago Coliseum, it was a simulation of a cross-country roller skating race in which 25 two-person (male-female) teams circled a wooden, oval, banked track thousands of times, skating 11½ hours a day, to cover 3,000 miles, the distance between Los Angeles and New York City. Team standings were indicated by multicolored lights tracking their imaginary progress on a large map of the United States. Teams were disqualified if both members were off the track during skating times. Sixteen teams dropped out due to injuries or exhaustion, but nine teams finished, and the winning team, Clarice Martin and Bernie McKay, held the lead for the last 11 days of the event. Although Seltzer's spectacle had elements of originality, a U.S. District Court, ruling against Seltzer when he sued a competitor in 1938, found that the marathon roller race concept had long been in the public domain, so Seltzer couldn't claim copyright violation.

Following the first event's success, Seltzer took the Transcontinental Roller Derby on the road, holding similar races throughout the U.S. with a portable track that reportedly cost $20,000. Daily crowds averaged 10,000 in number, with spectators paying 10 to 25 cents admission. These races were billed as covering "4,000 miles" even though the simulated route was still about 3,000, covering the distance from San Diego to New York City. Contestants were the winners of elimination races in Seltzer's Transcontinental Roller Derby Association, which in September 1935 already had 3,000 members, paying $2 each, at 1,600 rinks. By early 1936, Seltzer had selected a group of teams who competed in Chicago, Miami, Louisville, and Detroit. Skaters in these races only had to skate 8 hours nightly, but were encouraged to engage in "jams" and, at specific times, 5-minute sprints referred to in event programs as "open house". Later that year, Transcontinental Roller Derby debuted in New York at the New York Hippodrome, simulating a 21-day "short course" from Salt Lake City to New York. Appearances at the Pan Pacific Auditorium in Los Angeles, California attracted celebrities such as W.C. Fields, Mickey Rooney, Eddie Cantor, George Burns, Gracie Allen, Jack Benny, Milton Berle, Cary Grant and Eleanor Powell.

Occasionally, massive collisions and crashes occurred as skaters tried to lap those who were ahead of them. In 1936, 1937, or 1938 (sources vary), after seeing a match in Miami and realizing this was an exciting element of the sport, sportswriter Damon Runyon encouraged Seltzer to tweak the game to maximize physical contact between the skaters, including elbowing, "whipping", and slamming each other into the track's outer rail, as well as exaggerating hits and falls. Seltzer bristled, wanting to keep the sport legitimate, but agreed to the experiment, which fans ended up loving.

In the Depression's later years, some cities hosted the Derby's "short course" engagements, simulating semi-transcontinental distances. Points were accumulated on behalf of three "factions", each named for a color (Black, White, or Green) and consisting of five two-person teams skating in 15-minute shifts. With all three factions on the track at the same time, two teams frequently banded together to rout the third. A more sporting variety followed, with just two teams being named after Indian tribes. This, too, was short-lived. The two-team concept survived, but teams were built around the idea of there always being a "home team" named for wherever the match was being played, even though the skaters were always the same people. By 1939, the organization had four pairs of teams touring the country at the same time, always billed as the home team versus either New York or Chicago. The format of two five-person teams on the track at the same time, with a team scoring points when its members lap members of the other team, is the basic premise of roller derby to this day.

=== Charter bus disaster ===
On March 24, 1937, 21 members of a touring group of Roller Derby skaters and support personnel were killed when their chartered bus blew a tire while going 40 mph down a hill on U.S. Route 50, collided with a bridge abutment, rolled onto its side and burst into flames, trapping passengers inside. The accident occurred near Salem, Illinois, as the bus was en route from St. Louis to Cincinnati for another performance. Only a few of the 23 passengers escaped the burning wreckage, and two of them died later from their injuries, bringing the total fatalities to 19 or 20 (sources vary). The disaster nearly put Seltzer out of business, but replacement skaters were signed and Roller Derby survived. As a tribute to those killed in the disaster, the number "1" was permanently retired for all Roller Derby teams.

=== WWII era ===
In Los Angeles, Roller Derby was broadcast on the radio as early as 1939.

Transcontinental Roller Derby rapidly grew in popularity as a spectator sport. Matches were held in fifty cities in 1940, for more than five million spectators, some of whom formed fan clubs and newsletters like Roller Derby News (later renamed RolleRage). Teams began to represent and compete in other U.S. cities, although some teams were actually the same traveling group that would just change names depending on where they were playing, and all were part of the Seltzer-owned Roller Derby league. The league's own estimates of audiences for 1941 were comparable, with four million Midwestern spectators in 20 cities being claimed.

The entry of the United States into World War II at the end of 1941 interrupted the sport's ascent; many skaters enlisted in the armed forces, crowds dwindled, and the fledgling league was reduced to one team skating mainly for the entertainment of soldiers. After the war's end in 1945, Seltzer successfully resumed growing the sport, although a 1946 attempt to bring it to New York's Polo Grounds failed due to twelve straight days of rain.

=== Television ===
At 8:30 P.M. on November 29, 1948, Roller Derby debuted on New York television, beginning a 13-week run on the CBS-TV network, broadcasting at a time well before television was in widespread use. The first televised matches were between teams representing New York and Brooklyn, and took place at the 69th Regiment Armory four nights a week, which was actually a reduction from the troupe's usual touring schedule that included a performance every day, sometimes with two on Sundays. Although few people owned TVs at that time, broadcasts could be seen on sets in bars and storefront windows. The fledgling medium allowed underwhelming audience sizes to be made to look like they had packed venues to capacity, leading spectators to turn out in droves for subsequent matches. Armory crowds began in the low hundreds, but were soon in the five to seven thousand range. Then in June 1949, Seltzer secured an appearance at Madison Square Garden before a cumulative crowd of 55,000 over a five-day period.

Early stars of Roller Derby after its debut on TV included Carl 'Moose' Payne, Monta Jean Payne, Ken Monte, Bert Wall, and the temperamental Midge "Toughie" Brasuhn. Skater salaries were about $200 to $260 a week, established by a players' association.

Meanwhile, from 1946 through 1948, flat-track roller derby (of the skating marathon variety) was enjoyed as an intramural sport at the University of British Columbia in Canada.

For the 1949–1950 season, Seltzer opened franchise teams and formed the National Roller Derby League (NRDL). The NRDL consisted of six teams: the New York Chiefs, the Brooklyn Red Devils, the Jersey Jolters, the Philadelphia Panthers, the Washington-Baltimore Jets, and the Chicago Westerners. The Jolters played at Armories in Newark, Jersey City, Teaneck, and Paterson. The Westerners played in Chicago, but also in Columbus, Ohio and Miami, Florida. The Red Devils had no venue in Brooklyn, and were essentially a road team, often cast as villains. NRDL season playoffs sold out Madison Square Garden for a week.

Also in 1949, when the CBS contract expired, broadcasting was taken over by ABC, and games were televised live throughout the United States. The contract with ABC lasted until Seltzer negotiated its termination in 1951 over scheduling disputes.

Between 1949 and 1951, Seltzer's organization grossed $2.5 million, bolstered by Madison Square Garden appearances in 1950 and 1951 that set five-day records of 77,000 and 82,000, respectively. In this period, Seltzer also sold the Jolters to an outside syndicate. Skater salaries, negotiated by an informal players' union, were around $250 a week, with $35 and $60 bonuses for captains and player-coaches.

=== Increasing legitimacy ===
The players wanted to skate "phony" during this time period, but Seltzer believed the public would soon tire of exaggerated hits and falls, so he embarked on a campaign to legitimize the sport. He started a program encouraging the formation of junior Roller Derby leagues for children (although it's not clear whether any actually formed), he sought to add more teams nationwide (although it didn't happen until 1954), and he got the players to agree to a "no railing" rule. In a show of commitment, Seltzer invoked the rule to suspend star skater Midge "Toughie" Brasuhn, much to her chagrin, for allegedly shoving another skater into the track's outer railing, even though the play had been faked by the other skater. By the early 1950s, Roller Derby coaches were even betting on the outcomes of matches, another sign of legitimacy, according to Seltzer. Players later pointed to injuries and low-scoring games as evidence of legitimacy, as well, but even into the 1970s, Roller Derby players engaged in a degree of showmanship and staged theatrics for dramatic and comic effect.

== Jam On, Jam Off ==
After terminating the contract with ABC in 1951, Seltzer negotiated a deal with General Motors to sponsor the broadcast of games on NBC. The deal fell through when, according to Seltzer, General Motors, fuming over an NCAA decision preventing them from sponsoring the broadcast of University of Notre Dame football games, lost interest in televising any sports at all. A handful of independent TV stations continued to broadcast games, but the loss of network broadcasting caused fan interest to plummet. Madison Square Garden no longer wanted to host matches, fan clubs disbanded, and Seltzer returned to pursuing real estate interests. At some point, Seltzer changed his residence to Encino (Los Angeles) a westward move that foreshadowed changes to come.

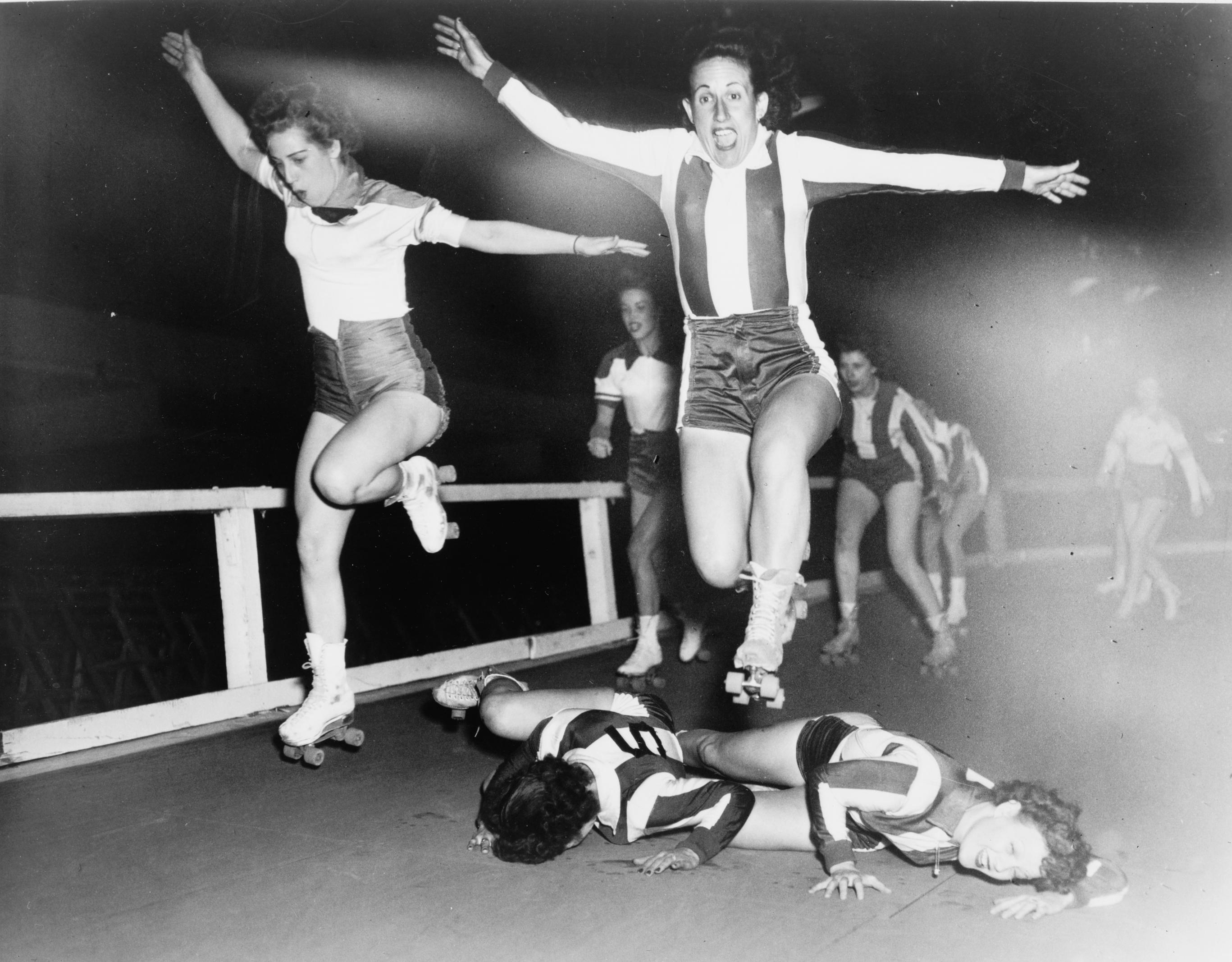
Skaters leap over two who have fallen.

In July 1953, citing the effects of the Korean War and a dearth of venues, Leo Seltzer moved the Derby from New York to Los Angeles and created the L.A. Braves for their debut at the Rose Bowl. The Braves became the first international team when a tour of Europe was launched in 1953.

However, this was not the first time audiences outside the U.S. had seen the game played live. A separate organization, International Roller Speedway, known in some countries as Roller-Catch, formed in 1937 and toured Europe, where they played at the Harringay Arena in London, and the Philippines. Roller Speedway was a modified version of the sport and normally featured two teams, representing Europe (the "home" team) and USA. The 1950 film The Fireball, starring Mickey Rooney, was based on the life of one of the league's stars, Eddie Poore, who skated under the name Eddie Cazar. Roller Speedway ceased operations in 1952.

In 1954, the Derby established the most fabled team in the history of the sport, the longtime champion San Francisco Bay Bombers. Stars on this team eventually included Charlie O'Connell, Joanie Weston, and Ann Calvello.

In his keynote address at the 2007 roller derby convention RollerCon, Leo's son Jerry Seltzer revealed that at its peak in the 1950s, the National Roller Derby League had just 83 skaters spread among its six teams.

In 1958, weary of Roller Derby's off-air struggle — by this time, crowds at San Francisco's Cow Palace had dwindled to two hundred or less — Leo transferred Roller Derby to his son Jerry. Jerry soon struck a deal with independent Oakland TV station KTVU to broadcast Roller Derby matches kinescoped in a deserted garage.

=== In the 1960s ===
In 1960, KTVU switched to the visually and technically superior videotape format for recording games for broadcast. One of Roller Derby's sponsors, a San Francisco auto dealer, got a Portland, Oregon TV station to broadcast an unedited tape of a match, in an attempt to advertise the dealership's new lot in the area. To his surprise, Jerry Seltzer received three hundred letters asking for Roller Derby to come to Portland, so he obliged and the Derby made an appearance before 9,000 fans. Realizing he had stumbled onto a promotional formula, he began syndicating videotapes of games to more independent TV stations, and followed up broadcasts with personal appearances of the Derby in each city. In 1961, forty stations carried Derby. Several years later, UHF TV stations, mostly independent and desperate to compete with older, network-dominated VHF counterparts, snatched up broadcasting rights for their areas. Although TV exposure was an important component of Roller Derby's revitalization, Seltzer didn't want to repeat the experience of mainstream professional sports organizations that had become dependent on TV; he used the medium only for exposure and publicity for the live matches, not a source of revenue for player salaries.

Jerry Seltzer also changed some of the rules. For the first time, skaters were required to wear helmets, and, at the behest of KTVU television announcer Walt Harris, he made the game more TV-friendly by making jammers' helmets easier to spot.

A more theatrical imitation called Roller Games was started in 1961 in Los Angeles featuring retired Roller Derby skaters who chose not to make the move to San Francisco. Owned by Bill Griffiths, Sr. and Jerry Hill, Roller Games was the only viable rival organization to the original Roller Derby and actually consisted of several separate leagues, including the (U.S.) National Roller Derby (NRD), soon renamed to National Roller League (NRL) since the "Roller Derby" trademark was aggressively protected by the Seltzer organization. The NRD/NRL consisted of the Northern Hawks (sometimes billed as the Chicago Hawks), New York Bombers, Texas Outlaws, Detroit Devils, Los Angeles Thunderbirds (nicknamed "T-Birds"), and Philadelphia Warriors (sometimes billed as the Eastern Warriors).

There were also several attempts in markets that failed quickly, with teams such as the Baltimore/Washington-based Mid Atlantic War Cats, the Florida Jets, and the Western Renegades. Roller Games also encompassed the Canadian National Roller League (CNRL) and Japanese National Roller League (JNRL). Some former Roller Derby stars found new fame in the Roller Games, and a handful of skaters simply went back and forth between the two organizations. After 1968, however, the Roller Derby to Roller Games defections were quite few; instead, a handful of Roller Games skaters returned to their roots and began skating for the Derby again.

1961 or so also saw the advent of a short-lived New York City area rival league, the American Skating Derby (ASD), promoted by Joe Morehouse and Mike O'Hara. ASD debuted two teams of ex-Roller Derby skaters — one team representing "New York" and the other representing Brooklyn — at Long Island Arena in Commack, New York, around April 1961, with plans to appear throughout the Tri-State Region. A league split later that year resulted in the formation of another league, the Eastern Skating Derby (ESD), which lasted until mid-1964 and skated only in New York, sometimes at the same venues as the ASD.

In 1962, Jerry, in partnership with his uncle Oscar Seltzer (who had founded the Roller Derby Skate Corporation in 1936), created the Dixie Devils, a "home" team for the Southern United States cities of Nashville, Atlanta, Jacksonville and Orlando. Ronnie Robinson, son of boxer Sugar Ray Robinson, was designated the team's star player. Dixie Devils games had to be recorded with kinescope, when TV audiences had already grown accustomed to the relatively clean, clear appearance of videotape, and the result was disastrous; no loyal TV audiences were grown, fan attendance was low, and the venture folded after one month. Seltzer remained fond of the idea of regionalization, however, and envisioned his organization eventually becoming more like other sports leagues, with teams being independently owned and operated, and with the teams being associated with regions (South, Northeast, Mideast, Midwest, Central South, Southwest Plains, and West) rather than individual cities.

The ASD, ESD, and Dixie Devils, much like Roller Speedway, aren't remembered today by anyone outside the most dedicated fans and the skaters who participated in them. To the media, there was only one Roller Derby. From Jerry Seltzer's takeover in the late 1950s, the game reached new heights of popularity with a 120-station television network where taped games from the Bombers' home, Kezar Pavilion in San Francisco, were shown weekly. Television made fans of thousands and the Bay Bombers packed arenas from coast to coast on cross country tours, regularly selling out arenas such as Madison Square Garden, Boston Garden, Kiel Auditorium in St. Louis and dozens more. In 1969, television viewership of Roller Derby peaked with approximately 15 million viewers each week.

Two other developments in 1960s Roller Derby were profit sharing and annual contracts for skaters; many skaters previously held day jobs to supplement their income, or were only employed as athletes for part of the year.

=== In the 1970s ===
The attendance record of 19,507 for a roller derby bout held at an indoor arena was set at Madison Square Garden in 1971. The all-time attendance record of 50,118 for any roller derby event was set on September 15, 1972 at an interleague match between the Los Angeles Thunderbirds of Roller Games (National Skating Derby) and the Midwest Pioneers of Roller Derby (International Roller Derby League) held at Comiskey Park in Chicago, an outdoor stadium. The final score of the game was Pioneers 82, T-Birds 79.

At this point, the Bay Bombers home-team concept was duplicated with the New York Chiefs representing the Eastern U.S. and the Pioneers based in Chicago (but really everything west of Pennsylvania). A one-season run in 1971 by the Cincinnati Jolter team in the Midwest (Ohio, Kentucky, and other areas) was not financially successful, and the team became a road franchise once again. The Bombers were briefly a Southwest team moved from the Bay Area, but potential new owners couldn't come to terms with the Seltzer family and so the Bay Bombers were returned home. (In an unusual move, the Chiefs were a "replacement" team for the Bombers during the period that franchise was supposedly based in Texas.)

In 1973, high overhead and other factors led Jerry Seltzer to elect to shut down Roller Derby. In a 2005 interview, Ann Calvello mentioned gas shortages during the 1973 oil crisis as a contributing factor because teams could not travel. Some of the IRDL star skaters were recruited to skate for Roller Games' International Skating Conference (ISC), which quickly eliminated all Derby teams except for the Chiefs to again focus on the Los Angeles Thunderbirds. However, within two years, Roller Games' wrestling/circus-like approach doomed that organization; many Roller Derby skaters quit and fans deserted the arenas. Cultural historian Paul Fussell, perhaps editorializing, attributed the collapse of the sport to the declining economic class of its fan base in its final years; fans were ultimately unable to support the sponsors that had been keeping the sport on television.

Top players in the USA included Judy Arnold, Darlene Anderson and Peggy and Bob Sumsky.

== 1970s–1990s revivals ==
Several attempts were made to revive the sport in the late 1970s through the 1990s.

=== IRSL ===
The only reasonably successful of these was the International Roller Skating League (IRSL), operational from April 24, 1977 to December 12, 1987. IRSL games were held mostly in Northern California, but a handful of games were skated in the Northeastern United States, the Midwest, and Canada. Many skaters from Roller Derby were in the IRSL, and some of the team names were the same as in Roller Derby.

Initially the league was composed of the San Francisco Bay Bombers, the Midwest Pioneers, the Brooklyn Red Devils and the Manhattan Chiefs. In 1979, one of the league owners, former San Francisco television producer Dave Lipschultz, bought and restructured it. He added two more teams, the Northeast Braves and Southern Jolters (later renamed the Southern Stars), and renamed the Chiefs as the New York Dynamite and, eventually, the Eastern Express. A final team, the Northern Knights, representing Canada, was announced in 1986 but never competed. As before, most of the attention was centered on the Bay Bombers. After skating primarily in Northern California, a Midwest tour was launched in 1984, but flopped due to competition from baseball and football as well as weather-related problems. In 1986, a tournament was carried on ESPN and the IRSL set up sporadic appearances in New York. ESPN dropped the contract in its pursuit of the more lucrative professional football market, and although talks were underway to broadcast IRSL matchups on USA Network, the IRSL was unable to survive without television support. Lipshultz shut down the league after its last game at Madison Square Garden on December 12, 1987. Around that time, Lipschultz and skaters were negotiating over how to keep it going. Lipschultz wanted to make it more like professional wrestling in an attempt to win over a fickle TV audience, but the players had different ideas. No agreement was reached, and potential sponsors lost interest.

The 1985 IRSL matches have been shown twice on ESPN Classic's sports comedy show Cheap Seats, as ESPN retains the right to air those matches.

American Skating Derby, promoting the game as Rollerjam!, formed in 1987 and played a spring season with two teams, the San Francisco Slammers and the Los Angeles Turbos. The name American Skating Derby was the same as the early 1960s New York-based league, but was unrelated. Composed of inactive Roller Derby and IRSL skaters, the 1987 ASD was formed primarily as a means to keep the game alive, and the two teams (with the Slammers being essentially replaced by the Bay City Bombers) skated around Northern California communities for high school charities. For the next decade, with sometimes as few as one game annually, the ASD attempted to keep the traditional game going.

=== RollerGames ===

RollerGames, created in 1989 by two television producers, David Sams and Michael Miller, and Roller Games owner Bill Griffiths, Sr., was a U.S. television show that presented a theatrical version of the sport of roller derby for a national audience. It featured a steeply banked figure-eight track, an alligator pit, and a number of skaters who had been in the Roller Games league, as well as younger participants. The six teams were the T-Birds, Violators, Bad Attitude, Rockers, Hot Flash, and Maniacs. The show only lasted thirteen weeks despite garnering over a 5 national rating during its prime-time debut, and was in the top 25 of all syndicated shows for the season—even beating the popular American Gladiators.

Announcers were Chuck Underwood, David Sams, and Shelly Jamison. Halftime commentary was provided by Wally George.

=== World Roller Federation ===
For one season in the Spring of 1990, the World Roller Federation, a banked track league, produced a television show called WRF Express. Terry Sal was the play-by-play announcer and Joan Weston provided color commentary. The teams in the league were the California Fire, Miami Renegades, New York Thunder, Cincinnati Lightning, Dallas Bandits and Detroit Blaze. The skaters were primarily veterans and fan-recognizable stars of either Roller Derby or Roller Games. Team coaches included Buddy Atkinson Jr., Ann Calvello, Nick Scopas, John Parker and John Hall. The ruleset used included one helmeted jammer per team, no helmets for the four blockers with no pivot skater, with 60 seconds of jam time unless the lead jammer called off the jam, and the skaters wait at the starting line for the referee's whistle to start each jam rather than the skaters having a rolling start.

=== RollerJam ===

Between January 1999 and January 2001, Knoxville, Tennessee television impresarios Ross K. Bagwell Sr. and Stephen Land, under the name Pageboy Entertainment, collaborated with CBS to stage another televised revival known as RollerJam or Roller Jam. Bagwell and Land recruited numerous stars from the Roller Derby of yesteryear, as well as newer stars from various athletic backgrounds, including nationally ranked speed skaters, to skate in the six-team World Skating League (WSL). Jerry Seltzer was named RollerJam "commissioner".

RollerJam games were televised out of "RollerJam Arena," on the grounds of Universal Studios in Orlando, Florida. Initial teams, each consisting of seven men and seven women, were the New York Enforcers, the California Quakes, the Florida Sundogs, the Nevada Hot Dice, the Texas Rustlers and the Illinois Riot (Original names of the latter three teams were the Las Vegas High Rollers, Texas Twisters, and Illinois Inferno. These names were changed prior to the start of the first season). Despite strong funding and four seasons of broadcasts on The Nashville Network (TNN, now known as Spike TV), the venture never became a "live" attraction. After MTV's takeover of the CBS Cable group, fabricated storylines and uncharismatic characters were being featured more than actual competitive skating. This did not go over well with many skaters or die-hard roller derby fans. Two notable veterans from Roller Games, Rockin' Ray Robles and Patsy Delgado, were featured in the second season of RollerJam. When RollerJam was cancelled, many of the skaters found smaller leagues in which to skate. Forty episodes of Roller Jam have been reversioned for UK television after successful broadcasts in other countries. Airing from October 2, 2006, on Challenge TV much of the narrative has been removed with sex and violence toned down for a family audience.

One major rule difference between previous leagues was the legalisation of in-line skates, which the WSL required for younger players in an attempt to push the league to younger players, more familiar with the in-line game, allowing for more precision skating over the traditional quads, allowing faster skaters to participate. Unfortunately, in-lines unlike quads, afforded little lateral mobility thus hampering the skaters ability to block effectively.

== Roller Derby: A Dramatic Exhibition of Sports Entertainment ==
The Roller Derby was a carefully constructed and popular form of sports entertainment that evolved over time, revealing the ways in which theatricality, predetermined outcomes, and captivating personalities were woven into the fabric of the game, ultimately defining its appeal.

One of the most telling aspects of Roller Derby's entertainment-centric nature was the deliberate cultivation of drama. The legendary announcer of Roller Games Dick Lane famously referred to the spectacle as a "dramatic exhibition," a phrase that perfectly encapsulates the staged conflicts and heightened emotions that were central to the Roller Derby experience. These weren't just games; they were narratives played out on wheels, complete with heroes, villains, and cliffhanger moments. In addition to Roller Games, in 1973 the Roller Derby league had also acknowledged that their event was an exhibition.

This manufactured drama was further amplified by the concept of skaters skating "red." Skating "red" signified a heightened state of aggression, often involving blatant fouls and physical altercations that went beyond the typical rough-and-tumble nature of the sport. This wasn't always spontaneous; rather, it was often a deliberate act to inject excitement and fuel the ongoing storylines. Even the most beloved stars, the fan favorites who embodied skill and charisma, would occasionally skate "red," much to the shock and delight of the audience. This blurring of the lines between athlete and performer was a key element of Roller Derby's entertainment value, keeping fans engaged and invested in the unfolding drama.

The manipulation of game outcomes was another significant aspect of Roller Derby's identity as sports entertainment. The preference for the home team to always win, unless the road team needed to win for storyline purposes, underscores the degree to which results were dictated by narrative considerations rather than pure athletic merit. This predictability, while perhaps anathema to traditional sports purists, was a crucial element in maintaining fan interest and building long-term storylines. The victories and defeats served the overarching drama, fueling rivalries and setting the stage for future confrontations.

Despite the emphasis on entertainment, one must acknowledge the genuine athleticism of many Roller Derby skaters. While the training might not have adhered to the rigorous, specialized regimens of traditional sports, the demands of skating at high speeds, navigating a banked track, and engaging in physical contact required significant strength, agility, and endurance. The best skaters were excellent athletes, possessing remarkable skill and stamina. Stars like Joanie Weston, known for her incredible speed and grace, and the formidable Ann Calvello, whose aggressive style and longevity made her a legendary figure, exemplified this athleticism. These athletes weren't just performers; they were highly skilled individuals operating within a framework that prioritized entertainment.

The top stars of Roller Derby were integral to its success as sports entertainment. They were skilled skaters and also personalities who embodied the narratives played out on the track. Their rivalries, interactions with the audience, and crafted personas were as important as their skating abilities. These stars became figures who drew fans to the arenas and television broadcasts.

While genuine athletic prowess was present, the overarching structure and presentation of Roller Derby were undeniably geared towards captivating and entertaining an audience, solidifying its place as a enduring example of sports' entertainment value.

== Contemporary roller derby ==
=== All-female, grassroots leagues ===
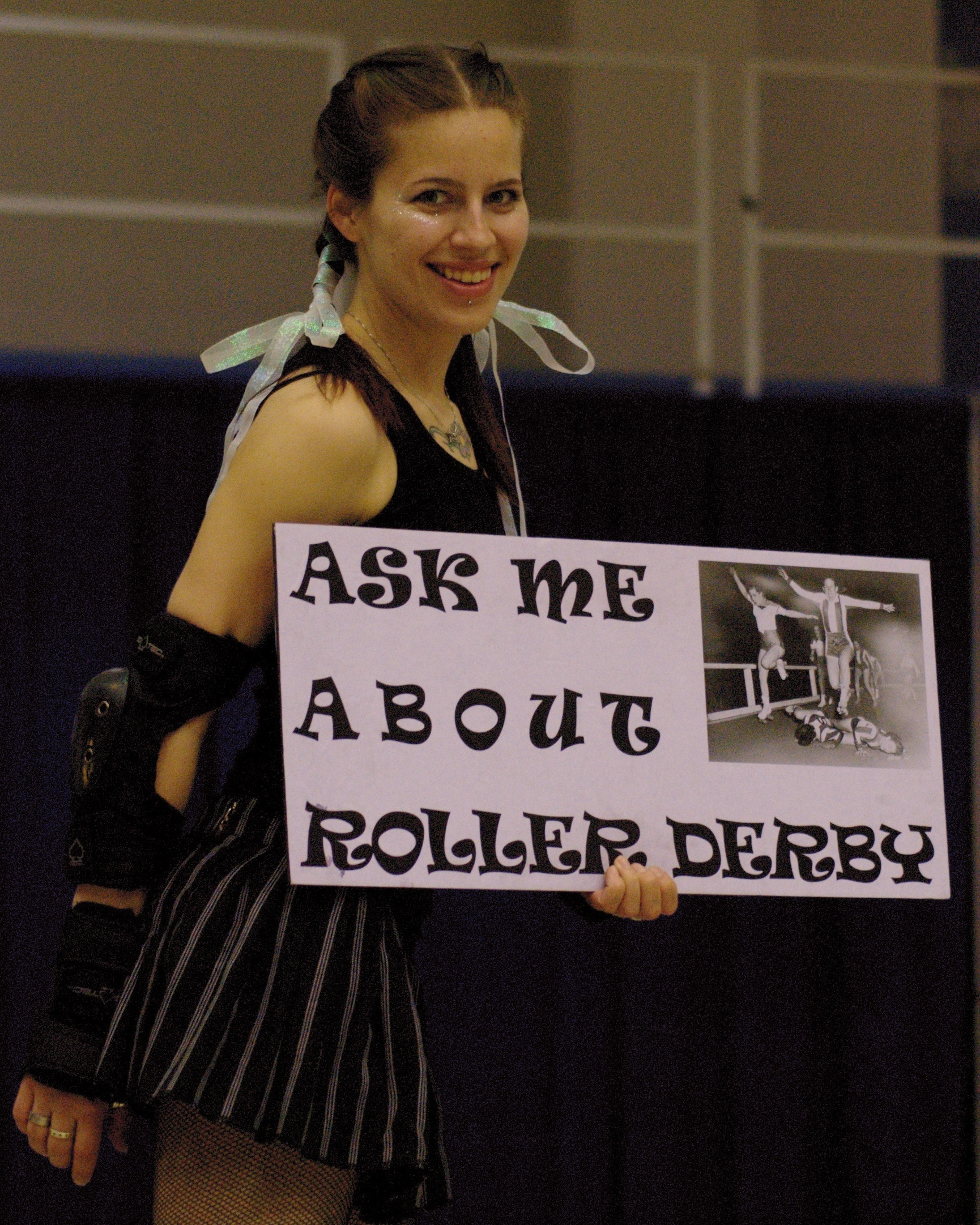
A Blue Ridge Rollergirls skater offers help to novice fans (Asheville, North Carolina).

In 2000, Daniel Eduardo "Devil Dan" Policarpo, then an Austin, Texas musician, recruited women to skate in what he envisioned would be a raucous, rockabilly, circus-like roller derby spectacle. After an organizational meeting and a disputed fundraiser, Policarpo and the women parted ways. The women then self-organized as Bad Girl Good Woman Productions (BGGW) in 2001, creating a new generation of roller derby, open to women only. Founders formed four teams and staged their first public match in Austin in mid-2002. Shortly after, the league split over business plans: The Texas Rollergirls embraced flat-track play, while the BGGW league took the name TXRD Lonestar Rollergirls and went on to skate banked-track roller derby.

The revival then began in earnest, with over 50 similar all-female leagues in existence by late 2005, more than 80 by February 2006, and more than 135 by mid-August 2006. The sport's sudden growth in 2006 is attributed to its exposure via the Rollergirls reality television show, which depicted portions of the lives of real skaters from the TXRD Lonestar Rollergirls. The show began broadcasting in January 2006 but was not picked up for a second season due to unsatisfactory ratings.

Leagues outside the U.S. began forming in 2006, and international competition soon followed. The first all-female Canadian league of 10 members, the Oil City Derby Girls, was formed in December 2005 in Edmonton, Alberta. Terminal City Rollergirls from Vancouver, British Columbia, appeared before an audience of 4500 on March 4, 2006 to participate in a game of "Last Woman Standing" ("Blood and Thunder") against the Rat City Rollergirls at the Everett Events Center in Everett, Washington. The first full, international bout in women's flat-track derby occurred in December 2006, when the Oil City Derby Girls hosted the Rocky Mountain Roller Girls (Denver, Colorado). By mid-2009, there were 425 amateur leagues, including 79 in Canada, Australia, the United Kingdom, New Zealand, Germany, Belgium and Sweden combined.

Although this revival of roller derby was initially all-female, some leagues later introduced all-male teams. Junior roller derby leagues associated with this revival also emerged and play under modified adult derby rules.

=== Men's roller derby ===
The Men's Roller Derby Association (MRDA) is the international governing body of men's flat track roller derby. It was founded in 2007 under the name Men's Derby Coalition (renamed to Men's Roller Derby Association in 2011), and currently has 64 men's leagues under its jurisdiction. MRDA member leagues play using the rules of Flat-Track Roller Derby originally designed by the WFTDA. Despite its name, women and non-binary people may play with MRDA member leagues in accordance with its non-discrimination policy.

=== Mixed-gender, for-profit leagues ===
A handful of leagues, mostly mixed-gender, have origins in earlier incarnations of the sport and heavily promote themselves as professional due to their history, management, membership, style of play and marketing considerations. As of the mid-2000s, most of these leagues do not compete in regular seasons, but rather schedule infrequent special-event games, drawing from a relatively small pool of skaters to form the roster of two teams put together just for the event, or on one team that plays against a similar club from another league. Team names typically pay homage to memorable Roller Derby and Roller Games teams of the past.

=== Increasing use of real names ===
In 2009, some roller derby athletes began using their real names, rather than stage names, in competition. Examples include Team Legit, a pickup team of star skaters from Northwestern USA flat-track leagues playing in a banked track tournament in June 2009, skaters Sarah "Killbox" Hipel (from Detroit Derby Girls) and Julia "Lucy Furr" Rosenwinkel (from Windy City Rollers) now competing under their real names, and 13 members of the Denver Roller Dolls' travel team who began skating under their real names during their 2009 season.

== See also ==
- List of roller derby leagues
