= Jerry Seltzer =

American promoter, final owner of original roller derby league (1932–2019)

- Born: Gerald Edwin Seltzer; June 3, 1932; Portland, Oregon, U.S.
- Died: July 1, 2019 (aged 87); Sonoma, California, U.S.
- Occupation: Promoter
- Known for: roller derby
- Father: Leo Seltzer

Gerald Edwin "Jerry" Seltzer (June 3, 1932 – July 1, 2019) was the second and final owner of the original Roller Derby league. The league and the sport of roller derby were created in 1935 in Chicago by Leo Seltzer, Jerry's father. Jerry assumed ownership of the league in 1959 and ran it until its demise in 1973.

== Early life and education ==
Seltzer attended Stanford University in 1950 and then enrolled at Northwestern University in 1951. He joined the United States Army in March 1954 and went to basic training at Fort Ord, California. As a private first class, he was assigned to Austria, and served in the 430th Counterintelligence Corps detachment. He received a bachelor of science in business administration in 1956 after a stint in the army.

== Roller Derby ==
At one time the league was broadcast on 120 television stations in the United States and Canada, and filled Madison Square Garden, the Oakland Coliseum (34,000, 1971) and Chicago White Sox Park (50,114, Sept 15, 1972).

In 1959, Seltzer moved the operation to the San Francisco Bay Area and established the most fabled team in the history of the sport, the longtime champion San Francisco Bay Bombers. Stars included Charlie O'Connell, Joanie Weston, and Ann Calvello.

== Oakland Seals ==
In 1970, Seltzer attempted to buy the struggling Oakland Seals of the National Hockey League (NHL). Although he put in a better offer and had a more detailed plan for reviving the franchise, and had investors from four of the major franchises in the American Football League, a majority of NHL owners (the "old establishment", not the younger owners or from newer teams) voted to sell the team to Charlie O. Finley, the flamboyant owner of Major League Baseball's Oakland A's. Finley had little luck convincing Bay Area residents that the Seals were a worthwhile attraction, and the team pulled up stakes in 1976, moving to Cleveland, Ohio and later amalgamating with the Minnesota North Stars (now the Dallas Stars).

== BASS Tickets ==
In the 1970s, Seltzer co-founded Bay Area Seating Service (BASS) Tickets, a San Francisco Bay Area computerized ticket service. From 1983 to 1993, he was a vice president of sales and marketing for Ticketmaster. On his return to the Bay Area he joined Bonjourfleurette.com as marketing and sales director and COO. He co-founded the Sonoma Valley Film Festival (now Sonoma Filmfest) and served on a number of community boards, including the Bay Area American Red Cross, and he helped produce the 30th anniversary special for Cecil Williams Glide church. He later was employed by Brown Paper Tickets in sales.

== Later life ==
As of mid-2010, Seltzer was serving as an advisor to gotdibbs.com and working as a volunteer consultant to new amateur roller derby leagues.

Seltzer said that his father had always wanted roller derby to be a legitimate sport, and to be in the Olympics, further adding that with the contemporary grassroots movement of roller derby, including the Women's Flat Track Derby Association (WFTDA), Modern Athletic Derby Endeavor (MADE) and USA Roller Sports (USARS), he thought roller derby could now be an Olympic sport. He is known as "The Commissioner" by some participants in modern roller derby.

Seltzer blogged about his involvement in Roller Derby and the role his father played.

== Death ==
Seltzer died July 1, 2019, of pulmonary fibrosis.

He is buried at Sunset View Cemetery in El Cerrito, California.
