= Ivy King (roller derby) =

Canadian American roller derby skater (1915–2006)

Personal information
- Nationality: Canadian, American
- Born: September 7, 1915
- Died: July 12, 2006 (aged 90)

Sport
- Sport: Roller derby
- Team: Chicago Mohicans
- Turned pro: 1935

Ivy King Imlah (September 7, 1915 – July 12, 2006) was a Canadian American roller derby skater. King was an early star of the roller derby, beginning her career in 1935. She was inducted into the Roller Derby Hall of Fame in 1953.

== Personal life ==
Ivy King was born September 7, 1915, in Toronto. She was one of seven children; their father, a plasterer, was collecting public relief funds in the mid-1930s. In 1935, when the roller derby was first established, King was living on the West Side of Chicago and working at a candy factory wrapping chocolate bars for $4 a week. She visited Leo Seltzer's office to get a job as a skater, telling him that she could "beat any boy or girl in the city."

== Skating career ==
Together with skater Johnny Rosasco, King won the Transcontinental Roller Derby race in 1936. The next year, King again won the Transcontinental race, this time with Wes Aronson in front of a crowd of 10,000 at the Chicago Coliseum. She was captain of the Chicago Mohicans team.

In 1936 King held the speed roller skating record in the quarter mile, half mile, and one mile. In 1936 she broke her own speed skating record when she skated around a banked track in a little over 1 minute and 31 seconds.

King was chosen as the queen of the roller derby in a poll of 35 U.S. cities, along with Johnny Rosasco as king. She gained the nickname "Poison Ivy" and became known for her fierce sportsmanship, her small stature, and her glasses. She was described in a 1939 newspaper article as "fast, fiery and—even as she whirls at thirty-five miles an hour around the green, circular banked skating rink—still bespectacled." The article went on to describe King as "the idol each night of some 9,000 screaming fans, and she receives fan mail from all over the United States." King was forced into retirement due to illness in the early 1940s.

She was inducted into the Roller Derby Hall of Fame in 1953, its second year of existence. The Windy City Rollers named their championship tournament cup the Ivy King Cup in 2005. She was awarded a lifetime achievement award on the 70th anniversary of the Transcontinental Derby.

== Later life and death ==
Soon after her retirement from skating in the early 1940s she married banker Joe Imlah; they were together until his death in 1988.

King died July 12, 2006.
