= Roller Derby Hall of Fame =

Award for notable roller derby players

The Roller Derby Hall of Fame, also known as the National Roller Derby Hall of Fame, was founded in 1952, by the editors of the Roller Derby News paper.

Johnny Rosasco and Josephine "Ma" Bogash were the first two skaters to be inducted into the Hall of Fame. The Hall of Fame was initially displayed at Madison Square Garden, where the home offices of the sport were located. Skaters could only be inducted after their retirement. However, four skaters were inducted and then returned to skating: Ann Calvello, Annis Jensen, Ken Monte and Charlie O'Connell.

When the International Roller Derby League (by then run by Leo Seltzer's son, Jerry) closed in 1973, the Hall of Fame also closed. As a result, several acclaimed skaters who had never retired were not inducted.

In the late 1990s, Roller Derby fan Gary Powers built up a collection of memorabilia. Powers principally built his collection through buying and selling on eBay; further, fomer skaters also donated memorabilia. His collection of Roller Derby memorabilia is the largest in the world. He made contact with former skaters, including Calvello, Gerry Murray, Billy Bogash, Ivy King and Buddy Atkinson, Sr. By early 2004, Powers's house was described by Time Out as an unofficial roller derby hall of fame. In September 2004, it was opened on an official basis, with the permission and blessing of Jerry Seltzer, with Powers named as its Executive Director and Curator. According to Reuters, the re-opened Hall of Fame "not only honors legends of the game but includes memorabilia like jerseys, tickets, and programs, preserving the history of the banked track sport".

The National Roller Derby Hall of Fame & Museum closed in New York City in 2015. It relocated to Palm Springs, California.

== Members ==
Members of the original hall of fame are:

name	role	date inducted
Josephine "Ma" Bogash	skater	1952
Johnny Rosasco	skater	1952
Wes Aronson	skater	1953
Billy Bogash	skater	1953
Ivy King	skater	1953
Peggy O'Neal	skater	1953
Sammy Skobel	skater	1953
Midge "Toughie" Brasuhn	skater	1956
Gerry Murray	skater	1956
Gene Gammon	skater	1959
Charlie Saunders	skater	1959
Tommy Atkinson	skater	1960
Russ "Rosie" Baker	skater	1960
Annis Jensen	skater	1960
Bert Wall	skater	1960
Ken Monte	skater	1963
Buddy Atkinson, Sr.	skater	1965
Hal Janowitz	skater	1965
Bill Reynolds	skater	1965
Charlie O'Connell	skater	1967
Ann Calvello	skater	1968

Since re-opening in 2004, the following additional members have been inducted:

name	role	date inducted
Elmer Anderson	skater	2004
Judy Arnold	skater	2004
Mike Gammon	skater	2004
Johnny Karp	skater	2004
Annabelle "Slugger" Kealey	skater	2004
Julie Patrick	skater	2004
Ronnie Robinson	skater	2004
Judy Sowinski	skater	2004
Ralph Valladares	skater	2004
Joan Weston	skater	2004
Buddy Atkinson, Jr.	skater	2005
George Copeland	skater	2005
Jack "Toddy" Geffinger	skater	2005
Shirley Hardman	skater	2005
Bobbie Johnstone	skater	2005
Joe Nygra	skater	2005
Carl Payne	skater	2005
Monta Jean Payne	skater	2005
Jerry Seltzer	executive	2005
Leo Seltzer	executive	2005
Kathleen "Gene" Vizena	skater	2005
Mary Youpelle	skater	2005
Sid Harnesk	skater	2006
Walt Harris	announcer	2006
Terri Lynch	skater	2006
Russ Massro	skater	2006
Barbara Mateer	skater	2006
Carol Meyer	skater	2006
Kitty Nehls	skater	2006
Freddie Noa	skater	2006
Ken Nydell	announcer	2006
Ronnie Rains	skater	2006
Tony Roman	skater	2006
Jan Vallow	skater	2006
Richard Brown	skater	2007
Jerry Hill	executive	2007
Judi McGuire	skater	2007
Bill Morrissey	referee	2007
Mary Lou Palermo	skater	2007
Jean Porter	skater	2007
Marion "Red" Smartt	skater	2007
Bob Woodberry	skater	2007
Darlene Anderson	skater	2008-2009
Mary Gardner	skater	2008-2009
Bill Griffiths, Sr.	executive	2008-2009
Dick Lane	announcer	2008-2009
Billy Lyons	skater	2008-2009
Paul Milane	skater	2008-2009
Dave Pound	skater	2008-2009
Gertie Scholl	skater	2008-2009
Mary Ciofani	skater	2010
Lydia Clay	skater	2010
Bob Hein	skater	2010
Frank Macedo	skater	2010
Gil Orozco	skater	2010
John Parker	skater	2010
Hazel Roop	skater	2010
Damon Runyon	writer	2010
Loretta Behrens	skater	2012
Dolores Doss	skater	2012
Margie Laszlo	skater	2012
Bob Lewis	skater	2012
Larry Lewis	skater	2012
Bob Satterfield	skater	2012
Frank Deford	writer	2012
Sandy Dunn	skater	2014
Joe Foster	skater	2014
John Hall	skater	2014
Liz Hernandez	skater	2014
Ruberta Mitchell	skater	2014
Cathie Read	skater	2014
Silver Rich	skater	2014
Leroy Gonzales	skater	2016
Bill Groll	skater	2016
Ken Kunzelman	announcer	2016
Norma Rossner	skater	2016
Rosetta Sunders	skater	2016
Nick Scopas	skater	2016
Delores Tucker	skater	2016
