= Jim Fitzpatrick (athlete) =

Jim Fitzpatrick (born April 15, 1959) is an American author, photographer, portrait artist and former athlete in the sport of roller derby. Fitzpatrick, born and raised in San Francisco, California, skated for the San Francisco Bay Bombers, of the International Roller Skating League (IRSL) Roller Derby, the 1977–1987 revival of the sport. Following a number of shoulder separation injuries, he became a league referee.

In 1979 one of Fitzpatrick's photographs, which he took of pro wrestler Don Muraco fighting with Dean Ho at the Cow Palace for Roy Shires' wrestling promotion, was published in Wrestling World Magazine in the Special 1979 Edition. Ring Announcer and writer, Allan Bolte wrote the article entitled "Don Muraco: The Man Fans Love the Hate" which contained Jim's photo that appears on page 47.

In 1980 he skated in an altered version of Roller Derby which combined Roller Derby rules with those of Roller Ball called Roller Superball. This series was held in Luna Park Arena in Buenos Aires, Argentina.

In 1987, he performed Roller Derby stunt skating in an MTV-aired music video for the song "Love Is Not a Game" by McAuley Schenker Group.

He returned to skating in 1993, competing on Team USA in the Roller Game World Cup, held in Tokyo, Japan. Roller Game (created in Japan), inspired by Roller Derby, was a male-only, full-contact, legit sport in which the athletes wore hockey pads and rules were strictly enforced. If one fought, they were ejected from the game. Other rule changes helped simplify the game. Only one team was on offense at a time and only one jammer (potential scorer) was used. Sets were used instead of the traditional periods. The best three out of five sets determined the winner of the game.

In 2005, Calvello contributed many rare photos and clippings from her personal collection to the book Roller Derby Classics…and more! by Jim Fitzpatrick, self-published via Trafford Publishing. She also wrote the foreword to the book.

He is currently the ARSD (American Roller Skating Derby) trainer and the General Manager of the San Francisco Bay Bombers. On October 13, 2007, the Bombers won the ARSD Championships at Kezar Pavilion and Jim was voted 2007 General Manager of the Year.

In 2008 he published his third book, "When I Shot Good & Bad Guys (Who wrestled at the Cow Palace)", through Arena Publishing, Inc. (Standard Copyright License). It's a photo book consisting of wrestling photos taken by Jim during the late 1970s while he worked as the staff photographer for former wrestling promoter Roy Shire's Big Time Wrestling.

On Thanksgiving Day in 2008 the SF Bay Bombers returned to KOFY TV20 - Cable 13 with a one-hour special. Dan Ferrari, Jim Fitzpatrick and Brad Wagner were listed as the Executive Producers for the show. On March 14, 2009 the SF Bay Bombers first game aired and was the highest rated show that day for the age group of 18 to 34 (refer to article below in external links). Ferrari, Fitzpatrick and Wagner are the Executive Producers for the games which will initially air once a month, leading up to a weekly showing.

Jim came in number 2 on the Top 10 Males' list for Movers and Shakers in the July edition of XR News (Roller Skating Magazine). (refer to the link below.)

On Sept 12, 2009 the San Francisco Bay Bombers won the 2008-2009 ARSD Championships at the Cow Palace arena. Fitzpatrick was voted 2008-2009 General Manager of the Year along with Georgia Hase.

Jim appears in the 2009 Roller Derby documentary, "Rolling Thunder" which is part of "The Roller Derby Chronicles", a three-disc DVD retrospective of the golden years of Roller Derby, by Video Service Corp. He was interviewed regarding his involvement in the SF Bay Bombers resurgence.

Jim was interviewed on an episode of ABC7's Emmy award-winning public affairs show, "Beyond the Headlines" by the host, Cheryl Jennings. The program aired in November 2010.

On February 5, 2011 Jim held his first art exhibition at the LC Gallery located in the Westfield Mall in Downtown San Francisco.

On March 19, 2011 the San Francisco Bay Bombers won the 2010-2011 ARSD Championships at Kezar Pavilion in San Francisco. Fitzpatrick was voted 2010-2011 General Manager of the Year.

In April 2011 Fitzpatrick became one of a growing number of former professional athlete who joined the Butkus Foundations' Steroid Education campaign, "I Play Clean". The non profit campaign, founded by NFL Hall of Famer Dick Butkus, focuses on tackling the issue of steroids among high school athletes.

On April 7, 2012 Fitzpatrick held his second art exhibition. It was held at ManCave Memorabilia in San Mateo, CA. Jim displayed some of his works of boxing legend Mike Tyson. Tyson was also on hand, making a scheduled autograph appearance. It was their second time meeting and Fitzpatrick presented Tyson with a portrait he had drawn of Tyson and his family.

In March 2013 Fitzpatrick was one of several artists included in the ebook "Best of Activism in Art - I" by Sarah S. Vati. Along with his biography, several of Jim's drawings were included in the book (ISBN 9781301850259).

On May 15 Jim was one of 60 artists featured in Art Tour International's ATIM's Top 60 Contemporary Artist of 2014. He also received honorable mention for one of his works.

In 2015 he was again selected as one of 60 artists featured in Art Tour International's ATIM's Top 60 Contemporary Artist of 2015 and later in the year, on Oct, 15, 2015, Jim was interviewed for a segment, via Italy, of ATIM's "Heart 2 Art" series by Viviana Puello, the Art Director of Art Tour International Magazine.

Jim was interviewed for TV by Mark Baker of "Game On" regarding his team's long time woman's captain, Lali O and Roller Derby. The show, which aired on Nov 19th, 2015, is a bi-weekly, Comcast Hometown Network program that's aired in the San Francisco Bay Area and focuses on female athletes.

On April 30, 2016 in Pacifica, CA Jim made his debut in Gold Rush Pro Wrestling as Mr. Goldsworth, a butler for pro wrestler Alexander G. Bernard.

On September 12, 2016 some of Jim's old pro wrestling Super 8mm footage he had shot at the Cow Palace during Roy Shire's Big Time Wrestling shows in the late '70's was published (with credits) in a WWE video, "I Did It My Way: The Pat Patterson Story" (WWE Hall of Famer)! https://www.youtube.com/watch?v=lp03sbfWhjY

Jim is mentioned twice in the autobiography (on page 82 and page 208 regarding his efforts to revive the traditional sport of Roller Derby), "The Last 'True' Roller Derby A Memoir". written by former professional skater Larry Smith.

On Oct 20, 2016 Jim was selected as one of 60 artists featured in Art Tour International's ATIM's Top 60 Masters of Contemporary Art 2017.

In November 2016 some of Jim's wrestling photos, taken back in the late 1970s at the famed Cow Palace, along with an interview with him are included in Rock Rims' book "When It Was Big Time: A One Hundred Year History Of Northern California Professional Wrestling" http://whenitwasbigtime.blogspot.com/

Jim appeared in the Fox Business Channel's hit TV show "Strange Inheritance", episode 23 entitled "Roller Derby Queen". The episode was about the Roller Derby inheritance left to him by Roller Derby icon and close friend Ann Calvello. Jerry Seltzer who ran the original Roller Derby league and is the son of Leo Seltzer, the founder of Roller Derby, also appears and is interviewed in show along with former skating legend, Judy Arnold.

Jim is sited in a chapter entitle "Skate Fast and hit Hard San Francisco Bay Bombers and Bay Area Roller Derby" in the 2017 book "San Francisco Bay Area Sports: Golden Gate Athletics, Recreation, and Community (Sports Culture and Society)" (Paperback)by Liberti, Rita, Smith, Maureen *

Jim was once again selected as one of the artists featured by Art Tour International in their ATIM's Top 60 Masters of Contemporary Art 2018.

One of Jim's portraits of actress Lucy Liu appears in Shan Peck's art book "Stars Of The Silver Screen" released on October 15, 2018. Publisher: Independently published (October 15, 2018)

Jim was again selected as one of the artists featured by Art Tour International in their ATIM's Top 60 Masters of Contemporary Art 2019. https://www.arttourinternational.com/jim-fitzpatrick-2-2/

On June 21, 2019 Jim received a special Certificate of Recognition from Congresswoman Jackie Speier for his being selected by ArtTour International earlier in the year and for his efforts to use his art to support others faced with chronic pain. https://www.arttourinternational.com/jim-fitzpatrick-2/

Fitzpatrick was quoted in a Sonoma Index-Tribune article by publisher Emily Charrier on the recent passing of former Roller Derby owner Jerry Seltzer.

Fitzpatrick was interviewed by the New York Times for information on Jerry Seltzer's time with Roller Derby and his life outside the sport. The article was published on July 16, 2019. https://www.nytimes.com/2019/07/16/sports/jerry-seltzer-dead.html

In 2021, Fitzpatrick published Ad-Lib To The Blow Off!: The True Story of Professional Roller Derby, the Outlaw Leagues, the Chicago Mob's Involvement and More! With Barnes&Noble Press. Bill Hill, a former skater, wrote the foreword. On 5/24/21 Dave Meltzer wrote about the book in the Wrestling Observer.

Language: English ISBN 1728816270 ISBN 978-1728816272

Fitzpatrick is married and has two children, and still resides in the San Francisco Bay Area.
