= Annis Jensen =

American roller derby skater

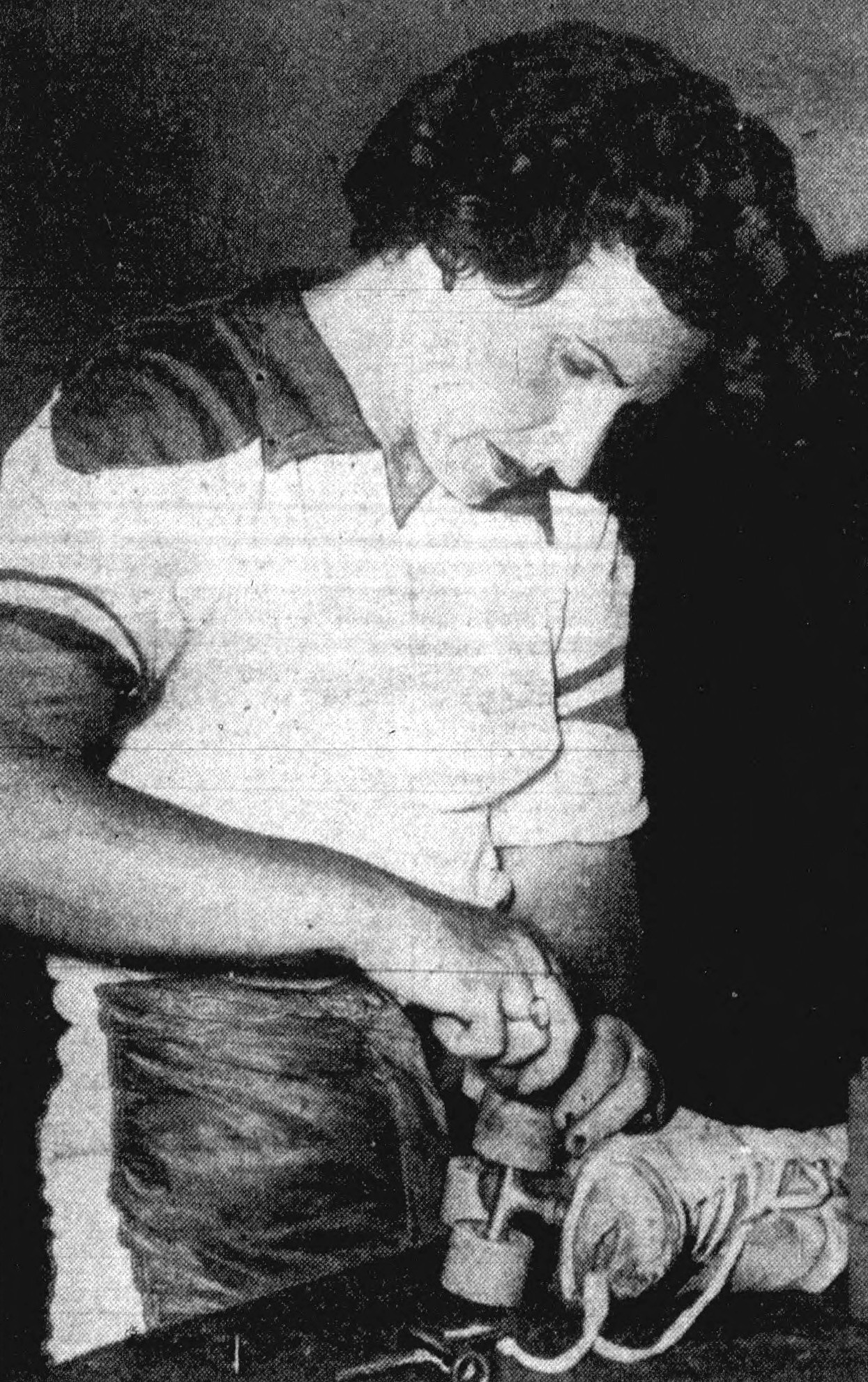
- Jensen, circa 1950

Personal information
- Nickname: Big Red
- Nationality: American
- Born: September 20, 1921
- Died: January 10, 2015 (aged 93)

Sport
- Sport: Roller derby
- Team: San Francisco Bay Bombers
- Turned pro: 1940
- Retired: 1969

Annis "Big Red" Jensen (September 20, 1921 – January 10, 2015) was an American roller derby skater. In 1954, she was the first women's captain of the San Francisco Bay Bombers in the IRDL professional roller derby league. At the time of retirement in 1969, she was the oldest active skater in league history.

In 1960, she was inducted into the Roller Derby Hall of Fame.

She returned to active skating, again with the Bay Bombers, in mid 1974 skating alongside Ann Calvello, Joan Weston, and Jensen's daughter, Barbara Baker.

== Death ==
Annis Jensen died on January 10, 2015, in Arizona, aged 93.
