= Derby (1971 film) =

- Directed by: Robert Kaylor
- Produced by: L.S. Fields (executive producer); William Richert (producer)
- Starring: See below
- Cinematography: Robert Kaylor
- Edited by: Anthony Potenza
- Release date: 22 April 1971
- Running time: 93 minutes
- Country: United States
- Language: English

Derby is a 1971 American documentary film directed by Robert Kaylor about the world of professional roller derby in the 1970s. The film is also known as Roller Derby in the United Kingdom.

== Cast ==
- Ann Calvello as herself
- Lydia Clay as herself
- Janet Earp as herself
- Eddie Krebs as himself
- Charlie O'Connell as himself
- Butch Snell as himself
- Christina Snell as herself
- Mike Snell as himself

== See also ==
- List of American films of 1971
