= Josephine Bogash =

American roller derby skater (1897–1960)

Personal information
- Nationality: American
- Born: March 3, 1897
- Died: December 18, 1960 (aged 63)

Sport
- Sport: Roller derby
- Turned pro: 1935

Josephine V. "Ma" Duda Bogash (March 3, 1897 – December 18, 1960) was an American roller derby skater. Bogash became one of the first stars of the roller derby along with her son, Bill Bogash. She was the first woman inducted into the Roller Derby Hall of Fame in 1952.

== Skating career ==
In August 1935, Bogash attended the Transcontinental Roller Derby race with her husband and 18-year-old son, Billy, at the Chicago Coliseum, each paying a nickel in admission. She had been diagnosed with diabetes in 1929 and her doctor suggested she exercise regularly to help control her weight. She became a "roller rink buff" to manage her diabetes. As her son later recalled, Bogash was unimpressed by the women on the team, saying she could skate as well or better; when tryouts were announced in Chicago the following week, her husband dared her to try out. She was offered a position, but wouldn't go on the road unless her son joined her in the derby. They made their skating debut in September 1935 at the second Transcontinental Roller Derby race, held in Kansas City.

Skater Mary Youpelle described "Ma" Bogash as a mother hen, saying she was "kind of the mature person for the whole Derby, so she looked after the girls. You stayed in your quarters at night, and she told you what to do and what not to do." Youpelle continued, "All of us girls would go to Ma if we had a problem." Bogash would sometimes hide a hatpin in her hair and, when she was sure referees weren't looking, would poke other skaters to get out of a congested jam on the track. She would also angrily reprimand or start a shoving match against skaters who injured her son.

Josephine and Billy Bogash were two of the biggest stars of the early roller derby, with Josephine known as the game's first marquee skater. Billed as "the diabetic housewife," "Ma" Bogash was credited with drawing in a large portion of the female audience, especially housewives and middle-aged women.

In 1952 she was one of the first two people to be inducted into the Roller Derby Hall of Fame, along with fellow skater Johnny Rosasco.

== Personal life and death ==
Josephine V. Duda was born March 3, 1897. She was married to Richard W. Bogash, a Wabash Railroad fireman. Their son Billy Bogash was born in 1916.

Bogash died December 18, 1960, and is buried in Evergreen Cemetery in Evergreen Park, Illinois.

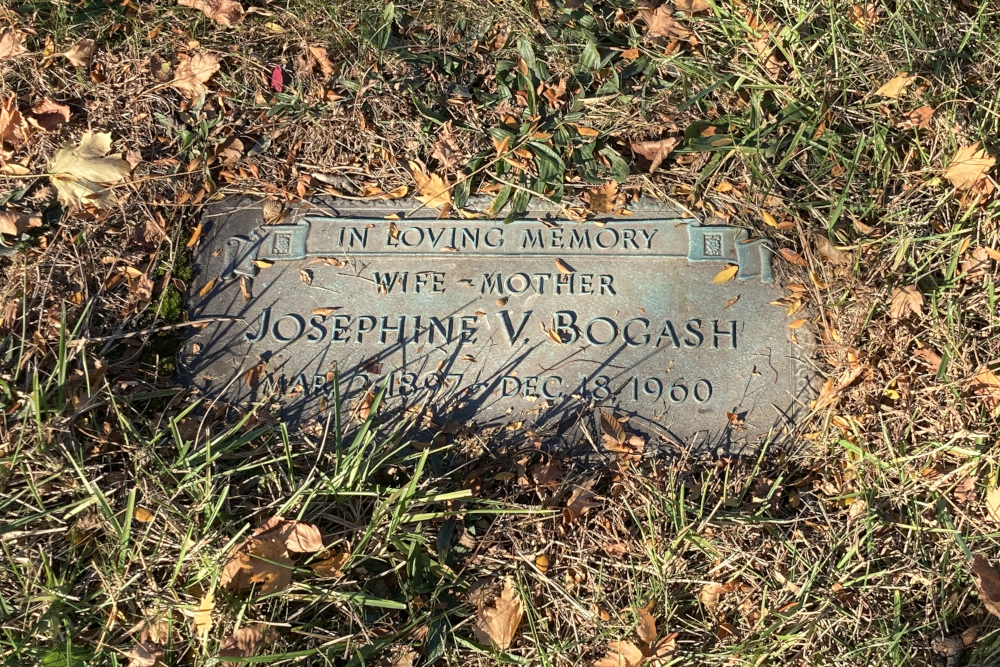
Bogash's grave marker
