= Roller Derby (brand) =

American sporting goods brand

Roller Derby Skate Corp
- Company type: Private
- Industry: Sporting & Recreational Goods
- Founded: 1936
- Headquarters: Litchfield, Illinois, U.S.
- Products: Quad skates, Inline skates, Skating Accessories, Other Sporting Goods
- Website: rollerderby.com

Roller Derby Skate Corp is an American manufacturer and distributor of sporting goods, specializing in quad skates, inline skates, ice hockey skates, skateboards, skating accessories, and recently, through its acquisition of 360 Inc., sporting goods for water sports including body boards, surfboards and swim products. Roller Derby sells products under the brands Roller Derby, California Advanced Sports, Pacer and 360 Inc. It is the second-largest supplier of inline skates to the U.S. market. They have just introduced a skate that is designed for roller derby.

Roller Derby is the largest manufacturer of roller skates in the United States.

== History ==
Company logo

Roller Derby was founded in 1936 by Oscar Seltzer, the brother of Roller Derby pioneer Leo Seltzer, as a manufacturer of boots for roller and ice skates.

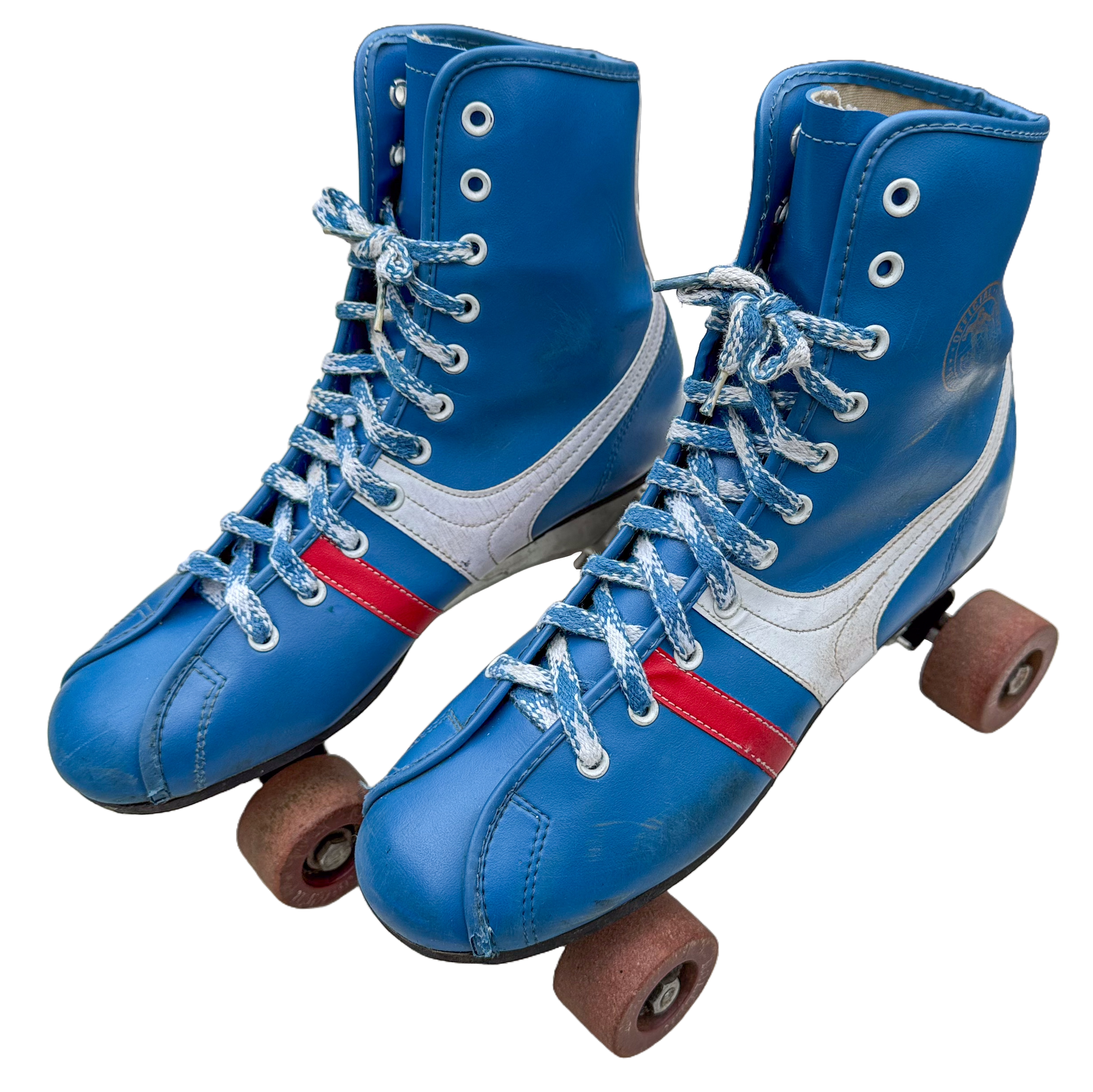
Roller Derby skates from the 1970s

Initially, the company had a single plant in Litchfield, Illinois. The company opened an additional assembly plant in California in 1953, followed by offices, warehouses, and a distribution center in Atglen, Pennsylvania in 1971. The company eventually moved manufacturing operations overseas, first to Taiwan, then to mainland China. Its U.S. manufacturing facilities were converted to offices, warehouses and distribution centers. The company is still based in Litchfield, Illinois.

== See also ==
- Roller Derby Skateboard
- Competitors
  - K2 Skates
  - Riedell Skates
  - Rollerblade
  - Salomon Group (no longer in skate business)
