= Darlene Anderson =

American roller derby skater

Personal information
- Nationality: American
- Born: 1939 (age 86–87)
- Height: 5 ft 10 in (1.78 m)

Sport
- Sport: Roller derby
- Team: Brooklyn Red Devils; Arizona Raiders; San Francisco Clippers; Detroit Devils; Hawaiian All-Stars; San Francisco Bay Bombers; New York Chiefs; Los Angeles Braves
- Turned pro: 1957

Darlene Anderson (born March 19, 1939) is an American roller derby skater. Anderson became the first African American woman to play professional roller derby when she was chosen as the first pick for the Brooklyn Red Devils in 1957.

== Life and skating career ==
Anderson was born and raised in Pasadena, California. She had four siblings, three of which were older brothers. Anderson was an excellent athlete in school, comfortable in any athletic endeavor. After her mother forbid her from playing baseball because it was too rough, Anderson convinced her parents to let her try skating (letting her mother think she was ice skating, a sport more suitable for young ladies).

She graduated from John Muir High School in 1957.

Anderson trained for eighteen months at the Western Skating Institute in Los Angeles. Her strong performance in time trials at the Olympic Auditorium led to becoming the first pick of the Brooklyn Red Devils. In September 1957, Anderson joined the roller derby owned by Jerry Seltzer, becoming the first Black woman to play the sport. She debuted the same night as George Copeland, the second Black man to skate in the derby and the first to become a popular star. Anderson described her treatment by her fellow skaters:

Myself being black, I don't think ever mattered to anyone as I was respected, treated by all skaters on an equal level, and I don't ever remember once that black was an issue. In fact, I think if you ask anyone of our age group, or of our skating group, we saw no color. No, black wasn't an issue or, if it was, the person was kind enough to respect me and keep it to themselves. We were family. We were not color. I truly believe this.

At age nineteen, she was awarded Rookie of the Year 1958. Anderson traveled across the U.S. with her team, but she would be sent home to California when the teams performed in the segregated South. Looking back, Anderson reflected: "They knew I wouldn't be able to eat with them or live with them, and they didn't want me to go through that. I was the only Black person, and they were so nice and trying to make me at home. Even though it didn't register that they were trying to look out for me, they were trying to keep me safe."

Anderson was mentored by Gerry Murray, a star skater on the New York Chiefs team. In 1959, her coach Buddy Atkinson Sr. said, "She's terrific. She has speed, stamina, the competitive spirit and a wealth of natural ability." In her first year, she earned $75 a week. In addition to her first team, the Brooklyn Red Devils, Anderson played on many teams, including the San Francisco Bay Bombers, New York Chiefs, Los Angeles Braves, Hawaiian All-Stars, Arizona Raiders, San Francisco Clippers, and Detroit Devils.

She retired from skating in the 1970s, when she was in her early thirties. After retirement, she worked as a parimutuel clerk, becoming the first black woman to be a parimutuel clerk with the Southern California Racing Association. She also worked for a consulting firm, training people to get positions in show business.

In 2009 Anderson was inducted into the Roller Derby Hall of Fame.
