= Old School Derby Association =

The Old School Derby Association (OSDA) was an association of roller derby leagues in the United States.

The OSDA was founded by Kenneth Sikes in 2007, with nine member leagues. It has the stated ambition of bringing together innovations in flat-track derby with the traditions of the banked-track sport. It uses a rulebook developed by the Penn Jersey She Devils, which can be used for men's, women's, mixed or alternating groups of skaters, and for play on flat- or banked-tracks.

The OSDA was initially described as one of the two main organisations for derby leagues, along with the Women's Flat Track Derby Association (WFTDA). The New York Times described it as being known for "allowing tougher, more punishing hits" than the WFTDA. As of 2013, the OSDA is defunct.

== Leagues ==
In September 2011, the OSDA listed six member leagues:

- Antihero Derby Alliance, Chantilly, Virginia
- Dead Girl Derby KC, Missouri
- Man's Ruin Roller Derby, Orange County, New York
- One World Roller Derby, Seattle, Washington
- Orlando Psycho City Derby, Orlando, Florida
- Penn Jersey Roller Derby, Philadelphia, Pennsylvania
