= Gerry Murray =

American roller derby skater (1920–2019)

Personal information
- Nationality: American
- Born: September 30, 1920
- Died: August 9, 2019 (aged 98)

Sport
- Sport: Roller derby
- Team: New York Chiefs; Chicago Westerners; San Diego Clippers; San Francisco Bay Bombers; Los Angeles Thunderbirds; Long Beach Falcons; Houston Westerners; New York Braves; Manhattan Chiefs; Midwest Pioneers
- Turned pro: 1938

Gerry Murray (September 30, 1920 – August 9, 2019) was an American roller derby skater. She played for most of her career with the New York Chiefs, becoming a popular derby star known for her glamour as well as her on-track rivalry with Midge "Toughie" Brasuhn. Murray was one of the first American sportswomen to sign an endorsement deal and was inducted to the Roller Derby Hall of Fame in 1956.

== Early life ==
Geraldine Murray was born in Des Moines, Iowa, on September 30, 1920. Her parents were Raymond and Leila (Zika) Murray, but she was raised primarily by her grandmother, Grace Jones, after her parents' divorce when she was six years old. Murray played softball as a young child and was recruited for the Russell Sporting Goods team, which won a state championship.

She graduated from North High School in 1938.

== Skating career ==
In 1938, Murray tried out for the newly formed Roller Derby and was selected as a trainee, joining a team in Texas.

Along with stars like Billy Bogash and Midge "Toughie" Brasuhn, Murray became a well-known personality. Billy Bogash said of Murray, "That Gerry is the best skater in the business". Murray was one of the first American women to sign endorsement deals, with branded hair ties and bobby pins sold at department stores. She was one of the first people to become a part of the Roller Derby Hall of Fame; she was inducted in 1956.

Murray became Chicago's team captain in 1947. Murray was the women's captain of the New York Chiefs for many years, skating with the jersey number 22. She also ran the Chiefs' training school. Murray was famed for her scuffles with other skaters, especially "Toughie" Brasuhn, although the two were friends off the track. The rivalry between Murray and Brasuhn was highly promoted in the 1940s and 1950s, and they were both well-compensated as stars. A 2014 children's picture book, "Roller Derby Rivals" by Sue Macy, tells the story of the close relationship of Murray and Brasuhn.

She retired from skating in 1960, going on to own two bars and a cattle and horse ranch in California. She returned to the track in 1975, however, skating with her son and daughter-in-law on the New York Braves of the United Banked Track Skating Association. After that league collapsed, she joined the reconstituted New York Chiefs in the International Roller Skating League in 1977.

Murray died in Des Moines on August 9, 2019, at the age of 98.

== Personal life ==
Murray married two fellow roller derby skaters. The first was Paul Milane; in 1941 they had a son, Mike. After their divorce, Murray married her coach and teammate Gene Gammon, who adopted Mike. Mike Gammon grew up on the roller derby circuit and followed in his parents footsteps to become a derby star in his own right.
