= Penn Jersey Roller Derby =

Roller derby league

- Metro area: Philadelphia, PA
- Country: United States
- Founded: 2005
- Teams: She Devils (Women's travel team); B-Devils (Women's B team); Hooligans (Men's A team); Shenanigans (Men's B team)
- Track type(s): Banked, Flat
- Venue: The Warehouse at 18th And Indiana
- Affiliations: RDCL; MRDA; WFTDA; OSDA
- Website: pennjerseyrollerderby.com

Penn Jersey Roller Derby (PJRD) is a roller derby league based in Philadelphia, Pennsylvania. Founded in 2005 by Ken Sikes and Greg Spencer as the "Penn Jersey She Devils", the league is home to women and men playing both flat and banked track roller derby.

As long time fans of traditional banked track roller derby, Ken Sikes and Greg Spencer recruited former professional derby skaters Judy Sowinski and Arnold "Skip" Schoen to train the newly formed team. The league developed its own rule-set based on former professional banked track roller derby play. This rule-set was adopted by the Old School Derby Association, founded by Sikes, of which Penn Jersey was a founding member. PJRD briefly joined the Modern Athletic Derby Endeavor to play banked and flat track derby, before joining rules sets specific to banked track and flat track roller derby.

In 2010, the league re-branded to be inclusive of the Hooligans men's team, and the league became known as "Penn Jersey Roller Derby". That same year, PJRD purchased a banked track, and relocated to their current warehouse space. This move allowed the league to host both flat and banked track games in Philadelphia.

Currently, Penn Jersey Roller Derby is a co-ed, "bi-traxual" league, with affiliations with the RDCL, WFTDA, and MRDA roller derby organizations. The league boasts the She Devils women's A and B travel team, as well as the Hooligans men's A and B travel team.

== Notable Events ==
July, 2014, the Hooligans men's team joins the Men's Roller Derby Association.

June, 2015, the She Devils women's team joins the Roller Derby Coalition of Leagues banked track organization.

June, 2016, PJRD hosts the 9th annual Battle on the Bank national banked track tournament.

July, 2016, the She Devils are accepted into the WFTDA Apprentice program.

July, 2017 the She Devils complete WFTDA Apprentice program and achieve full member status.
