= Robert Kaylor =

American director and screenwriter

Robert Kaylor (born August 1, 1934) is an American director and screenwriter.

Kaylor was married to filmmaker, producer and writer Phoebe Fischer in New York in 1965. They divorced in 1988.

== Filmography ==
Director

- 1970 : Max-Out (documentary)
- 1971 : Derby (documentary)
- 1980 : Carny
- 1990 : Nobody's Perfect
