= Sammy Skobel =

American roller derby skater

Personal information
- Nationality: American
- Born: April 26, 1926
- Died: June 9, 2018 (aged 92)

Sport
- Sport: Roller derby
- Team: Brooklyn Red Devils; New York Chiefs; Chicago Westerners; IRDL Midwest Pioneers
- Turned pro: 1946

Samuel "Sammy" Skobel (April 26, 1926 – June 9, 2018) was an American roller derby skater. Legally blind, he was a derby star who was voted most valuable player in the league three times and inducted to the Roller Derby Hall of Fame in 1953. Skobel also held the world record for the fastest mile skated on a banked track. After his retirement from skating, Skobel co-founded the American Blind Skiing Foundation.

== Early life ==
Samuel Skobel was born April 26, 1926, the son of Russian immigrants. He was born on Maxwell Street in Chicago, where his parents owned a grocery, meat market, and catering business.

An infection with scarlet fever at age four left him legally blind, with less than ten percent of his vision remaining. At five years old, he build a shoeshine box out of wooden crates from his family's store on Maxwell Street, which he used to shine the shoes of police officers for 2 cents.

He attended Crane Technical High School. Skobel was active in several sports as a teenager, including pole vaulting, high jumping, and baseball. A track star in high school, he ran a 4:22 mile and was offered full scholarships to three universities, but those offers were rescinded when the schools learned he was legally blind.

He had a hard time finding and maintaining a job after graduating from high school; he was denied a job in an electronics factory and got fired from a job repairing innertubes after just a few hours.

== Skating career ==
In 1945, Skobel tried out for the roller derby at the Chicago Coliseum, but was rejected after the general manager of the Roller Derby watched him struggle to fill out the application with a magnifying glass. Instead, Skobel joined the roller derby working as a locker attendant, earning 50 cents per day. He worked in the center of the banked-track ring, memorizing the styles and outlines of the skaters. When he heard that the derby was holding tryouts in Chattanooga in January 1946, he traveled there by bus and was able to keep his low vision a secret during trials. He signed with the Brooklyn Red Devils in 1946, keeping his disability a secret for the first five years he played. Skobel would listen for the sound of an opponent's skates coming up behind him, and if a skater was close he could see whether they were wearing stripes or certain colors.

In 1949, Skobel became the youngest team captain in the history of the sport. Skobel was traded to the Chicago Westerners in 1953, where he skated for twelve seasons. He skated for the IRDL Midwest Pioneers from 1964 to 1966. He had several nicknames throughout his career, including "Slammin'" Sammy Skobel and "Gunner" Skobel.

Skobel was voted the league's Most Valuable Player of the year three times during his skating career, and was on eighteen all-star teams. He was one of the first seven people added to the original Roller Derby Hall of Fame when he was inducted in 1953. In 1958 Skobel set a world record fastest mile on a banked track, skating the mile in 2 minutes and 36 seconds.

By the end of his career, he was paid $80,000 each season. He skated his last game in May 1966, but would later serve as a consulting coach for the San Francisco Bay Bombers.

== Skiing ==
Skobel accompanied his son Steve on a ski trip to Aspen, where he learned about the Blind Outdoor Leadership Development program offering instruction in Alpine and cross-country skiing. He brought the idea to his local Lions Club, who helped him get a skiing instruction program started for blind children and adults. In 1971 Skobel founded the American Blind Skiing Foundation, along with his wife and three other Mount Prospect residents. The organization gives blind and visually impaired skiers an opportunity to ski, providing safety training and ski guides.

== Personal life and later life ==
During his time in New York, Skobel met many celebrities and dated Debbie Reynolds before she was well-known. Skobel married his wife Acrivie ("Vee") in 1952; they had two sons together, Sam Jr. and Stephen.

After retiring from the roller derby, he opened Sammy Skobel's Hot Dogs Plus in downtown Mount Prospect, Illinois. He ran the restaurant from 1965 to 1989, when he sold it to a former employee, James Kobler Jr. He also traveled as a motivational speaker, giving talks on "Creating a Positive Attitude for Life." In 1982, Skobel collaborated with freelance writer Joyce Buck McDonald to write his autobiography, titled Semka. The jacket described the book as the "story of a determined young blind man from his boyhood in Chicago's Maxwell Street to a professional athletic career, setting a world speed skating record."

Skobel was diagnosed with Alzheimer's disease in his late 80s. He died at age 92 in his home in Mount Prospect on June 9, 2018.
