= Busy Little Bears =

1939 film

- Directed by: John A. Haeseler
- Written by: Justin Herman
- Produced by: Justin Herman
- Starring: Frank Crumit
- Distributed by: Paramount Pictures
- Release date: April 20, 1939
- Running time: 10 minutes
- Country: United States
- Language: English

Busy Little Bears is a 1939 American short family film directed by John A. Haeseler. It won an Oscar at the 12th Academy Awards in 1940 for Best Short Subject (One-Reel). The film was preserved by the Academy Film Archive, in conjunction with the UCLA Film and Television Archive, in 2013.

== Cast ==
- Frank Crumit as Narrator (voice)
