= Justin Herman =

American screenwriter (1907–1983)

- Born: April 29, 1907; Philadelphia, Pennsylvania
- Died: December 3, 1983 (aged 76); New Hope, Pennsylvania
- Occupations: Screenwriter, film producer, film director
- Years active: 1934–1955

Justin Herman (April 29, 1907 – December 3, 1983) was an American screenwriter, film producer and director. He wrote for 42 films between 1934 and 1952. He was nominated for an Academy Award in 1950 for Roller Derby Girl and again in 1956 for Three Kisses. Both nominations were in the category Best Short Subject. He was born in Philadelphia, Pennsylvania and died in New Hope, Pennsylvania.

== Selected filmography ==
- Busy Little Bears (1939)
- Beauty and the Beach (1941)
- Who's Who in Animal Land (1944)
- Babies, They're Wonderful! - short (1947)
