= Roller Derby Girl =

- Directed by: Justin Herman
- Written by: Justin Herman
- Produced by: Justin Herman
- Starring: Jean Porter; Midge "Toughie" Brasuhn
- Cinematography: Boris Kaufman
- Edited by: Robert Blauvelt
- Music by: Winston Sharples
- Distributed by: Paramount Pictures
- Release date: July 10, 1949
- Running time: 10 minutes
- Country: United States
- Language: English

Roller Derby Girl is a 1949 American short film directed and written by Justin Herman.

== Cast ==
- Jean Porter
- Midge "Toughie" Brasuhn

== Reception ==
Boxoffice wrote: "Good. For many audiences the scenes of this rough sport will be an eyeopener. Girls as well as men skate for a living around an oval rink, and nearly everything goes. Fists as well as elbows are used, with many consequent hard spills on the board track or into the railing. After seeing the film, patrons will wonder if there is any weaker sex."

== Awards ==
Justin Herman was nominated for an Academy Award for "Best Short Subject, One-reel".
