= Jayant Rajora =

Indian Speed Skater

Personal information
- Nationality: Indian
- Citizenship: India
- Born: 6 November 1994 (age 31) Delhi, India
- Education: Post Graduate at University of Delhi
- Occupation: Coach
- Years active: 2006 - present
- Employer: Roller Skating Federation of India
- Height: 169.5 cm (5 ft 7 in)

Sport
- Country: India
- Sport: Speed Skating

Achievements and titles
- World finals: World Roller Games 2017

Jayant Rajora is an Indian Inline Speed Skater who represented India in World Roller Games Championship 2017, held at Nanjing, China.

== Early life and education ==
He has completed Graduation and Post Graduation from Delhi University in sports science.

== Competitions ==
Representing India
Year	Competition	Venue	Position	Event	Notes
2009	CBSE National Championship				
2011	CBSE National Championship	Jagran Public School, Noida	1st	500 mtr	
2011	School National Championship	Delhi	3rd	3,000 mtr	
2012	School National Championship	Delhi	2nd	3,000 mtr	
2012	Senior National Championship	Virar, Mumbai	3rd	3,000 mtr	
2016	Senior National Championship	Bangalore	3rd	20,000 mtr, Road Elimination	
2017	World Roller Game	China			

== Event specialty & performance ==
- Track Elimination Race (15000 meters)
- Track Points Race (10000 meters)
- Road Elimination Race (20000 meters)
- Road Points Race (10000 meters)

== Medical history ==
1. Neuro-Surgery due to injury during training session, 2010
2. Tibial wound, 2018

== See also ==
- Inline Skating
- Roller Skating Federation of India
