= Brown Paper Tickets =

Ticket management company

- Industry: event hosting
- Headquarters: Seattle, United States
- Products: Ticket management
- Website: brownpapertickets.com

Brown Paper Tickets is a Seattle-based business which provides ticket management support for any organizer hosting any sort of ticketed event. On October 25, 2022, Events.com, Inc., announced its plans to acquire Brown Paper Tickets.

== Overview ==
Brown Paper Tickets attempts to provide ways for event organizers to provide tickets with lower costs than larger ticket companies. The organization emphasizes simplicity in its ticketing sales process. The company's culture includes providing support to encourage employees to volunteer for charitable causes for 40 hours yearly.

== Complaints ==
In 2020 the company failed to return money for events canceled in the wake of the COVID-19 pandemic, as well as payments on tickets for events held before COVID-19-related shutdowns, resulting in a wave of lawsuits and complaints filed with the Better Business Bureau.
