= Ghizlane Samir =

French inline speed skater (born 1976)

Ghizlane "Rizlan" Samir Brown (born 3 August 1976) is a French inline speed skater.

She was born in Casablanca, Morocco, and moved to Paris, France, at the age of 16, where she started skating. She initially practiced figure skating, roller dance and slalom, before trying inline speed skating in 2000.

Ghizlane soon showed her very powerful style in French Inline Cup (FIC) competitions, which she won twice, in 2003 and 2005. She began her international career in 2003, and has since then regularly participated in World Inline Cup, French Inline Cup and Swiss Inline Cup (SIC) competitions. As of 2007, she raced for the SsangYong Jesa Bont international team.

== Career highlights ==
=== 2007 (temporary results) ===
- 8th at World Inline Cup (WIC) overall ranking,
- Gold at French national championships 2006 – 3000 m against the clock;
- 1st at French Inline Cup (FIC) 2005 overall ranking;
- 4th at Swiss Inline Cup (SIC) overall ranking,
- top 20 at World championship in Cali Colombia - road track elimination race,

- Bronze at French national championships 2007 – 42 km marathon.
- 2nd at Lille French Inline Cup;
- 4th at Basel against-the-clock (World Inline Cup);
- 6th at Suzhou World Inline Cup;
- 7th at Sursee World Inline Cup.

=== 2006 ===
- Silver at French national championships 2006 – 42 km marathon.
- 8th at World Inline Cup (WIC) overall;
- 4th at Swiss Inline Cup (SIC) overall;
- 2nd at French Inline Cup (FIC) overall;
- 1st at Lille French Inline Cup;
- 2nd at Zugersee World Inline Cup;
- 3rd at Goelo French Inline Cup;
- 4th at Zurich World Inline Cup;
- 4th at Basel World Inline Cup;
- 4th at Glarus World Inline Cup;
- 4th at Bern Swiss Inline Cup;
- 5th at Einsiedeln Swiss Inline Cup;
- 5th at Nîmes French Inline Cup;
- 6th at Munich World Inline Cup;
- 7th at Seoul World Inline Cup;
- 9th at Biel World Inline Cup.

=== 2005 ===
- Gold at French national championships 2006 – 3000 m against the clock;
- Bronze at French national championships 2006 – 42 km marathon;
- 1st at French Inline Cup (FIC) 2005 overall ranking;
- 1st at Trans'Roller French Inline Cup;
- 2nd at Vendée Roller Marathon French Inline Cup;
- 3rd at Lille Roller Marathon French Inline Cup;
- 3rd at Goelo French Inline Cup;
- 3rd at One Eleven (111 km - Saint-Gallen, Switzerland);
- 8th at Biel and Bern roller marathons (Swiss Inline Cup);
- 8th at Val d'Oise roller marathon (World Inline Cup);
- 9th at Dijon Grand Prix (World Inline Cup);
- 9th at Zurich Grand Prix (World Inline Cup);
- 11th at Nice Grand Prix (World Inline Cup);
- 10th at Engadin Grand Prix (World Inline Cup);
- 8th at Swiss Inline Cup overall ranking;
- 13th at World Inline Cup overall ranking.

=== 2004 ===
- Silver at French national championships 2004 – 42 km marathon;
- Bronze at French national championships 2004 – 3000 m against the clock;
- 1st at Trans'Roller French Inline Cup;
- 1st at A-Klasse Inline-Cup half-marathon (Germany);
- 1st at Tunisia half-marathon;
- 4th at French Inline Cup (FIC) 2004 overall ranking;
- 11th Zurich Grand Prix (World Inline Cup);
- 14th at Swiss Inline Cup (SIC) 2004 overall ranking;
- 17th at World Inline Cup (WIC) 2004 overall ranking.

=== 2003 ===
- 1st at French Inline Cup (FIC) 2003 overall ranking;
- 2nd at One Eleven (111 km - Saint-Gallen, Switzerland);
- 7th at Rennes Grand Prix (World Inline Cup);
- 9th at Zurich Grand Prix (World Inline Cup);
- 9th at Swiss Inline Cup (SIC) 2003 overall ranking;
- 14th at World Inline Cup (WIC) 2003 overall ranking.
