= Texas Roller Derby =

Roller derby league

Texas Roller Derby (TXRD)
- Metro area: Austin, Texas
- Country: United States
- Founded: 2001
- Teams: Cherry Bombs; Hellcats; Hired Gun$ Holy Rollers; Putas Del Fuego; Rhinestones
- Current champions: Cherrybombs (5th title)
- Track type: Banked
- Website: www.txrd.com

Texas Roller Derby (TXRD), formerly known as Texas Lonestar Rollergirls, is Austin, Texas' only banked-track roller derby league. Founded in Austin in 2001, TXRD is often credited with the revival of the modern roller derby movement. TXRD is skater-owned and operated and open to all women, transgender, intersex, and gender-expansive athletes.

In 2006, the skaters of TXRD were featured in a 13-episode television series on A&E titled Rollergirls, which contributed to the renewed international popularity of women's roller derby.

Notably, TXRD is the only banked-track league to allow both fighting and a penalty wheel. Both are real and unscripted.

== Teams ==
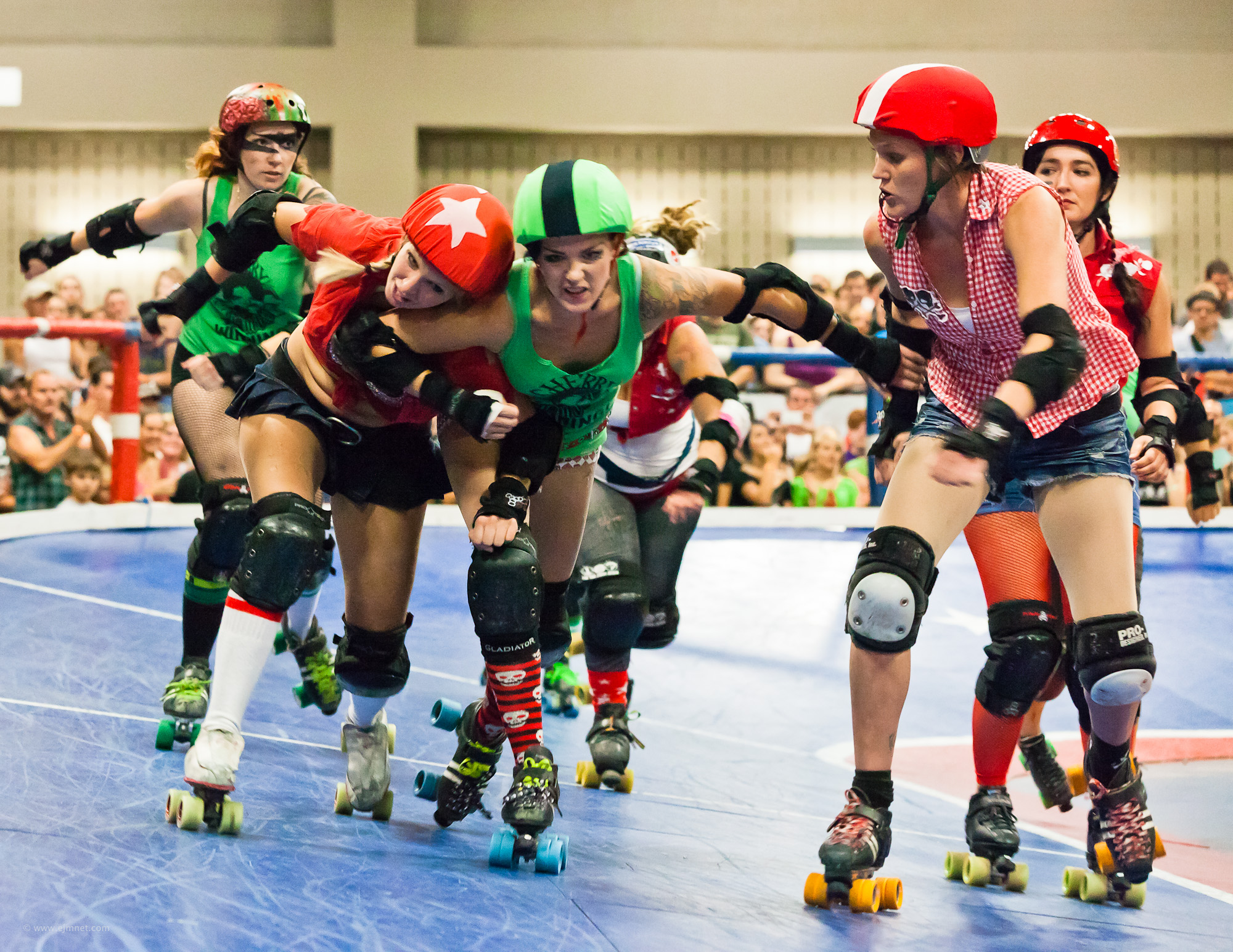
Cherry Bombs (Green) vs Rhinestone Cowgirls (Red) on August 27, 2011, in Austin, Texas

TXRD features six home teams plus a traveling team:

- Hellcats
- Putas Del Fuego
- Holy Rollers
- Rhinestones
- Cherry Bombs
- Hired Gun$
- All-Scar Army (Travel Team)

=== 2025 Season Rosters ===
Hellcats	Putas Del Fuego	Holy Rollers	Rhinestones	Cherry Bombs	Hired Gun$
Cyd Vicious	Bad Habbitch	BeetleJukes	Beaux Dacious	Aggrobat	Ryder Die
Gayle Force Winz	Bruise Cruise	Blunt Force Trauma	Cannabish	Anya Marx	Jose Queervo
Goldie Rush	Buffy Basher	Busty MC	Colonel Slamders	Boogie Heights	Landshark
Hannibal Wrecker	GAUDSPEED	Crash Bandicunt	Harli Grim	Bully Jean	Blue Valentine
Minnie Fridge	Hellooo Nurse	Daisy Confused	Mad Maxican	Dani Darko	Pop Roxy
Jersey Dykes	Manila Wafer	Femme O'Naide	Nicola Virus	Ethyl Murder	The Breathless Banshee
Nina Guillotina	Miller Fite	Fruity Rebel	Rattleskate	Faye Tality	Wallace & Vomit
Taylor Drift	Mustang Smashley	Hartlyn	Rum Punch	Margo Rita	Critical Hit
Vanna FOok	Netflix and Kill	Hex Appeal	Smackalope	Milla Juke-a-Bitch	Anna Leash
Whorechata	Rhea Sunshine	Low Blow	Toxic Thot Syndrome	Ninja Please	Knuckle Sammy
	Satalite	Rails from the Crypt	Twinkerbell	The Star	Kim Reaper
	Stevie Kicks	Stranger Thing		Zara Problem	Saleen Slipstream
		Trauma Queen			Bunny Rabid

== Calvello Cup ==
Roller derby performer Anne Calvello, the "Demon of the Derby", was an inspiration to the founding members of TXRD. They maintained a close correspondence with her in the early years of the league, finally meeting her in person in 2005 during the filming of the A&E show Rollergirls. The Championship Cup has been named in her honor.

=== List of finals ===
List of Calvello Cup finals
Season	Winners	Score	Runners-up
2002	Hellcats	Unknown	Unknown
2003	Rhinestone Cowgirls	Unknown	Unknown
2004	Holy Rollers	Unknown	Unknown
2005	Rhinestone Cowgirls	39-36	Holy Rollers
2006	Putas Del Fuego	59-47	Rhinestone Cowgirls
2007	Holy Rollers	72-43	Rhinestone Cowgirls
2008	Holy Rollers	18-14	Hellcats
2009	Hellcats	44-35	Cherry Bombs
2010	Cherry Bombs	Unknown	Hellcats
2011	Rhinestone Cowgirls	Unknown	Cherry Bombs
2012	Rhinestone Cowgirls	50-33	Holy Rollers
2013	Cherry Bombs	51-47	Rhinestone Cowgirls
2014	Putas Del Fuego	37-35	Rhinestone Cowgirls
2015	Putas Del Fuego	63-41	Cherry Bombs
2016	Cherry Bombs	63-39	Hellcats
2017	Cherry Bombs	91-86	Putas Del Fuego
2018	Putas Del Fuego	Unknown	Rhinestone Cowgirls
2019	Holy Rollers	112-75	Rhinestone Cowgirls
2020			
2021			
2022			
2023	Rhinestones		Cherry Bombs
2024	Rhinestones	79-73	Cherry Bombs
2025	Cherry Bombs	109-84	Rhinestones

=== Performances by team ===
Performances in the Calvello Cup by Team
Team	Titles	Runners-up	Seasons won	Seasons runner-up
Rhinestone Cowgirls	6	7	2003, 2005, 2011, 2012, 2023, 2024	2006, 2007, 2013, 2014, 2018, 2019, 2025
Cherry Bombs	5	5	2010, 2013, 2016, 2017, 2025	2009, 2011, 2015, 2023, 2024
Holy Rollers	4	2	2004, 2007, 2008, 2019	2005, 2012
Putas Del Fuego	4	1	2006, 2014, 2015, 2018	2017
Hellcats	2	3	2002, 2009	2008, 2010, 2016

== Penalty Wheel and Spank Alley ==
Rather than having skaters accumulate minor penalties throughout the game, as in other rule sets, skaters who have earned minor penalties are assigned a penalty through a spin of the penalty wheel. The penalties themselves have evolved throughout the years from entertainment-only penalties to a mix of entertainment and point-loss penalties to solely point-loss penalties. Current penalties include:

- Long Jump
- Pillow Fight
- Arm Wrestling
- Two Lap Duel
- Tug of War
- Push Cart
- Relay Race
- Judge's Choice*

*The Judge's Choice penalty is chosen by 11 fans seated in Spank Alley. Spank Alley seats are reserved for the winner of raffle tickets sold to fans throughout the game.

As part of TXRD's larger community outreach and philanthropy program, proceeds from the sale of Spank Alley tickets are donated to a trust for the son of the original Penalty mistress, Amber Diva, who died in 2003.

== In popular culture ==
Skaters and fans from TXRD were featured in the 2002 video for Nashville Pussy's "Say Something Nasty".

In 2006, A&E produced the 13-episode series Rollergirls, featuring the personalities and games of the 2005 season. The show focused primarily on the lives of Cha Cha and Venis Envy of the Putas Del Fuego; Punky Bruiser, Miss Conduct, and Sister Mary Jane of the Holy Rollers; Lunatic and Clownsnack of the Hellcats; and Lux of the Rhinestone Cowgirls. Many other skaters were highlighted.

Also in 2006, TXRD skaters Lux and Venis Envy were featured in the music video for The Flaming Lips single The W.A.N.D. on the album At War with the Mystics.

Hell on Wheels, a documentary about the creation of the all-female roller derby league in Austin, Texas, in 2001 that sparked the modern derby revival premiered in March 2007 at the South by Southwest Film Festival. It focuses on the revival of the game via the original organization from which both TXRD Lonestar Rollergirls (banked-track) and Texas Rollergirls (WFTDA flat track) arose.

Released in October 2009, the film Whip It! based on a book by former LA Derby Dolls skater Shauna Cross featured both the league (in name) and the Holy Rollers (in name). Two TXRD skaters, Sacralicious of the Cherry Bombs and Rocky Casbah of the Cherry Bombs, provided stunt work and cameos along with other skaters from across the country.

Beginning February 2011, TXRD Lonestar Rollergirls bouts will be broadcast on central Texas television channel KCWX.

The TXRD Lonestar Rollergirls were featured in the 2012 Australian documentary film This Is Roller Derby.

Nokia Lumia's 920 ad campaign video competition in spring 2013 featured skaters from the Hellcats in a cameraphone comparison video.

The 2013 BBC program How to Build a Planet, hosted by Richard Hammond, featured TXRD Rollergirls in Episode 2, "Engineering a Universe". Skaters demonstrated principles of astrophysics and their effect on heavenly bodies in the creation of a solar system.

TXRD bouts are no longer aired on KCWX, but are streamed via their TXRD Facebook page, live on bout days.

In 2020, TXRD was featured on the Netflix series Home Game, a docuseries profiling unique and dangerous sports from around the world.
