= Roller Derby Skateboard =

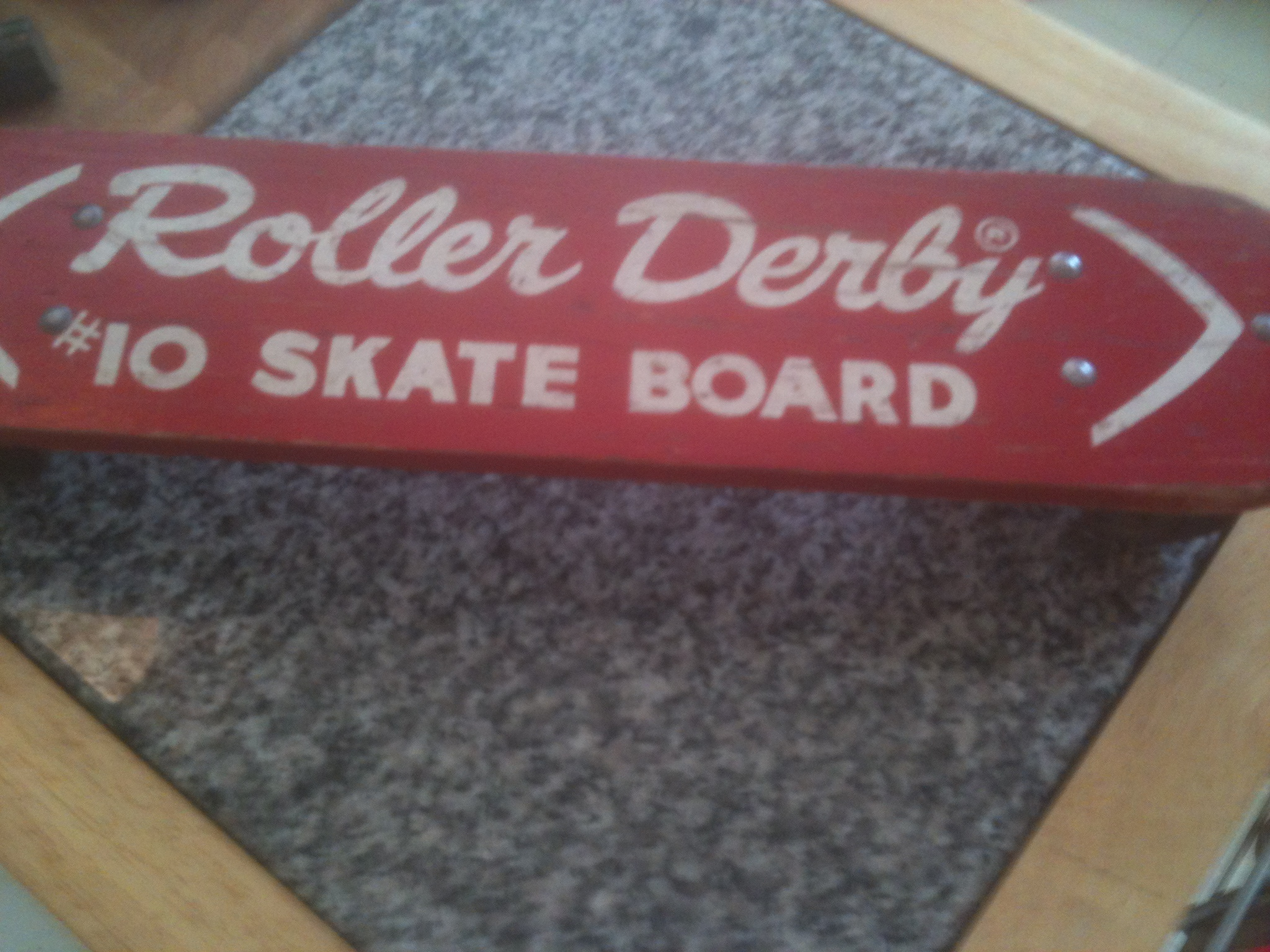

The Roller Derby Skateboard was the first mass-produced skateboard, sold by the Roller Derby Skate Company as a "Skate Board" (without the "#10"). Roller Derby made this skateboard in their La Mirada, CA factory, and it was available nationwide at Roller Derby arenas in 1959, and then in Thrifty Drugstores and Sears, Roebuck and Co. as the "Roller Derby Skate Board" in 1960. It was very similar to the first commercially available skateboard; the red, flat, straight-sided, steel-wheeled "Bun Board" which had been made and sold in Hermosa Beach by Alf Jensen since 1957. In 1964 Roller Derby added 3 surfboard-shaped rubber-wheeled models similar to Makaha skateboards produced in 1963. These three skateboards were produced in their Litchfield, Illinois plant.

Only after 1963, when they were making other models, was it necessary to assign the "#10" model number to the little red skateboard.

The Roller Derby Skateboard company was owned and operated by Barry Jacobs.
