= Ronnie Robinson (roller derby) =

American roller derby skater

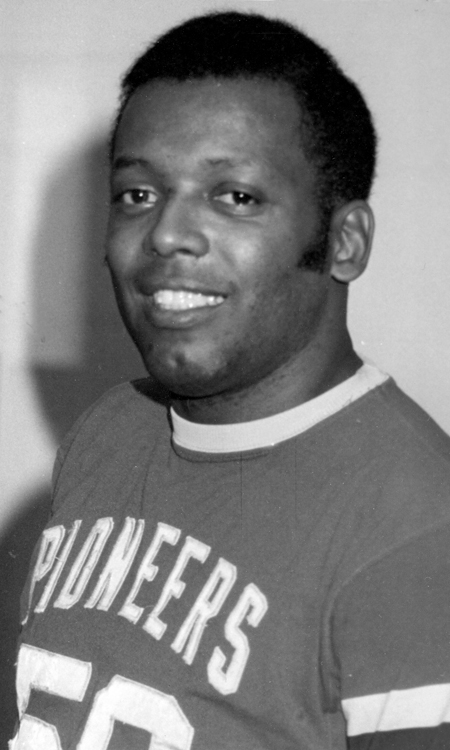
- Robinson in 1973

Personal information
- Nationality: American
- Born: September 25, 1938
- Died: April 14, 2001 (aged 62)
- Height: 5 ft 10 in (1.78 m)
- Weight: 170 lb (77 kg)

Sport
- Sport: Roller derby
- Team: New York Chiefs; Chicago Westerners; Brooklyn Red Devils; Northeast Braves; San Diego Clippers; Mexico City Cardenales; New England Braves; Chicago Pioneers; Los Angeles Thunderbirds
- Turned pro: 1958
- Retired: 1974
- Now coaching: 1969–1972, 1975, 1991–1992

Ronnie Smith Robinson (25 September 1938 – April 2001) was an American roller derby skater and coach.

The son of boxer Sugar Ray Robinson, Robinson grew up distant from his father, who divorced his mother shortly before his birth. Sugar Ray advised Ronnie not to follow him into the world of boxing. After watching roller derby on television, he decided to join the sport, and enrolled in its training school in March 1958, initially under the pseudonym "Ronald Smith." He turned professional after five months, being placed on the New York Chiefs team.

Robinson was the fourth African American to play roller derby professionally, after Maurice Plummer, George Copeland, and Darlene Anderson. He was a member of the All-Star team for more than ten consecutive years, and was twice named the Most Valuable Player. On one occasion, Robinson fractured his arm in several places, and was unsure whether he would ever be able to use it again. He also lost his front teeth in a fight with Bob Woodberry, and suffered several concussions.

In 2004 Robinson was inducted to the Roller Derby Hall of Fame.

Sporting positions
Preceded by Ken Monte	International Roller Derby League Male MVP; 1968	Succeeded by Tony Roman
