= Rollergirls =

- Skater Cha Cha
- Created by: Gary and Julie Auerbach
- Starring: Lux, Sister Mary Jane, Punky Bruiser, Cha Cha, Miss Conduct, Venis Envy
- Country of origin: United States
- No. of episodes: 13

Production
- Running time: 60 minutes

Original release
- Network: A&E Network
- Release: January 2 – March 27, 2006

Rollergirls is a 2006 A&E Network reality show examining the personalities, antics and motivations of the women involved with the Austin, Texas, Lonestar Rollergirls roller derby league. According to their website, the league was founded in 2001 and is run as a "skater-owned and operated" company. Variety reported on March 13, 2006 that A&E was canceling the show due to low ratings.

The five league teams, of about ten members each, are the Cherry Bombs, Hellcats, Holy Rollers, Putas Del Fuego and Rhinestone Cowgirls. Episodes were initially broadcast on Monday nights beginning on January 2, 2006, with repeated showings throughout the week. Rollergirls was produced by Gary and Julie Auerbach, the creators of MTV's Laguna Beach: The Real Orange County.

== Episodes ==
"The Rookie"—January 2, 2006; "No Pain, No Jane"—January 9, 2006; "Snack is Back"—January 16, 2006; "The Warriors"—January 23, 2006; "The C Word"—January 30, 2006; "Love Boat"—February 6, 2006; "Punky Needs a Life"—February 13, 2006	"Orange"—February 20, 2006; "Searching for Ann Calvello"—February 27, 2006; "Big Time"—March 6, 2006; "Undefeated"—March 13, 2006; "Rollerball"—March 20, 2006; "Skating Away"—March 27, 2006

== See also ==
- Roller derby
- Aggressive inline skating
