= Judy Sowinski =

Roller derby skater and coach

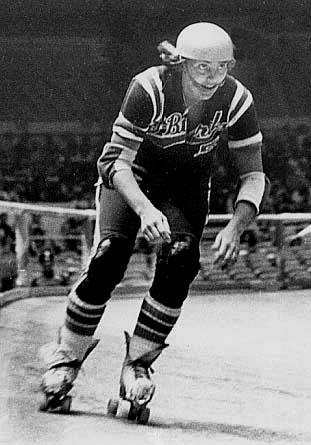
- Judy Sowinski on the jam, Madison Square Garden, 1974

Personal information
- Nickname: Polish Ace
- Nationality: American
- Born: July 7, 1940
- Died: July 27, 2011 (aged 71)

Sport
- Sport: Roller derby
- Team: San Francisco Bombers; Los Angeles Thunderbirds; New York Bombers; Philadelphia Warriors
- Turned pro: 1959
- Retired: March 1992 - Hershey Arena
- Now coaching: 2003–2011

Judy Sowinski (7 July 1940 – 27 July 2011) was a roller derby skater and coach.

Sowinski was born in Chicago, and became interested in roller derby after watching a game at the Chicago Coliseum in 1957. She tried out and was soon picked up as a professional, skating for the San Francisco Bombers. She cultivated an obnoxious persona, but preferred the games themselves to remain genuine contests. She later also skated for the Philadelphia Warriors, spent nine years with the Los Angeles Thunderbirds, and captained the New York Bombers.

In 1972, Sowinski appeared in Kansas City Bomber, a movie set in the world of roller derby. She finally retired from the sport in the early 1980s, taking a job at Thomas Jefferson University Hospital in Philadelphia, living with her female partner. Judy returned to skating several times in the 80's and skated her last game in March 1992 at the Hershey Arena for the IRSD league run by Bob Raskin.

Sowinski returned to roller derby in 2003, coaching the Penn Jersey She Devils, initially on an unpaid basis. In 2004, she was inducted into the Roller Derby Hall of Fame.
