= Bill Bogash =

American roller skater

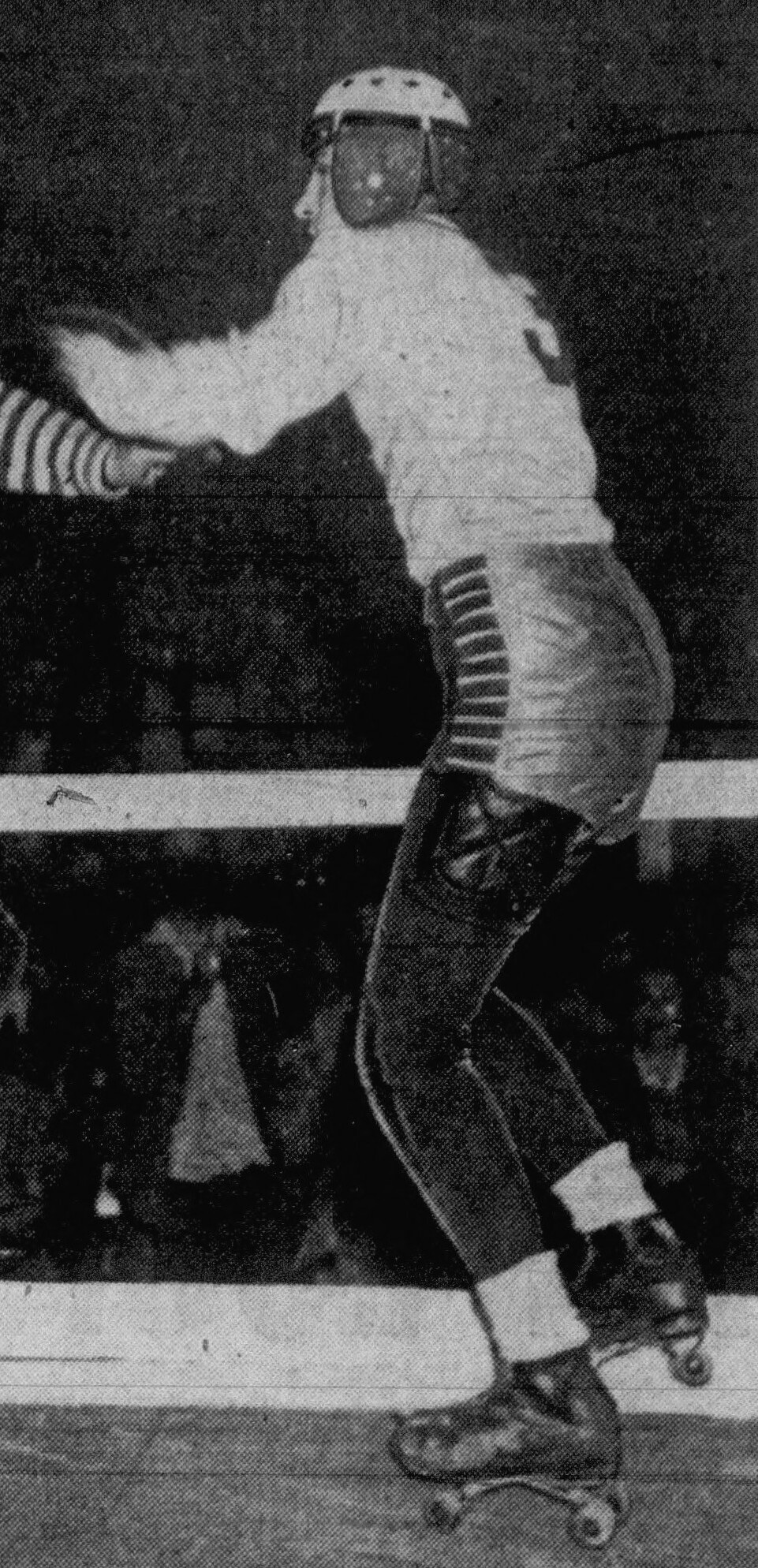
Bogash, circa 1942

Bill "Flash" Bogash (November 22, 1916 – March 20, 2009) was a roller derby skater and coach.

Born in Chicago, he began his career in 1935 during the Great Depression, and skated until 1958.

Bogash's career began after he and his mother attended the first Transcontinental Roller Derby in Chicago on August 13, 1935, a six-week race that tracked skaters' total distance traveled in laps around a track on a US map. He and his mother, Josephine 'Ma' Bogash, joined the second race in September of that year, in Kansas. After racing with many teams throughout the 1940s, Bogash led the New York Chiefs to their first Roller Derby World Championship in 1949. Towards the end of his career, Bogash skated for the Los Angeles Braves.

After retirement in 1958, Bogash went on to be a restaurateur in Los Angeles, California, with some of the most incredible steaks and twice-cooked potatoes on Earth. He died of respiratory failure on March 20, 2009.

Bogash was inducted into the National Roller Derby Hall of Fame in 1953.
