= American Roller Skating Derby =

Roller derby league

The American Roller Skating Derby (ARSD) was a professional roller derby league. As of 2012, the ARSD consisted of six teams: the San Francisco Bay Bombers, the Los Angeles Firebirds (formerly the San Diego Firebirds), the Chicago Pioneers, the Brooklyn Red Devils, the Eastern Chiefs (aka the New York Chiefs) and the Orlando Thunder. Most trained and competed in the East Bay area (near San Francisco, California), but one team, the Firebirds, was based in Escondido, near San Diego.

Unlike leagues in the past, the ARSD invested in building a new track, and new uniforms. Ferrari made arrangements to have the tracks up at different venues for additional training, and in some cases, for a week or more at a time. The league also used former skating stars Delores "Tillie" Tucker, "Bad Boy" Alphonso Reyes, Larry Lewis, "Mizz" Georgia Hase and Jim Fitzpatrick as coaches and mentors during these training sessions. Dan Ferrari died December 14, 2016, and the league has since disbanded.

== History ==
The ARSD was established in 1997 by Dan Ferrari.

== Matches ==
- A match between the Bay Bombers and the Chicago Pioneers was skated on October 14, 2006 at the Alameda venue.
- A game skated between the Bay Bombers and Brooklyn Red Devils drew nearly 1,700 fans at the Kezar Pavilion on April 28, 2007.
- On July 7, 2007 the San Francisco Bay Bombers lost to the Brooklyn Red Devils at the Cow Palace in San Francisco, CA.
- The San Francisco Bay Bombers defeated the Chicago Pioneers on July 14, 2007 at the Cow Palace.
- The ARSD skated an interleague game between the Bay Bombers and Ralphie's Roller Stars on August 11, 2007 at the Industry Hills Expo Center in the City of Industry, CA.
- On August 18, 2007, the ARSD set their new attendance record when they drew 2,045 people at the Kezar Pavilion when the San Francisco Bay Bombers defeated the Chicago Pioneers.
- The World Championship Cup games were skated on October 13, 2007 at the Kezar Pavilion in San Francisco, in front of approximately 2,400 people. The hometown Bay Bombers defeated the Brooklyn Red Devils to take the championship. The Red Devils defeated the Pioneers in game one, the Bay Bombers defeated the Pioneers in game two.
- On October 13, 2012, the Brooklyn Red Devils defeated the San Francisco Bay Bombers 52-48 to win the ARSD World Championship for the first time. General manager Mizz Georgia Hase retired soon after the game, and also won Manager of the Year.
