= Toughie Brasuhn =

American roller derby skater (1923–1971)

Midge Brasuhn
Personal information
- Nicknames: Midge, Toughie, Brazooni
- Nationality: American
- Born: January 27, 1923
- Died: August 9, 1971 (aged 48)
- Height: 4 ft 11 in (1.50 m)
- Weight: 150 lb (68 kg)

Sport
- Sport: Roller derby
- Team: Brooklyn Red Devils
- Turned pro: 1941
- Retired: 1962

Marjorie Clair Louise Theresa Brasuhn Monte (January 27, 1923 – 9 August 1971), known as Midge "Toughie" Brasuhn, was a roller derby skater.

Born in St Louis, Missouri, to a German-American family, Brasuhn acquired the nickname "Midge" as a child by virtue of her height - only 4'11". She joined the roller derby in 1941, in Minneapolis, and soon married Ken Monte, a fellow skater.

Brasuhn rose to fame in the late 1940s with a billboard campaign showing her with green dye on her face asking the question "Who Is Toughie?". She regularly competed against Gerry Murray, sometimes on a one-to-one basis; in 1949, the rollerskater took a leading role in the film Roller Derby Girl. In 1950, she was voted one of the ten leading sportswomen by the Sportswriters of America, and she became the captain of the Brooklyn Red Devils. She was known for her aggressive play, and would sometimes knee her opponents in the jaw.

Brasuhn retired from competition in 1962, and was subsequently inducted into the Roller Derby Hall of Fame. In the mid-1960s, she briefly skated with the rival Roller Games, before moving with her son to Honolulu, where she died unexpectedly in 1971.
