= Kezar Pavilion =

Arena in California, United States

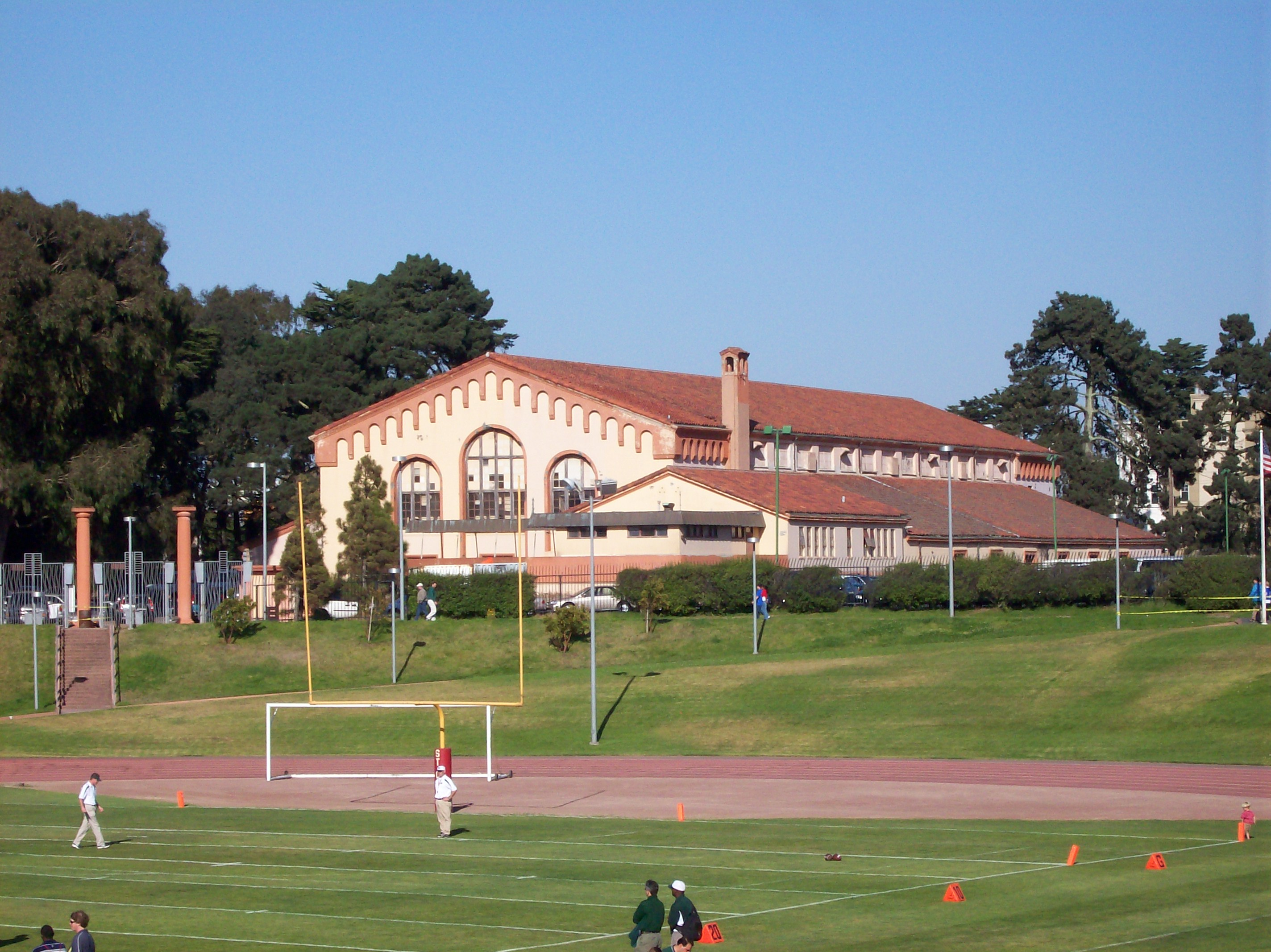
- Interactive map of Kezar Pavilion
- Location: 755 Stanyan Street; San Francisco, California
- Coordinates: 37.767458°N 122.453903°W
- Owner: City and County of San Francisco
- Operator: San Francisco Recreation & Parks Department
- Capacity: 4,000

Construction
- Opened: 1924
- Architect: Willis Polk

Tenants
- San Francisco Dons (NCAA) 1924–1958; Santa Clara Broncos (NCAA) 1927–1951; San Francisco Pro-Am 1979–present San Francisco Pilots (ABA) 2005–2007; Academy of Art (NCAA) 2006–2025; San Francisco Rumble (ABA) 2007–2015; San Francisco City Cats (ABA) 2018–2023

Website
- Kezar Pavilion

Kezar Pavilion, located adjacent to Kezar Stadium, is an indoor arena in the southeast corner of Golden Gate Park, San Francisco, California, United States (US). Built in 1924, the Pavilion seats 4,000 people and is owned and operated by the City of San Francisco. The venue is home to the annual San Francisco Pro-Am tournament. It was previously home to the San Francisco Dons (NCAA Division I), Santa Clara Broncos (NCAA Division I), San Francisco Pilots (ABA), San Francisco Rumble (ABA), San Francisco City Cats (ABA), and Academy of Art Urban Knights (NCAA Division II).

== Sports ==
The University of San Francisco basketball team used Kezar Pavilion before War Memorial Gymnasium was constructed. The Santa Clara Broncos also used the pavilion for home games from 1927 until World War II, due to alumni and fans being centrally located in San Francisco. The most regular tenant of Kezar Pavilion was the co-ed roller derby team, the San Francisco Bay Bombers. The Bombers skated home games at the venue from 1961 to the end of the original Roller Derby league in 1973. Games played by the Bombers were videotaped and shown to a TV network of more than 100 stations.

In 2007 the San Francisco Bay Bombers and roller derby returned to the pavilion. Kezar was not only used by the Bombers for home season games, but the team also held tryouts in the building. In 2011 the Bay Area Derby Girls hosted their first double-header at the pavilion.

In 2006 Kezar Pavilion became the home of ChickFight female professional wrestling tournaments, and San Francisco Pro Wrestling company Fog City Wrestling secured the Kezar pavilion as their new home in 2008 due to an increase in demand.

As of 2013, Kezar is also a venue for San Francisco high school basketball games. The arena has accommodated numerous different sports, ranging from middle school volleyball to professional boxing. The versatility of the arena means that the differing requirements of various sports can be met, from professional basketball game to recreational indoor soccer. Kezar was discussed as a possible badminton or table tennis venue, for the purpose of training or qualifying, for San Francisco's 2012 Summer Olympics bid.

== San Francisco Summer League Pro-Am ==
Kezar Pavilion is home to the San Francisco Summer League Pro-Am. The San Francisco Pro-Am Summer League Pro-Am is for former and current male and female professional and/or college basketball players. High school players are also welcome to participate in the league. Men and women do not play against each other and are in separate leagues. The San Francisco Summer League Pro-Am originally started in 1979 and has continued each summer since then. The league is supported by the San Francisco Recreation & Parks Department summer programming. The idea behind the summer Pro-Am league is that it adds to the quality of life around the Bay Area and provide locals with an opportunity to see high level competition at no cost. At no cost, the league has become a place for those who cannot afford to attend local college or professional basketball games.

There are no league tryouts for the San Francisco Pro-Am. There is an open-roster policy all season long if the head coach wants to add players. Coaches for each team hand select players for their teams. The season begins in June and ends in August. Games are played Monday-Thursday and are all played at 8:00PM. NBA players in the Pro-Am have included Steph Curry, Aaron Gordon, Jason Kidd, and Jason Richardson. WNBA players to play in the women's league have included Devanei Hampton, Christy Hedgpeth, and Jennifer Azzi. Azzi was the head coach of the women's basketball team at the University of San Francisco from 2010 to 2016.

The Pro-Am is an opportunity for professional players to interact with fans and also to improve their game. Many professional players come to the Pro-Am to train and play in a different environment than they are used to. The San Francisco Summer League Pro-Am awards MVP's (Most Valuable Player) and has a playoff format at the end of the season. The championship series is a best of 3 series, with the league champion is the first to win two games. The games operate under most professional basketball guidelines, with a 24-second shot clock. The quarter length is 10 minutes, as opposed to 12 in the NBA or WNBA. Each team has 5 timeouts per game, with one allowed if the game goes into overtime. The team with the best record in their respective league wins the regular season. The playoffs are made up of 5 teams. The winner of the regular season has a first round bye.

Many local college and high school players have participated in the San Francisco Pro-Am. Players include former Saint Ignatius players Kenny Hatch and Stephen Domingo, Archbishop Mitty High School's Aaron Gordon, and Serra High School's Henry Caruso. The San Francisco Pro-Am is highly popular among players trying to develop into better players and gain attention from NBA or international organization scouts.

The 2017 summer season champions was team Bay Pride, led by head coaches Al Gordan and Frank Williams. Bay Pride beat Dream Team in the best of 3 series. Dream Team featured the 2017 San Francisco Pro-Am MVP, Juan Anderson.

The 2017 men's regular season standings were:

- Bay Pride: 6-1
- South Bay: 5-2
- Oakland Believers: 5-2
- Dream Team: 4-3
- East Bay: 3-4
- SF City: 2-5
- Bay City: 2-6
- Bay Raiders: 1-6

== Entertainment ==
Concerts for artists such as Throbbing Gristle, The String Cheese Incident, The Clash, Dead Kennedys and Smashing Pumpkins have been held at Kezar Pavilion. Kezar is popular as a music venue due to the intimate "high-school gymnasium" atmosphere that exists, in addition to its location in the Haight-Ashbury neighborhood. Throbbing Gristle's Kezar show was the band's last live performance until their 2004 reunion.

== See also ==
- Haight-Ashbury
- Roller skating
