= Charlie O'Connell (roller derby) =

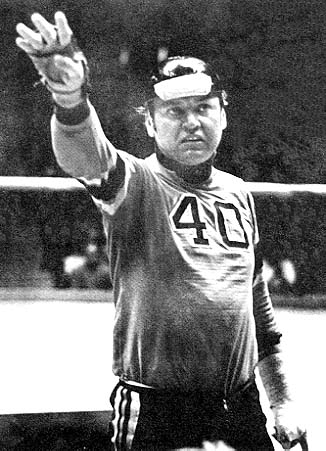

Charlie O'Connell (May 7, 1935 – February 9, 2015) was a roller derby skater, considered the premier male star of his sport. He was inducted into the Roller Derby Hall of Fame in 1967, after his first retirement.

A native New Yorker, at 6 ft 1 in (1.85 m) and 200 pounds (91 kg), he was one of the larger and speedier players, considered a "prototype pivotman". He made an immediate impact in his 1953 debut season with the New York Chiefs and was named rookie of the year. Nicknamed "Mr. Roller Derby", he went on to win the league's Most Valuable Player award eight times. He was most commonly associated with the San Francisco Bay Bombers for most of his career.

He initially retired in 1967, but soon returned to the sport and played until 1978, before finally hanging up his skates for good. He estimated he had played "well over 3000 games" during his career.

He was one of the focal points of the 1971 documentary film Derby. He died aged 79 on February 9, 2015.

Sporting positions
Preceded by Ken Monte	International Roller Derby League Male MVP; 1963	Succeeded by Bob Hein
Preceded by Bob Hein	International Roller Derby League Male MVP joint with Buddy Atkinson Jr., Bob Hein and Bob Woodbury; 1965	Succeeded by Buddy Atkinson, Jr.
Preceded by Tony Roman	International Roller Derby League Male MVP; 1970	Succeeded by ?
