= Joan Weston =

American roller derby skater (1935–1997)

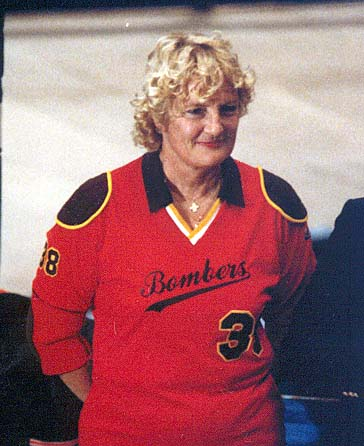
JOAN WESTON, Madison Square Garden, November 1986

Joan Weston or Joanie Weston (January 20, 1935 – May 10, 1997), known as the "Blonde Bomber", "Blonde Amazon", "Golden Girl", and "Roller Derby Queen", was an American athlete and was the most famous personality in the original Roller Derby.

== Biography ==
Weston was born in Huntington Beach, California, in 1935, and grew up in nearby Downey.

In 1954, Weston joined the original Roller Derby headed by promoter Leo Seltzer, becoming a favorite member of the Los Angeles Braves. Her fame increased markedly when in 1965 she was appointed captain of the San Francisco Bay Bombers. She appeared on 19 consecutive all-star teams in that sport, and was the highest-paid female athlete in the 1960s and 1970s.

Joan usually skated as the distaff heroine of the sport, no matter what team she appeared with. She remains the most beloved of all historical Roller Derby stars. Her long-time rivals on the track included Ann Calvello (August 1, 1929 – March 14, 2006), Cathie Read (August 17, 1940-September 26, 2024), Sandy Dunn (b. January 8, 1945), Jan Vallow (September 21, 1940-October 24, 2024), and Margie Laszlo (November 8, 1942-March 15, 2025). The 1972 film Kansas City Bomber, starring Raquel Welch, was supposedly inspired by (but not based on) Weston.

Weston was a mentor to many professional Roller Derby skaters that made it on a team. She was said to take rookies under her wing.

Roller Derby was not Weston's only sport. While a student at Mount St. Mary's College, Weston played softball. She was also involved in surfing and canoeing. In 1962 she won the Hawaii canoe outrigger championship.

Weston later married Nick Scopas (b. June 3, 1938) who was also a professional Roller Derby Skater.

After her Roller Derby career, she regularly played softball in San Francisco Bay Area leagues.

In 1997, at age 62, Weston succumbed to Creutzfeldt–Jakob disease in Hayward, California.

In 1999, her life story was sold to Goldie Hawn Productions.

Roller Derby ceased operations in 1973 and as a result the most famous female skater in the sport was never inducted into its Hall of Fame. In 2004, the skater/fan based Roller Derby Hall of Fame based in Brooklyn, New York, corrected this oversight.

Sporting positions
Preceded by New award	International Roller Derby League Female MVP; 1961	Succeeded by Bobbie Mateer
Preceded by Margie Laszlo	International Roller Derby League Female MVP; 1968	Succeeded by Sandy Dunn
