= Ann Calvello =

American roller derby skater

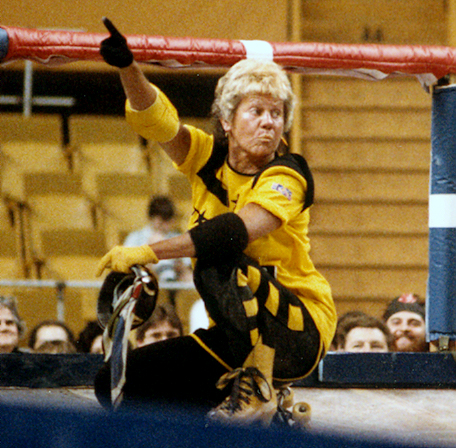
Ann Calvello, Buffalo, NY - April 27, 1986

Ann Theresa Calvello (August 1, 1929 – March 14, 2006) was an American athlete and notable personality in the sport of roller derby.

Ann Calvello graduated from Presentation High School in San Francisco in June 1947.

Calvello competed in roller derby in seven decades, the 1940s through the 2000s. She broke into the sport in 1948 originally skating for a league called International Roller Speedway. Skating with the original Roller Derby, beginning in 1948, she would be named women's 'Captain' of her team within six months. Calvello, who often sported dyed hair and color-coordinated uniforms, was known for her temper. She was nicknamed "Banana-Nose" by legendary skater, Buddy Atkinson, Sr.. She traveled the world skating in Europe, Guam, Philippines, Cuba, Australia and all over the United States. She broke her nose 12 times during her career. Her most famous rival on the track was Joan Weston.

Ann gave birth to a daughter, Teri Ann Langley-Conte, on August 11, 1953. She was a perennial Roller Derby All-Star and league MVP in 1963 skating with the Mexico City Cardenales. After skating with the rival Roller Games league for two years, she was inducted into the Roller Derby Hall of Fame when she returned to the original Derby in 1968.

In 2001, Demon of The Derby, a biographical documentary film about Calvello, was completed by Fireproof Productions. It has been released on DVD, and is occasionally screened at fundraisers organized by roller derby leagues.

The primary investor in 'Demon of the Derby,' Gary Powers, a fan from Brooklyn, NY, would start 'Roller Derby Foundation,' in order to raise money to assist Calvello who was working in a grocery store and as a ticket taker for the SF Forty-Niners. Calling Powers her 'son,' Calvello would donate her vast collection of Roller Derby memorabilia to Powers, who reopened the National Roller Derby Hall of Fame in 2004.

In 2005, Calvello contributed many rare photos and clippings from her personal collection to the book Roller Derby Classics…and more! by Jim Fitzpatrick, self-published via Trafford Publishing. She also wrote the foreword to the book.

On February 27, 2006, Calvello was featured in the reality television show Rollergirls that was broadcast on the A&E Network. In the episode, filmed in 2005, members of the TXRD Lonestar Rollergirls traveled to California in search of Cavello, their hero. TXRD has named their championship the Calvello Cup in her honor. Calvello also appeared in the season finale where the Rhinestone Cowgirls and the Holy Rollers battled for the championship.

Calvello last resided in San Bruno, California with partner, Billy Prieto, and her cats. She never officially retired from roller derby, but had not competed since 2000, although in 2001 she returned to the track one final time to win a match race with Kenneth Loge III on the finale of RollerJam. In early 2006, she was diagnosed with liver cancer, and died at the age of 76 soon after.

Sporting positions
Preceded by Bobbie Mateer	International Roller Derby League Female MVP; 1963	Succeeded by Carol Meyer
