= Leo Seltzer =

American roller derby executive (1903–1978)

Leo Seltzer

Leo A. Seltzer (April 5, 1903 – January 30, 1978) is generally credited as the creator of the sport of roller derby, and was the founder and head of the original Roller Derby league from 1935 until his son Jerry Seltzer took over the business in 1958.

== Early life ==
Seltzer was born in Helena, Montana on April 5, 1903.

Seltzer attended Lincoln High School in Portland, Oregon where he was a member of the school's basketball team. He competed in the amateur and semi-pro basketball circuits in Portland after high school.

As a young adult, Seltzer was in the motion picture distributing field with the Universal film company. This eventually led him to own a chain of struggling movie theaters in Oregon.

In 1929, after observing the popularity of cash prize-awarding dance marathons among out-of-work contestants and spectators, Seltzer sought ways to capitalize on the trend. In 1931, he helped organize and promote "walkathon"s, which at that time was another name for dance marathons, since most dancers ended up merely shuffling around for the duration of the contests, which could run as long as 40 days. His first commercial walkathon was held in Denver, Colorado, with twenty-two more to follow, including events at the Lotus Isle amusement park in Portland, Oregon. He grossed $2 million before retiring, citing that the events had become "vulgar."

Seltzer moved his family to Chicago in 1933, and began booking events into the Chicago Coliseum, a fortress-like structure at 15th & Wabash.

== Transcontinental Roller Derby ==
Bicycle races and dance marathons were very popular at the time, and in previous decades there had been successful 24-hour and multi-day roller skating races, at least one of which was called a "roller derby" in the press.

Seltzer began jotting ideas onto the tablecloth, incorporating these popular entertainment forms with a roller skating theme. The name Roller Derby was trademarked on July 14, 1935 (No. 336652). On August 13, 1935, 20,000 spectators filled the Chicago Coliseum to see 'Colonel' Leo Seltzer's Transcontinental Roller Derby, a mythical marathon race from one end of the country to the other which incorporated both male and female participants on a banked track.

Seltzer's decision to use women was a double-edged sword for the sport, since it guaranteed a large female audience at a sporting event, but the presence of women athletes made the mainstream press view Roller Derby as a sideshow, not a legitimate sport. The premier race in Chicago was a tremendous success, but subsequent engagements throughout the country were not as successful, and Seltzer's entire enterprise almost ended with a tragic bus crash in 1937 when nineteen members of a touring group of Roller Derby skaters and support personnel were killed.

== Personal life and death ==
Leo was married to Rose Weinstein Seltzer from 1926 to 1942 when she died from breast cancer. They had two children. From April 19, 1942 to December 11, 1944, Seltzer was married to Lois Reynolds Atkins who had worked for him as the manager of his Arcadia Roller Rink in Chicago. When she married, Atkins turned over management of the rink to a relative named Phil Hayes, and she continued to draw income from a concession business she operated there. One month after their marriage, Seltzer turned over operation of the rink to Atkins and a partner, Fred Morelli. In late 1943, Seltzer asked Atkins to transfer her half of the partnership to him, which she refused. In January 1944, Seltzer colluded with Hayes to overdraw the Atkins-Morelli partnership's account. The partnership was then replaced by one in which Atkins, Morelli, Seltzer and Sol Morelli had equal interests. Atkins claimed, in a 1950 lawsuit disputing her income taxes, that Seltzer, seeking to evade taxes, only allowed her into the new partnership after she agreed, in writing, to deposit her earnings into a joint bank account the two of them shared for payment of living expenses. She filed for divorce two months after the partnership was formed, and the divorce was granted that December.

Seltzer died January 31, 1978.

== See also ==
- History of roller derby
