= RollerGames (video game) =

- Arcade flyer
- Developer: Konami
- Publisher: Konami
- Composer: Atsushi Fujio
- Platforms: Arcade, NES
- Release: NES: NA: September 1990; PAL: October 24, 1991; Arcade: JP: February 1991; US: March 1991; EU: April 1991
- Genre: Sports
- Modes: Single-player; Multiplayer

RollerGames is the name of two 1990 Konami video games, one a coin-operated arcade game by, the other a Nintendo Entertainment System game, and both based on the television show of the same name. This arcade game is faithful to the show unlike the NES version of RollerGames, which is a side-scrolling game. The game is for two players and features all the skaters and managers from the league.

== Teams and Managers (both games) ==
- Los Angeles Thunderbirds: Bill Griffiths, Jr.
- Hot Flash/Hollywood Hot Flash: "El Fabuloso" Juan Valdez-Lopez
- Rockers: DJ Terrigno, the "entertainment attorney"
- Bad Attitude: Ms. Georgia Hase
- Maniacs: John "Guru" Drew (erroneously referred to in the game as "Guru Grew")
- Violators: The Skull

== Gameplay (Arcade version) ==
Players can choose from the 6 teams in RollerGames.

Score values are cut in half from the real show (and rounded up if needed), and feature only four 99-second cycles instead of 45-second cycles within four 6-minute periods.

The players control the two jetters. After referee Don Lastra blows his whistle to begin the cycle, the first lap leads the jetters to the Wall of Death (the heavily banked curve of the jetwave). They get one point for getting three steps in the between the two red lines and three points for getting above the top line. On the jet jump, they get three points for landing beyond the 12-foot marker and one point for landing in front of the line. The rest of the cycle awards one point passing or fighting off opposing blockers (who come back to haunt the jetters afterwards) and three points for lapping or fighting off the opposing jetter. The team with the most points wins. Should the scores be tied; extra cycles are played until there is a winner. (The game does not utilize the alligator pit used in the show's sudden death overtime.)

A player cannot advance to the next game until they win the current game. Once they defeat all five teams, they are treated to a credit sequence showing the trophy (the Commissioner's Cup), and the lineup of skaters. The game then restarts with the first team.

While it doesn't affect the score of the game (only awarding a small amount of "power" to the winner), there is a bonus Street Fighter II style fight that may happen to illustrate the violence and rivalry that happens on RollerGames. Winning a fight earns bonus energy to the player (as when energy is depleted, a life is lost, and losing all lives requires the player to insert another credit to continue the game). These fights pop up at random.

== External links (for arcade version) ==
- RollerGames at MobyGames
- Rollergames - Videogame by Konami | Museum of the Game
- Rollergames at GameFAQs

RollerGames
- Developer: Konami
- Publisher: Ultra Software Corporation
- Platform: NES
- Release: NA: September 1990; PAL: October 24, 1991

== NES version ==
The game released in September 1990 in North America, and October 1991 in Europe.

The NES version is a side-scrolling platform game that employs the likenesses of people used in the television show, but has nothing to do with the sport itself. Instead, a mysterious anonymous alien enemy assists the three teams of the Eastern Empire (Violators, Maniacs, Bad Attitude) and their managers (Skull, John "Guru" Drew, Ms. Georgia Hase) in a plot to sabotage the sport and hold Bill Griffiths hostage. The game begins with announcers Chuck Underwood and David Sams commenting about the commissioner (Griffiths) being taken hostage by the three rough teams, and he can only be rescued by the Western Alliance (T-Birds, Hot Flash, Rockers).

The game then has Shelley Jamison asking the player which of the three teams they would wish to join; the player can choose a different team for each stage. Once the choice is made, the stage begins.

The skaters the player can play as are as follows:

- T-Birds: Robert Smith (the "Icebox")
- Hot Flash: Vicki McEuen (the "Sly Fox")
- Rockers: Mike Flannigan (the "California Kid")

Each odd-numbered stage has a course the player must navigate around within a specified time limit, all the while fighting off enemies (the skaters and goons of the Eastern Empire teams), culminating in a boss fight with either Ms. Georgia Hase, Guru Drew, or Skull. The player must defeat the boss before time expires. Falling down into a pit, losing all of the player's energy, or running out of time costs a life, and the game is over if all lives are lost.

The first two even numbered stages are transitional stages where the skater has to avoid all sorts of obstacles ranging from barrels to flamethrowers, and helicopters may also drop bombs to attempt to slow down or kill the skater. There is no time limit for these stages.

The sixth and final stage has a time limit which leads to a boss fight with the nameless villain. Succeeding at this stage wins the game, and the player is rewarded with images of the skaters with Bill Griffiths, and a congratulatory message from Wally George (who served as halftime commentator on the show).

== Reception ==
A reviewer for Game Player's enjoyed both types of scrolling. Another reviewer called it "a sort of Double Dragon on skates", found its graphics to be competent, and the blend of game genres to be interesting. Game Zone found it to be a fun game with good sound. Total! generally liked the game, but found the sprite collision detection system to be unreliable. Another reviewer found the plot to be ridiculous, and had deja vu of Double Dragon in the earlier levels, until some obstacle levels were reached. Electronic Gaming Monthly found the game lacked a sense of purpose.
