= RollerJam =

American television series

- Created by: Ross K. Bagwell Sr.; Stephen Land
- Presented by: Ken Resnick

Original release
- Network: The Nashville Network
- Release: 1999 – 2001

RollerJam is an American television series featuring roller derby that aired on The Nashville Network (TNN, now Paramount Network) from 1999 to 2001 on the Friday Night Thrill Zone block. It was the first attempt to bring roller derby to TV since RollerGames.

RollerJam was derived from the original roller derby, but newer skaters used inline skates to modernize the sport (several skaters, mostly older ones, used the traditional quad skates). The program was taped at Universal Studios Stage 21 in Orlando, Florida, known as RollerJam Arena for the first and second seasons (1999 and 2000) and the former American Gladiators arena in the show's final season. The first few weeks of the show's second season, which ran from August to October 1999, were taped at the MGM Grand Garden Arena in Paradise, Nevada.

== Creation ==
RollerJam was the brainchild of Knoxville, Tennessee-based television writers Ross K. Bagwell Sr. and Stephen Land. Land, a boyhood fan of roller derby, was inspired to bring the sport back to television by an obituary for roller derby legend Joan Weston that he had read in The New York Times in May 1997, and shared his idea with Bagwell, his mentor, who gave him a positive response. Between January 1999 and January 2001, Bagwell and Land, under the name Pageboy Entertainment, collaborated with CBS to stage this new televised revival of roller derby.

In May 1998, Bagwell and Land pitched their idea to The Nashville Network (TNN). The network agreed to air the show but wanted it ready by the new year, forcing Bagwell and Land to create a league, recruit skaters, build a track, design logos and uniforms, hire a television crew, and record the program all in a span of about seven months. In an attempt to build continuity between RollerJam and previous roller derby incarnations, Bagwell and Land hired Jerry Seltzer, the son of roller derby creator Leo Seltzer, to be commissioner of their new league. The first episode of the show was taped in November 1998, a week after Thanksgiving.

== Overview ==
RollerJam featured several teams of skaters competing in the fictional World Skating League (WSL). Jerry Seltzer served as on-screen WSL commissioner, although he only made a few appearances. The initial teams, each consisting of seven men and seven women, were the New York Enforcers, California Quakes, Florida Sundogs, Nevada Hot Dice, Texas Rustlers, and Illinois Riot (the original names of the latter three teams were the Las Vegas High Rollers, Texas Twisters, and Illinois Inferno; their names were changed prior to the start of the first season). Two notable veterans from Roller Games, "Rockin'" Ray Robles and "Latin Spitfire" Patsy Delgato, were featured in the second season of RollerJam. Despite strong funding and four seasons of broadcasts on TNN, the venture never became a "live" attraction. Fabricated storylines and characters in the mode of professional wrestling were being featured more than actual competitive skating around season 3 and 4, raising the ire of many skaters and fans of legitimate roller derby.

== Rulesheets ==
=== Periods ===
Games were played in four 7-minute periods with as many 60-second jams as possible; women skated odd numbered periods, and the men skated the even-numbered periods. (In traditional roller derby, the game has eight 12-minute periods, again with 60-second jams.) Jams began and ended on the referee's whistle, and a buzzer sounded to reinforce this.

=== Skaters ===
Whereas traditional derby employs a pivot skater, RollerJam did not use one. Instead, each team had three blockers, each wearing a white helmet, and two jammers, each wearing a black helmet with red stripes. In-line skates were legalized in an attempt to modernize the sport, but certain skaters opted still to use the quad skates.

=== Jams ===
In seasons 1-2, the game was played like traditional derby in that the first jam began from the black start/finish line, while the skaters had to continuously skate until a time-out was called or the period ended. In seasons 3-4, this changed to every single jam starting from a standstill start from the black line. In either case, jammers had to start from the back of the pack (the whole group) and work their way through, with the first jammer to break out winning the status of lead jammer. The skaters then got one point for every opponent they successfully lapped. The lead jammer could cut off the jam early by placing their hands on their hips.

The last jam of the last period always went the full minute regardless of what the period clock showed.

=== Penalties ===
At the referee's discretion, skaters would sit in a penalty box for violating the rules for various reasons (such as fighting), from 1-2 jams, or face immediate disqualification (ejection) from the game. Skaters frequently racked up these penalties and were willing to take it if they felt it would bring them a moral victory.

=== Winning ===
The team with the most points won the game. If the game was tied in regulation, originally the genders would continue to alternate in sudden death overtime periods until there was a clear winner. As this could go on for a considerable and indefinite period of time, it was soon replaced one skater from each team facing off in a "Tiebreaker Match Race", five laps around the track and whoever crossed the finish line first won the game for their team.

== Special features ==
In addition, special features which were not directly part of the matches would occasionally pop up:

Half-time Match races: Usually played between two or more skaters to either settle the score with another rival skater or to compete for the "Jammer" title belt.

Another unique concept was that RollerJam held special games, races and competitions in certain episodes, such as:

The Rollerjam All-Star game: Played between Company D led by Mark D'Amato and the Crazy 8's headed by Sean Atkinson, both stocked with an all-star roster of each team's key men and women skaters in the WSL.

Last Man Standing: A tie-breaker when both teams have equal points by the final period of and have to compete in a no time limit, no penalty game in a team variation of battle royal, to determine a winner. The objective of the tie-breaker is for skaters of both teams is to eliminate the opposing skaters by knocking them over the rails or in the infield of the track until one team wins, earning the winning team 15 points.

Men and Women Demolition Derby: A special contest in the vein of the Royal Rumble where the WSL skaters compete in separate interval contests both assigned for male and female skaters, which starts with three or four skaters on the track. A new skater enters the track every 20 (or 14) seconds in the order voted by fans at the RollerJam website. The contest continues until all the skaters, except the winner, have been eliminated by either being knocked over the rails or into the track's infield.

Table Race Skaters race four laps while avoiding crashing into the two tables set up on the track to evade elimination from the race.

Nightgown and Lingerie race: Similar to bra and panties match, where the female skaters are dressed up in their outfits and must race four laps without getting their outfits stripped, destroyed, or get themselves knocked off the track, resulting in an elimination from the race).

Fastest man or woman on skates race: five matches of one jammer skater from each team racing each other on the track, seven laps, the first jammer crossing the finish line wins the race.

Quad Race: A race played between Mark D'Amato and Ray Robles, the winner keeps the quad skates, loser wears inline skates for the rest of the season.

== Actors ==
Three of the most notable actors featured in RollerJam were veteran movie actor Tom Nowicki (who played the dual role of WSL general manager Kenneth Loge III and Sundogs manager Leonard Loge III), Cindy Maranne (who played Amanda Hertz, the manager of the Nevada Hot Dice), former ESPN and current CBS Sports Network play-by-play commentator James Bates (who played "The Prophet", a character in Season 4 only who would interrupt games to make speeches, and later managed the Sundogs), and stage actress and former Mouseketeer Lindsey Alley (who played Lisa Seltzer, the "granddaughter" of Leo Seltzer). Other characters included Julie Amazon (a bodybuilding skater in Season 4), Canine and Disable (minions of The Prophet who skated for the Sundogs, and "captured" Lindsay Francis during the first game of Season 4), Devo (a convict character who skated for the Hot Dice), Lil' Nasty (a "midget" who was a sidekick to Tim Washington) and El Numero (A masked luchador who skated for the Enforcers).

The most points ever scored in one jam was 28 in Period 3 of a game between the New York Enforcers and the Illinois Riot. The Riot came back from a 20+ point deficit to win 46-43 in the highest scoring game in RollerJam history. Roller Derby legend Ann Calvello, best known for her brutal feuds with Joan Weston, skated a match race with Kenneth Loge III in RollerJam's finale. She emerged victorious.

== Criticism ==
Ron Buffone, a producer for Extreme Championship Wrestling (ECW), called RollerJam "That stupid roller blading show". Buffone believed that TNN treated ECW on TNN, which aired prior to RollerJam on Friday nights, as a lead-in for RollerJam rather than a show in its own right, despite the fact that the ECW broadcast generated the network's highest ratings. Nevertheless, some cross-promotion between the two programs did occur, notably when ECW wrestlers such as Axl Rotten appeared on RollerJam as "enforcers" for the Florida Sundogs against the New York Enforcers.

== Key players ==
=== Men ===
- Sean Atkinson, men's captain of the California Quakes. Atkinson was the first third generation skater in roller derby history. His parents Buddy (Jr.) and Dru Atkinson and his grandparents Buddy (Sr.) and Bobbie Atkinson all skated for Leo Seltzer's original derby. His younger brother, Seth, is also a skater and helps run the XSL (Xtreme Skating League), which is an independent hardcore roller derby promotion equivalent to the old ECW style of wrestling. Coincidentally, Seth was also a trained professional wrestler. Sean died in early 2019.
- Bill Barker, In Season 1, he originally skated for the Nevada Hot Dice who was later traded to the Florida Sundogs for Richard Brown. Nicknamed "Captain America". In Season 4, he later skated with the Illinois Riot and California Quakes before returning to the Hot Dice in the series finale.
- Richard Brown, manager/skater for three teams: Florida Sundogs, Nevada Hot Dice, and Illinois Riot. Nicknamed "The King", he skated in the Los Angeles T-Birds' league in the 1970s and for the Maniacs on RollerGames in 1989.
- Mark D'Amato, men's captain, leader, and later "owner" of the New York Enforcers. Known as the team's (and league's) main villain or "heel," paralleling characters and storylines from professional wrestling. In a storyline, he was revealed to be Sean Atkinson's brother. Later skated in the ARDL. Known as "The Quadfather" because he used old-school four wheeled skates, Mark started skating professionally on Roller Games in Los Angeles in the 1970s, which allowed him to be grandfathered under league rules. D'Amato died in March 2002 of non-Hodgkin's lymphoma.
- Brian Gamble, a skater for the New York Enforcers, Texas Rustlers, and Illinois Riot. Nicknamed "The Blade", he is now a professional wrestler.
- Micah Martin, a speed skating champion who competed for the Nevada Hot Dice and Florida Sundogs. He's the brother of Sam Martin. Would colour his hair to match his team colours.
- Sam Martin, a speed skating champion who skated for the Florida Sundogs and brother of Micah Martin of the Nevada Hot Dice and Florida Sundogs. Nicknamed "The Flame" due to his bright red hair and speed.
- Jason McDaniel, a skater for the Nevada Hot Dice who formed the "X-Men" duo with teammate Mark Weber. Now skates for the team "Your Mom Men's Roller Derby".
- Ray Robles of the Illinois Riot, a 1970s Los Angeles T-Birds veteran and play for the Rockers on Rollergames in 1989 who threw pepper into the faces of opposing skaters. Like Mark D'Amato, he wore the old "quad" skates instead of inline skates.
- Mo Sanders, a skater for the Illinois Riot, now owns Heartless Wheels, skates with Puget Sound Outcast Derby, and coaches the Rat City Rollergirls. He also jam-skated in the films Roll Bounce and Enchanted.
- Pasi Schalin, a Finnish former professional ice hockey player who skated for the Florida Sundogs and California Quakes. His wife, Susanne Schalin, also skated for both teams.
- Eric Slopey of the California Quakes, who was involved in the biggest crash in RollerJam history when he jumped from the inside of the track over the rail and landed into the scorers' table. Would do a dance called the "White Pony" when he was out alone on a breakaway, which earned him that same nickname.
- Tim Washington, the "enforcer" of the Enforcers and formerly "Titan" of the American Gladiators. Nicknamed "Big Nasty". A cousin of professional boxer Marvin Hagler, both he and Brian "The Blade" Gamble are now professional wrestlers.
- Mark Weber, who skated for the Nevada Hot Dice and formed a duo known as the "X-Men" with teammate Jason McDaniel. Now skates with the Cincinnati Battering Rams and coaches for the Cincinnati Rollergirls. Mark is also a member of the 2014 Men's Roller Derby Team USA. Team USA won the first ever Men's World Cup in Birmingham England in March 2014.

=== Women ===
- Jannet Abraham of the New York Enforcers and Florida Sundogs, the biggest, toughest female blocker in the league. She was essentially the female counterpart of Mark D'Amato while on the Enforcers. Nicknamed the "Minister of Pain" in reference to her career as an ordained Christian minister.
- Stacey Blitsch, women's captain of the California Quakes and leader of the "Bod Squad" faction, which would skate out onto the track together and do a dance called the "Quake Shake." Nicknamed "Malibu Stacy" She later skated in the American Roller Derby League for the Bay City Bombers.
- Shay Brown, women's captain of the Nevada Hot Dice. A tall, powerful skater. Nicknamed "The Warrior Princess".
- Jaime Conemac, who played for the California Quakes and was a member of their "Bod Squad" faction. She played a ditzy blonde character and in Season 4 she hosted a gossip segment on the show called "Chatty Chat with Conemac."
- Amy Craig, played for the California Quakes and later the Illinois Riot. She was a member of the "Oral Authority" during Season 4 with the Riot. Arguably the fastest skater in RollerJam.
- Lindsey Francis, a skater who skated twice for the Florida Sundogs and also had stints with the Texas Rustlers and New York Enforcers. Although she played a "good girl" character with the Sundogs, over time she became more and more cunning and manipulative, leading to her joining the Enforcers.
- Heather Gunnin, the New York Enforcers' lead female jammer. After being out of action for Season 2 due to broken leg, she returned for Season 3 and nicknamed herself "Leather" because of the type of clothing she preferred to wear.
- Denise Loden, women's captain of the Florida Sundogs and Illinois Riot and the leader of the Riot's "Oral Authority" faction during Season 4. She gradually morphed into an assertive character who would wear revealing gold-coloured tops while with the Sundogs before adding purple when she joined the Riot. She sparked a major controversy when she said yes to marrying Sean Atkinson.
- Karen L. Magnussen, first women's captain of the New York Enforcers and leader of the "Sisters of Suffering" faction. Later skated for the Nevada Hot Dice during season 3 after playing for the Enforcers for Seasons 1 & 2 and first game of Season 3. Known as the most underrated skater in the league, as she preferred to stay out of the limelight in favour of focusing on the sport.
- Telisa Miller, a skater for the Texas Rustlers and New York Enforcers. Nicknamed "The Hellcat", she was one of the more violent skaters in the WSL, as she was more than willing to pull hair, scratch, claw, and get into fistfights on the banked track while with the Enforcers. In Season 2 she lost a match race to Lindsey Francis to determine who would stay on the Rustlers.
- Susanne Schalin, a member of the Florida Sundogs and California Quakes along with her husband, Pasi Schalin.
- Laura Weintraub, a former women's ice hockey player who skated for the Nevada Hot Dice and Illinois Riot. She was a member of the "Showgirls" while with the Hot Dice and the "Oral Authority" with the Riot for final season. Along with Stacey Blitsch, she now skates for the American Roller Derby League's San Francisco Bay Bombers based in San Francisco.

=== Non-skaters ===
- Jerry Seltzer, real-life son of roller derby creator Leo Seltzer and original commissioner of the league. Disillusioned with the focal point of skating competition giving way to storylines, gimmicks and fictitious characters, he quit RollerJam.
- Tom Nowicki, a professional actor who played WSL general manager Kenneth Loge III and his twin brother, Florida Sundogs manager Leonard Loge. Kenneth Loge was Jerry Seltzer's replacement as head of the WSL. He crusaded for morality in the sport and would not stand for outrageous behaviour on the track, actions which met obvious resistance from the skaters. His character was similar to the Cyrus character and Network stable in ECW. Nowicki is best remembered as a football coach opposite Denzel Washington in Remember The Titans.
- Jason Bates, television sports commentator who portrayed The Prophet, lackey for Kenneth Loge III, who began preaching Loge's crusade for morality. He first appeared in the series' final season premiere sending his sidekicks "Canine" and "Disable" (known as the "Moral Authority") to kidnap newly acquired New York Enforcers female skater Lindsay Francis to make her "pure and wholesome" (similar to wrestler Molly Holly's storyline in the WWE). He would later acquire the Florida Sundogs and turn on Loge. After the Enforcers defeated the Sundogs, he disappear with the league's new championship belt as the Sundogs were disbanded from the WSL. Bates would later become announcer for ESPN and now serves as play-by-play announcer for CBS Sports Network. He will trade off duties during Arena Football League telecasts.
- Lindsey Alley, former Mouseketeer and current stage actress who played Lisa Seltzer, the "grand-daughter" of Leo Seltzer who tried to form an all-star team to travel overseas (storyline) selecting Jason McDaniel as men's captain and Stacey Blitsch as women's captain. (Storyline dissolved as the show was ending.)

== Television announcers ==
- Ken Resnick (Play-By-Play Commentator, 1999; former commentator with the AWA and WWE)
- Rory Markas (Host for international airings 1999; Play-By-Play Commentator, 2000–2001; sports commentator for USC, now deceased)
- Lee "Hawk" Reherman (Color Commentator, 1999–2000; formerly of American Gladiators and later sideline reporter on the original XFL, now deceased)
- Buddy Atkinson Jr. (Analyst, 1999; former member of the Philadelphia Warriors and father of Sean Atkinson)
- Marc Loyd (Color Commentator, 2001; later briefly with WWE)
- Danny Wolf (Trackside Reporter, 1999–2001; now main commentator with the San Francisco Bay Bombers) and the voice of the Los Angeles Firebirds roller derby team.
- Julie Lynch (Halftime Reporter, 2000)
- Jennifer Gregory (Halftime Reporter, 2000)
- Cindy Luce (Backstage Reporter, 2001)
- DP Fitzgerald (Irish television presenter who hosted episodes of the series for Challenge in the United Kingdom)

== Video Game ==
A game based on the show was developed by BLAM! and published by Electronic Arts for the PlayStation The Rollerjam game made an appearance as an IGN preview. according to Neoseekers, the RollerJam video game was set for a release in the 2nd quarter of 2002, but contrary to IGN release date, as the game was supposed to be released on 2001. But no other trace of information came through about the game being released or canceled without a confirmation.

The video game itself became featured in Rollerjam as a feud, where the game was announced by EA's Steve Sims, around the halftime of the Nevada Hot Dice vs. New York Enforcers game on March 21, 2000, during Rollerjams 3rd season

== Revival attempts, failures, and legacy ==
- A 1999 attempt to start a form of roller derby in the U.K called RollerBlaze. by a small group of mountain bikers, skaters and fitness fanatics during their summer vacation after a trip to San Francisco inspired by RollerJam and the American Roller Derby League. This group held a few unofficial derby races on a banked cycle track in London played between the Southern Blue Angels and the South Coast Sun Devils, in hope to achieve the goal of forming a small 'Brit Blaze' league and organize a 'derby' game on a more suitable indoor wooden track. Around 2000 and 2001 when RollerJam ended, the league was disbanded.
- during the mid-2000s when RollerJam was at its peak, Bill Griffiths Sr., creator of the Roller Games and RGI Commissioner, wanted to bring RollerGames back under the name Rollergames 2000 (or rg2k) but without the oversaturated mentality of RollerJam and the 1989 version of RollerGames had, instead more so in bringing back the caliber and format of play as represented in the 60's, 70's, and early 80's. But could not reach an agreement with the executives. Despite the ultimatum, Griffith had optimism and determination to bring back the "real" roller games, but the plans were short lived as no agreements were meant. Rollergames 2000 was scrapped. And RGI continues to skate untelevised games.
- Around the time of RollerJam in 1996, a last attempt to get a proper old school roller derby on TV was made under the pilot Roller Derby USA by the National Roller Derby League, it featured Joanie Weston at the age of 62 and Ann Calvallo at the age of 70, and other NRDL skaters. with a game played between the Las Vegas High-Rollers and the Hollywood Stars, The pilot didn't sell; it was considered "The last Jam" and that classic Roller Derby had ended.
- After Rollerjam ended and the WSL folded, Derby veteran Erwin Miller started Rollersport in 2002 in an attempt to revive the sport of roller derby properly, acquiring former Rollerjam skaters and potential recruits, while still using inline skates and constructing a new track. However, in 2003, complications and opposition made the plans for the revival to fall through and the Rollersport project was scrapped.
- Despite Roller Derby making a return as a slightly popular but niche contemporary sport played on flat and banked tracks and established under governing bodies such as Women's Flat Track Derby Association and Men's Roller Derby Association, certain fans feel the ongoing modern version of the once-great sport is losing its touch in gameplay, contact, and skating, contradicting what made roller derby an action-packed sport that entertained and interested many. Also the current sport has too many rules, penalties, blowout games, and slow derby strategies. These problems are the general ones that are slowing down the return of the game. That's when Roller derby leagues such as the American Roller Derby League, National Roller Derby League, and American Roller Skating Derby attempt to bring back the traditional old-school professional roller derby sport, offering an alternative to fans who are sick and tired of the mainstream modern roller derby, with the promise of fast-paced skating action, athletic skaters with personality, fights, and legitimate full-contact gameplay. With the help of a couple veteran RollerGames, Roller Derby, and RollerJam skaters as well as those who also skated old-timer bouts at Penn Jersey Roller Derby banked track and NRD HOF Memorial Old Timers Game and Reunions on a regulation banked track located in Lali O's Outhoummountry backyard in Vegas. But the concept was met with the opposition of a few owners in the modern league, such as their refusal to let go of the focus being solely on the undefeated flagship teams such as NRDL's L.A. Thunderbirds and ARSD's San Francisco Bay Bombers; this overshadowed the league's image of legitimacy, as certain skaters causing intentional trouble scaring off potential talent, and certain leagues owners could not abandon the overly-fabricated predetermined format aspects of the set games, thus burning bridges with fans and the roller derby community. The leagues still continued to skate their game at venues such as the Pomona Fairplex, the Cow Palace, and the Alameda Fairgrounds, unstreamed and untelevised exhibition once a year, still drawing in fans who enjoyed the game regardless. Years later, NRDL and Roller Games owner, Bill Griffiths died on April 6, 2015, and ARSD owner, Dan Ferrari died on December 14, 2016, the league's future plans are uncertain as ARSL has been disbanded.
- In 2016, another attempt to bring back the unstaged and legit, fast-paced ultra contact, co-ed roller derby game was made under the name Rollergames: New Generation or Rollergames 2016, only this time using the Japan Roller Game variation of roller derby gameplay, concept, and ruleset played by the Roller Game League since 1990 to today both on the banked track and flat track. with the help of Jerry Seltzer, Los Angeles Derby Dolls, a few roller derby, roller games, and Rollerjam skaters, Hiroshi Koizumi Roller game Japan creator, and Daruma Entertainment. This exhibition was held at Santa Monica Pier for ROLLER EXPO 2016 and played as a world series game. with the roller games, Roller Jam, and ARSD skaters representing America and Roller game Japan skaters playing for Japan. it was marketed as the "fastest derby" with its offering of full contact, fast gameplay, and no slowing down penalties and no staged fights or set games. The exhibition was well received by its audience, with 2017 plans still to be made, but never happened, as Hiroshi Koizumi was busy training a roller derby Japan team for the Fédération Internationale de Roller Sports 2017 roller games held in Nanjing, China. As of now, Roller game is Occasionally played at the RollerXskate Arena held in Tokyo Dome City for Flat battles and X-DOME Skate Park for banked battles. highlights of These games Including the game held at Santa Monica can be seen on exfittv's YouTube channel
