= ARDL =

ARDL may stand for:

- American Roller Derby League, banked track roller derby league
- Auckland Roller Derby League, flat track roller derby league in New Zealand
