= Roller Game =

Roller Game (Japanese: ローラーゲーム Hepburn: Rōrā Gēmu) was a variation of the sport of roller derby that was played in Japan by the Roller Game League, established in 1990. Roller Game was played on either a flat or banked track, and on either traditional (quad) roller skates or inline skates. Although its name is similar to that of the relatively theatrical Roller Games, Roller Game was, according to its promotional videos, inspired more by the original Roller Derby—it is a full-contact athletic competition with strictly enforced rules and no staged fighting.

== The game format ==
in Roller Game, The jam starts with the 4-member defensive team entering the track and skating in a line. At the half-lap point, they are joined by 4 of the five members of the offensive team, who skate in a line beside them. The offensive team's jammer (identified with a solid white full-face motocross-style helmet) then enters after the two teams complete a lap together. Once the jammer enters, the pack can spread out around the track, and skaters can engage each other anywhere at any time, and most importantly, padded body armor and gear is mandatory for player's safety and protection in the game. The Jams cycle lasts 60 seconds, and Sets are used instead of periods, with the team winning the best 3 out of 5 sets winning the game. Unlike roller derby, where both teams have jammers on the track at the same time, Only one team takes turns plays offense at a time and can only have one jammer on the track at a time.

== Comparisons ==
Among the unique features of Roller Game, which was played on a 100-m oval track:

- Only one team plays offense at a time – in Roller Derby, both teams have jammers on the track at the same time.
- Only one jammer on the track at a time – in Roller Derby, usually both teams have a jammer on the track at the same time.
- The jam starts with the 4-member defensive team entering the track and skating in a line. At the half-lap point, they are joined by 4 of the 5 members of the offensive team, who skate in a line beside them. The offensive team's jammer then enters after the two teams complete a lap together.
- Once the jammer enters, the pack can spread out around the track, and skaters can engage each other anywhere at any time.
- Jams last 60 seconds.
- Sets are used instead of periods, with the team winning the best 3 out of 5 sets winning the game – in Roller Derby, the winning team is normally determined by cumulative points scored in all periods.
- Another feature of what makes Roller Game unique compared to Roller derby is the equipment, for example, all players wear mandatory hockey padding for safety and protection in the game, and the jammer wears a solid white full-face motocross-style helmet not only for protection but to make him or her easy to identify from the blockers of both teams As the position of the jammer. Also, The skaters wear proper full body uniform jerseys and pants rather than the Typical roller derby t-shirts, tank tops, shorts, and leotards.

== Track Variations ==
There are 2 Variations of tracks that Roller Game is played on:

Flat battles: The standard track used in Roller Game that only utilizes a Skating rink with a flat surface (such as the RollerXskate Arena in Tokyo Dome City.) The said skating rink is converted into a 100-m oval track for the game.

Banked battles: Roller Game is played on a traditional banked track setting. The Roller Game rules, scoring system, and gameplay are still used for this variation.

== Roller Game League ==
Roller Game League was owned by R.G. Produce Japan, Ltd., a Tokyo-based company headed by Hiroshi Koizumi (小泉博), who, in 1973 at age 15 was a star skater for the original Tokyo Bombers of Roller Games. Koizumi's company manages skate parks and rinks, and since the mid-1980s has produced roller skating related events for television, theme parks, and musical theatre.

Roller Game events began in 1990, when Koizumi organized the league's first two teams: the Murasaki Sports Cosmos and the Tokyo Bombers, the latter named in homage to the team with which he skated in the 1970s. Early star skaters included Mamoru Murakami of the Cosmos, Eiji Morita of the Lightning Jets, Takamasa Kazueda of the Delta Force, and Wataru Ueki of the Tokyo Bombers.

Initially open to men only, Roller Game League now includes women as well.

In 1993, Roller Game League hosted a male-only "World Cup" invitational in which an all-star team culled from various United States leagues competed against RGL all-stars.

== Teams ==
Tokyo Bombers

Murasaki Sports Cosmos

Lightning Jets

Delta Force

Remix Yamato

== Rollergames: New Generation ==
An exhibition game was held in 2016 at Santa Monica Pier for ROLLER EXPO 2016 to promote a new Roller derby using Japan's Roller Game Rules as Rollergames: New Generation or Rollergames 2016. This exhibition was promoted with the help of Jerry Seltzer, The Los Angeles Derby Dolls, a few surviving veteran skaters who had experience in Roller Derby, RollerGames, and Rollerjam, and the creator himself, Hiroshi Koizumi. The exhibition had America's Roller derby skater veterans pitted against Roller Game Japan League skaters on an Outdoor Banked track using the said Banked battle Roller Game format and rules. Despite that the exhibition game was well received, plans for future games were never made in 2017 or any year going forward.

== Season results ==
Roller Game League regular season results
Season	Season name	Rank	Team	W	L
1990	Rolling Spirits '90	1	Murasaki Sports Cosmos	7	4
1990	Rolling Spirits '90	2	Tokyo Bombers	4	7
1991	Japan League Match '91	1	Murasaki Sports Cosmos	5	3
1991	Japan League Match '91	2	Lightning Jets	4	4
1991	Japan League Match '91	3	Tokyo Bombers	3	5
1992	Japan League Match '92	1	Murasaki Sports Cosmos	7	2
1992	Japan League Match '92	2	Bombers	7	2
1992	Japan League Match '92	3	Lightning Jets	3	6
1992	Japan League Match '92	4	Delta Force	1	8

=== 1992 season results ===
- 1992-07-03 – Cosmos 3, Jets 2
- 1992-07-13 – Bombers 3, Delta Force 2
- 1992-07-29 – Cosmos 3, Bombers 1
- 1992-08-07 – Delta Force 3, Jets 2
- 1992-08-19 – Bombers 3, Jets 1
- 1992-08-28 – Cosmos 3, Delta Force 0
- 1992-09-09 – Bombers 3, Delta Force 0
- 1992-09-18 – Cosmos 3, Jets 1
- 1992-09-30 – Bombers 3, Cosmos 2
- 1992-10-09 – Lightning Jets 3, Delta Force 0
- 1992-10-16 – Bombers 3, Lightning Jets 1
- 1992-10-21 – Cosmos 3, Delta Force 1
- 1992-10-30 – Cosmos 3, Bombers 2
- 1992-11-11 – Lightning Jets 3, Delta Force 2
- 1992-11-20 – Cosmos 3, Delta Force 2
- 1992-11-27 – Bombers 3, Lightning Jets 2
- 1992-12-09 – Bombers 3, Delta Force 1
- 1992-12-18 – Jets 3, Cosmos 2

== 1993 Roller Game World Cup ==
- Held at Korakuen Rink in what is now known as Tokyo Dome City from May 1 to May 9
- All Japan vs. USA
- Banked track
- Quad skates

== 2001 Tokyo Dome Cup ==
- Murasaki Sports Cosmos won vs Remix Yamato, 3 sets to 1
  - Set 1: Cosmos 19, Remix Yamato 18
  - Set 2: Remix Yamato 14, Cosmos 9
  - Set 3: Cosmos 19, Remix Yamato 17
  - Set 4: Cosmos 22, Remix Yamato 18
