= King of Rock =

Studio album by Run-D.M.C.
- Released: January 21, 1985
- Recorded: 1984
- Studios: Greene Street Recording, New York City, New York
- Genre: Rap rock
- Length: 43:46
- Labels: Profile; Arista
- Producers: Russell Simmons; Larry Smith

Run-D.M.C. chronology
Run-D.M.C. (1984)	King of Rock (1985)	Raising Hell (1986)

Singles from King of Rock
- 1. "King of Rock" Released: January 15, 1985; 2. "You Talk Too Much" Released: 1985; 3. "Jam-Master Jammin' (Remix)" Released: 1985; 4. "Can You Rock It Like This" Released: November 6, 1985

Professional ratings
Review scores
Source	Rating
AllMusic	5/5 stars
Chicago Tribune	3/4 stars
Encyclopedia of Popular Music	4/5 stars
Pitchfork	5.7/10
Record Collector	3/5 stars
Rolling Stone	4/5 stars
The Rolling Stone Album Guide	2.5/5 stars
Spin Alternative Record Guide	6/10
Tom Hull	A−
The Village Voice	B+

King of Rock is the second studio album by American hip hop group Run-D.M.C., released on January 21, 1985, by Profile Records. The album was produced by Russell Simmons and Larry Smith. King of Rock became the first rap album to be released on CD, and was the third rap album to be certified Platinum by the Recording Industry Association of America (RIAA). The album saw the group adopting a more rock-influenced sound, with several tracks prominently featuring heavy guitar riffs. The song "Roots, Rap, Reggae" features Yellowman, and was one of the first hybrids of rap and dancehall.

King of Rock peaked at number 52 on the Billboard 200, and number 12 on the Top R&B/Hip Hop Albums chart. The album was given a Gold certification on June 3, 1985, before being certified Platinum by the RIAA on February 18, 1987. The album features four singles, all of which appeared on the Billboard Hot 100: "King of Rock", "You Talk Too Much", "Jam-Master Jammin'" and "Can You Rock It Like This". "King of Rock" peaked at number 80 on the UK Singles Chart on March 16, 1985.

King of Rock was ranked at number 44 on NME's list of the "50 Albums Released In 1985 That Still Sound Great Today". "King of Rock" featured a popular music video, which became a fan favorite on MTV. It featured Calvert DeForest, also known as Larry "Bud" Melman of NBC's Late Night with David Letterman fame. King of Rock was reissued by Arista Records in 1999 and 2003. An expanded and remastered edition was released in 2005 which contained 4 previously unreleased songs.

== Background ==
On their sophomore album, King of Rock, Run-D.M.C. expanded their musical palette, leaning more into the newly emerging genre of rap-rock after the success of their single Rock Box. The album signified the group's intentions to pull hip-hop out of the periphery and onto center stage.

The music on the album was created by Larry Smith's group Orange Krush using the drum machine Oberheim DMX and Jam Master Jay's scratches mixed in a guitar riff. D.M.C. once commented on this fact: "People forget about Larry Smith, but Larry Smith owned hip-hop and rap. He produced our first two albums, and he produced Whodini. The rock-rap sound was Larry Smith's vision, not Rick Rubin's. Rick changed the story, but Larry was there first. Actually, me and Run were against the guitar."

The name for the album came up with Corey Robbins, co-owner of Profile Records. He said: "I don't take any credit for the song title, but I did come up with the idea of calling the album that, based on the song title, and keeping it singular. It was so outrageous then-that rappers would call themselves kings of rock, instead of kings of rap. That would've been the obvious title, because they were the kings of rap. They certainly weren't considered rock – yet. Which is why it turned out to be such a cool title: it turned out to be true. They did become rock and roll, in a way; they did get played on rock radio. King of Rap or Kings of Rap would have done nothing for them. King Of Rock was outrageous."

"Slow and Low" was recorded as a demo during the sessions for this album, Beastie Boys had the demo on a tape and decided to record a version after learning it wasn't going to be on King of Rock. Included on the Beastie Boys album Licensed to Ill (1986). Run-D.M.C.'s version was not officially released until 2005, as an inclusion in the Deluxe edition of King of Rock.

The song "Can You Rock It Like This" was written by a 16-year-old LL Cool J.

"King of Rock" was promoted with a music video, which became a fan favorite on MTV. It featured Calvert DeForest, also known as Larry "Bud" Melman of NBC's Late Night with David Letterman fame.

== Appearance in movies ==
Three songs from this album were featured in the 1985 Warner Bros. film Krush Groove: "King of Rock", "Can You Rock It Like This" and "You're Blind".

== Accolades ==
- NME – no. 44 at "50 Albums Released In 1985 That Still Sound Great Today" (2015)
- Rockerilla – no. 12 at "Best Black Music Album 1985" (1985)
- Ego Trip – no. 8 at "Hip-Hop's Greatest Albums By Year 1979–85" (1999)
- XXL – "40 Years of Hip-Hop: Top 5 Albums by Year" (2014)
- Complex – no. 50 at "The Best Rap Albums of the '80s" (2017)

== Track listing ==
Side one
No.	Title	Writer(s)	Length
1.	"Rock the House"	Russell Simmons, Joseph Simmons, Larry Smith	2:42
2.	"King of Rock"	J. Simmons, Darryl McDaniels, L. Smith	5:14
3.	"You Talk Too Much"	Daniel Hayden, McDaniels, Jason Mizell, J. Simmons, R. Simmons, L. Smith	5:59
4.	"Jam-Master Jammin'"	Run-D.M.C.	4:20
5.	"Roots, Rap, Reggae" (feat. Yellowman)	Run-D.M.C.	3:12

Side two
No.	Title	Writer(s)	Length
1.	"Can You Rock It Like This"	Rick Rubin, James Smith, L. Smith	4:30
2.	"You're Blind"	Antonio Lucien Herrera, McDaniels, R. Simmons, L. Smith	5:31
3.	"It's Not Funny"	Run-D.M.C.	5:35
4.	"Darryl and Joe (Krush-Groove 3)"	McDaniels, J. Simmons, L. Smith	6:39

2005 deluxe edition CD bonus tracks
No.	Title	Writer(s)	Length
10.	"Slow and Low (Demo)"	J. Simmons, McDaniels	4:27
11.	"Together Forever (Krush-Groove 4) (Live)"	McDaniels, J. Simmons	3:35
12.	"Jam-Master Jammin' (Remix, Long Version)"	Run-D.M.C.	6:45
13.	"King of Rock (Live, from Live Aid)"	J. Simmons, McDaniels, L. Smith	7:26

== Chart positions ==
The album spent 56 weeks on the U.S. Billboard album charts and reached its peak position of number 52 in early March 1985.

=== Album ===
Chart (1985)	Peak position
US Billboard 200	52
US Top R&B/Hip-Hop Albums (Billboard)	12

=== Singles ===
Year	Single	Chart positions		
Year	Single	Hot R&B/Hip-Hop Songs	Hot Dance Club Songs	UK
1985	"King of Rock"	14	40	80
1985	"You Talk Too Much"	19	30^{1}	–
1985	"Jam-Master Jammin'"	53	–	–
1986	"Can You Rock It Like This"	19	–	–

Notes:

- ^{1} – Charted with "Darryl and Joe (Krush-Groove 3)"

== Certifications ==
Region	Certification	Certified units/sales
United States (RIAA)	Platinum	1,000,000^{^}
^{^} Shipments figures based on certification alone.
