= Georgia Hase =

American Roller Games manager (1938–2015)

Georgia Ann Siedenberg Hase (December 31, 1938 – July 31, 2015) — also known as "Mizz" Georgia Hase — was best known as a heel manager of two prominent roller games teams, the Detroit Devils of the original Roller Games league and Bad Attitude of the syndicated TV series RollerGames and was recognized as the most controversial figure in the history of the game. She had a longtime bitter feud against the legendary Los Angeles Thunderbirds (aka the T-Birds). It was rumored that she tried out for the T-Birds but never got her shot, so went on to skate for, and later manage, the Devils. She put that rumor to rest in an interview done on the debut edition of RollerShoot on the AVE Radio Network on Blog Talk Radio.

== Career ==
=== Roller Super Stars ===
After having a stellar career as a skater, Georgia became one of the most controversial, hated and successful managers in the Roller Games International league. She mostly managed the Detroit Devils, but also co-coached teams like the Texas Outlaws and New York Bombers alongside "El Fabuloso" Roberto Juarez and E.G. Miller. She was involved in a major feud with the original Los Angeles Thunderbirds.

=== RollerGames controversy ===
Following the end of the original Roller Games, Hase moved on to become a major player with the 1989 revival known as RollerGames. As manager of Bad Attitude, "Mizz" Hase created tremendous controversy when she filed a complaint with the World Alliance of Rollersports (RollerGames' fictional league) commission regarding the induction of Ralphie Valladares (now deceased) into the W.A.R. Hall of Fame, stating that a Hall of Famer could not actively skate. She also said that twin sisters Jennifer and Kristine Van Galder, known the "T-Bird Twins", were drafted as one entity instead of separately and that two other teams initially drafted them. Jennifer wound up going to the Violators and Kristine went to the Maniacs against their wishes until the mess was cleared up when managers Chuck Skull (of the Violators) and John "Guru" Drew (of the Maniacs) physically abused the twins, much to Hase's excitement and later disgust. Thanks to fans' voting via a "900" telephone number (years before the internet voting we know today), the Van Galders returned to the T-Birds and Ralphie continued to skate after his Hall Of Fame induction.

Hase later tried forcing Valladares to retire by filing a motion for an age limit. This prompted Ralphie to challenge Hase, John "Guru" Drew and "Skull" to a three-on-one match race, which is believed to have never happened due to the bankruptcy of the show's distributor. Bill Griffiths Sr., the commissioner of RollerGames, however, did state that the league bylaws said only a 2-on-1 match race was permissible. As a result, Skull dropped out of the race, and T-Bird skater Matt "Stars & Stripes" Bickham told Shelley Jamison in an interview that he would keep his eye on Skull.

=== Out of retirement ===
Hase came out of retirement to coach for the Southern California Roller Derby League. On October 13, 2012, Miss Hase Managed her last game for the Brooklyn Red Devils, they beat the San Francisco Bay Bombers 52 to 48 and she won manager of the year.

== Death ==
On July 31, 2015, Hase died of natural causes. She was honored by former RollerGames co-star and bodyguard Chuck Skull that same day on internet radio.

== Gallery ==
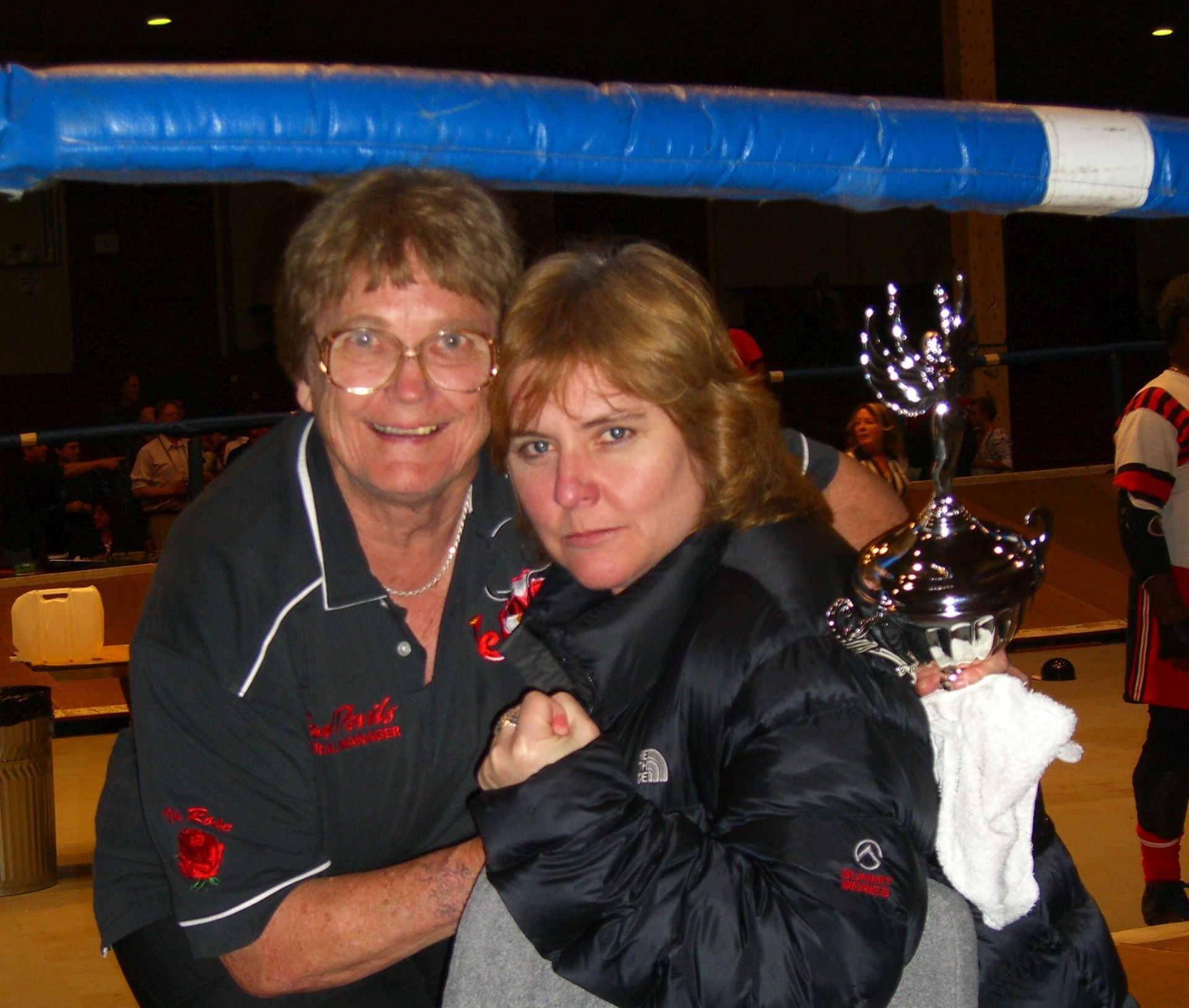
Georgia Hase and Assistant Manager at the 2012 World Championship, Kezar Stadium, S.F.

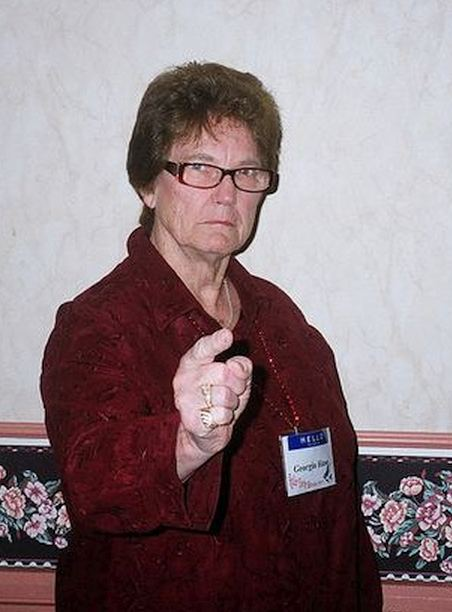
Legendary Mizz Georgia Hase!

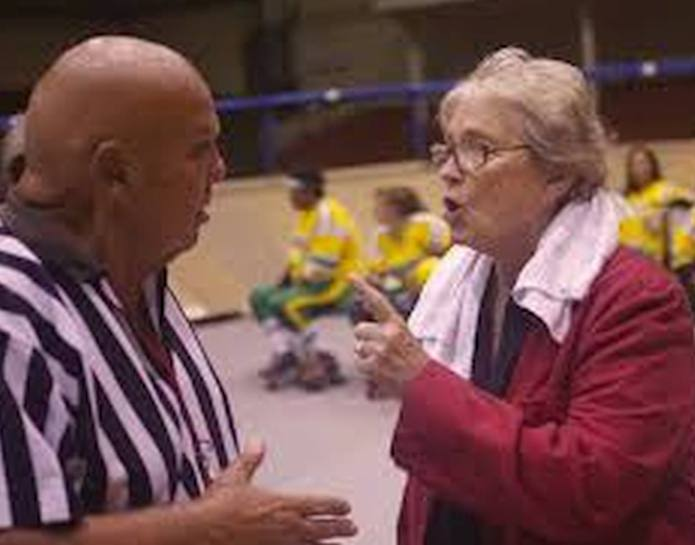
Georgia Hase at work!
