= You Talk Too Much =

You Talk Too Much may refer to:

- "You Talk Too Much" (Joe Jones song), 1960
- "You Talk Too Much" (Run-DMC song), 1985
- "You Talk Too Much", a 1983 song by Cheap Trick from Next Position Please
- "You Talk Too Much", a 1988 song by George Thorogood and the Destroyers from Born to Be Bad
