= Naomi Wild =

American singer

- Born: India Rain Quateman; July 29, 1995 (age 30); Los Angeles, California, U.S.
- Occupations: Singer; songwriter
- Years active: 2017–present
- Parents: Bill Quateman (father); Tammy Grady (mother)
- Musical career
- Instrument: Vocals

India Rain Quateman (born July 29, 1995), known professionally as Naomi Wild, is an American songwriter and singer, based in Los Angeles. She is best known for her guest vocals on Odesza's "Higher Ground", and on Machine Gun Kelly's Hotel Diablo album, most notably on the single "Glass House".

== Early life and career ==
India Rain Quateman was born in Los Angeles in July 1995, to parents Bill Quateman and Tammy Grady. Her father was signed to RCA Records, where he was a singer and songwriter. Her mother was an actress, and was in Playboy's "The Girls of Rock 'n Roll", and her grandmother, Beverly Harris, was the lead singer in The Platters. When she was born, she and her brother, Dylan, were raised by their father. She also has an older sister. She began singing from the age of five with her dad, (who is also a singer and songwriter), that inspired her father to include her vocals in a soundtrack along with his book, which features her drawings.

She attended a liberal arts school, where she learned to play various instruments such as the violin and saxophone. She would then switch schools where she finished high school at Beverly Hills High School. Aside from her parents being in the music industry, her love for music came when she was 18 years old, and she sneaked into the Coachella Festival, and saw ODESZA playing a DJ set, and she fell in love with alternative dance music.

She attended Santa Barbara City College for 3 years, where she studied psychology and philosophy. During this time, she began songwriting and reaching out to other musicians, and producers on SoundCloud, offering them recorded vocals.

This caught the attention of producer, Tim Legend, who featured her vocals for his song, titled "Hope". Following the success of the song, she was called by Roc Nation, to record a demo for Rihanna, in which she wrote two verses but they did not use them.

She would begin to work on music full-time and dropped out of college, and started songwriting and recording demos. She would then send electronic duo, Odesza, an a cappella recording of a song that she wrote, in which they responded and put a finalized version of the song with her featured vocals (now titled "Higher Ground"), on their third studio album. She then released songs like "Lessons" and "Howlin'" online, and they would respectively garner over thousands of plays.

From early 2019, she was heavily involved on Machine Gun Kelly's Hotel Diablo album. She co-wrote the album's third single, I Think I'm Okay, her vocals were sampled for Death in My Pocket (which were not credited) and as well as being the guest featured artist on the album's fourth single, Glass House. She performed three songs with Kelly, in October 2020, at the Roxy Theatre, including Waste Love, in which she sang Madison Love's part. She revealed that she is working on material for her debut upcoming project, in which she tweeted "I've waited 3 years to say this || THE ALBUM HAS A NAME".

== Other media ==
In 2003, she was the illustrator of her dad, Bill Quateman's book, Daddy Daughter Dinner Dance: A Father's Steps to a Blended Family That Really Works. The book is described as a self-help book, and the experiences and challenges her dad went through as a father, it includes poetry and as well as Naomi's art drawings.

== Musical style and influences ==
She stated in an interview that her personal style lyrically "has hints of hip hop", as well the lyrics being about things she would say in normal everyday conversation. She further stated that "melodically however, I like to be more electronic/alternative. With overall production, i like to mix hip hop with electronic elements." She listed Disclosure, ODESZA and Kendrick Lamar as the musicians that inspired her.

== Discography ==
=== As lead artist ===
- "Lessons" (2017)
- "Howling" (2018)
- "La La Land" (2019)
- "Here Comes a Feeling" (2019, with Louis the Child and Couros)

=== Guest appearances ===
- "Hope", Tim Legend (2015)
- "Hold On", Arman Cekin (2015)
- "Lock It Up", Paul Mayson (2016)
- "Wasting My Time", Niko the Kid (2016)
- "Lovers", StayLoose (2017)
- "Higher Ground", ODESZA (2017)
- "Never Enough", Madillac (2018)
- "Glass House", Machine Gun Kelly (2019)
- "Death in My Pocket", Machine Gun Kelly (2019, uncredited vocals)
- "Everytime", Medasin (2020)
- "Milka", Jozels (2020, uncredited vocals)
- "Vertigo", Zeds Dead (2025)

=== Songwriting credits ===
Year	Title	Artist	Album
2019	I Think I'm Okay	Machine Gun Kelly, YUNGBLUD and Travis Barker	Hotel Diablo
2019	Encore	Evan Giia	none
2022	Taurus	Machine Gun Kelly	Taurus

== Filmography ==
- 2022: Taurus - Lena
