= Brian Gamble =

American professional wrestler (born 1970)

Personal information
- Born: April 24, 1970 (age 56) Ohio

Professional wrestling career
- Ring name: Brian Gamble
- Billed height: 6 ft 0 in (183 cm)
- Billed weight: 220 lb (100 kg)
- Trained by: Dory Funk Jr.
- Debut: 2001
- Retired: 2008

Brian "the Blade" Gamble (born April 24, 1970) is an American martial artist and professional wrestler.

== Early life and education ==
He was born in the state of Ohio, raised in Franklin Square, New York. Gamble holds a bachelor's degree from the State University of New York and an MBA from Clarkson University. While attending school in the town of Potsdam, Brian became a member of the Fraternity Phi Chi Epsilon.

== Television appearances ==
Gamble is a Ninjutsu expert, having studied the technique for nine years. He is also proficient in amateur wrestling, Seishin Teki Kyoko, Aikido, Taekwondo, Tang Soo Do (tangsudo) and kickboxing, and is trained in the usage of a variety of mêlée and ranged weapons. His fighting skills led to him appearing on Mortal Kombat: Conquest as an extra and taking part in an episode of American Gladiators in which he set the world record in the "Wall" contest. In addition, Gamble also served as a bodyguard for the singer Alice Cooper and the band Queens of the Stone Age.

Between 1999 and 2001, Gamble appeared on RollerJam as a skater. He competed for the New York Enforcers, the Texas Rustlers and Illinois Riot. Following the cancellation of RollerJam, he returned to his study of martial arts.

== Professional wrestling career ==
Gamble trained as a wrestler under Dory Funk Jr. He appeared on the December 22, 2001 episode of WWF Jakked, losing to Perry Saturn. This match was infamous for taking place in Gamble's hometown. Gamble, not wanting look bad in defeat in front of his friends and family, began no-selling Saturn's offense. Saturn would retaliate by legitimately striking Gamble and locking him in a shoot arm lock to make him submit. Also that same night he lost to Sean Hill in a dark match.

In 2003, Gamble began wrestling on the Floridan independent circuit, achieving his greatest successes in Southern Championship Wrestling. On July 13, 2003, Gamble defeated David Mercury in the finals of a tournament held to crown the first ever SCW Heavyweight Champion. He held the title until August 16, when he lost to Thump Dupree in Mount Dora. His next title win came on December 12 of that year, when he defeated Jason Hexx to win the SCW Southern Heavyweight Championship in DeBary. He lost the title to "Classy" Chris Nelson on February 21, 2004, but regained the title on April 17 in Altamonte Springs. His second and final reign ended on May 22 when he lost to Hexx.

Gamble has made several televised appearances with Total Nonstop Action Wrestling as a jobber. On the October 1, 2004, episode of Impact!, Gamble was defeated by the then-NWA World Heavyweight Champion Jeff Jarrett. Two weeks later, Gamble was scheduled to face Abyss, but Raven hit him from behind with a chair and took his place in the match. He returned to TNA thirteen months later on the November 3, 2005 episode of Impact!, losing to "The Alpha Male" Monty Brown in a squash match.

In July 2006, he wrestled Big Tilly in Coastal Championship Wrestling (CCW), but lost the match. In February 2007, he was defeated by Dantastic in CCW. He retired from wrestling in 2008.

== Personal life ==
He resides in Orlando, Florida.

== Championships and accomplishments ==
- Southern Championship Wrestling
  - SCW Florida Heavyweight Championship (1 time)
  - SCW Southern Heavyweight Championship (2 times)
- Oxford International
  - CNC Champion of the World 2015
