= Can You Rock It Like This =

Single by Run–D.M.C.

from the album King of Rock
- B-side: "Together Forever (Krush-Groove 4) (Live At Hollis Park '84)"
- Released: November 6, 1985
- Recorded: 1984
- Genre: Hip hop, rap rock
- Length: 4:28
- Label: Profile
- Songwriters: J.T. Smith, Larry Smith, Rick Rubin
- Producers: Larry Smith, Russell Simmons

Run–D.M.C. singles chronology
"You Talk Too Much" (1985)	"Can You Rock It Like This" (1985)	"My Adidas" (1986)

"Can You Rock It Like This" is a 1985 single by Run–D.M.C. It is the third single from their album, King of Rock. The lyrics were written by LL Cool J. The song was sampled for the song "Can You Move It Like This" by Baha Men without credit. Like many songs on the album, the guitar parts are by Eddie Martinez.

== Cover versions ==
In 1996, the song was covered by Insight 23 for the electro-industrial various artists compilation Operation Beatbox.

== Track listing ==
- 7" – Profile (US)
1. "Can You Rock It Like This" – 3:58
2. "Together Forever (Krush-Groove 4) (Live At Hollis Park '84)" – 3:32
- 12" – Profile (US)
1. "Can You Rock It Like This" – 4:28
2. "Together Forever (Krush-Groove 4) (Live At Hollis Park '84)" – 3:32

== Charts ==
Chart (1986)	Peak position
US Hot R&B/Hip-Hop Songs (Billboard)	19
