= Taurus (2022 film) =

2022 film directed by Tim Sutton

- Directed by: Tim Sutton
- Written by: Tim Sutton; Machine Gun Kelly
- Produced by: Rob Paris; Jib Polhemus; Mike Witherill
- Starring: Machine Gun Kelly; Maddie Hasson; Scoot McNairy; Megan Fox; Demetrius Flenory Jr.; Naomi Wild
- Cinematography: John Brawley
- Edited by: Holle Singer
- Music by: Colson Baker
- Production companies: Rivulet Films; Source Management + Production
- Distributed by: RLJE Films
- Release dates: February 13, 2022 (Berlin Film Festival); June 9, 2022 (Tribeca Film Festival); November 18, 2022 (United States)
- Running time: 98 minutes
- Country: United States
- Language: English
- Box office: $5,682

Taurus (formerly known as Good News) is a 2022 American drama film directed by Tim Sutton and written by Sutton and Machine Gun Kelly. The film stars Machine Gun Kelly, Maddie Hasson, Scoot McNairy, Ruby Rose and Megan Fox.

== Plot ==
The film follows the last days of a rising but problematic musician.

== Cast ==
- Machine Gun Kelly as Cole
- Maddie Hasson as Ilana
- Scoot McNairy as Ray
- Megan Fox as Mae
- Demetrius Flenory Jr. as Syl
- Naomi Wild as Lena
- Ruby Rose as Bub
- Takaya Lloyd as Trent

== Release ==
It had its world premiere in the Panorama section at the 72nd Berlin Film Festival on February 13, 2022. On May 16, 2022, it was acquired by RLJE Films for an American limited theatrical release and on-demand release on November 18, 2022.

== Reception ==
=== Box office ===
Taurus grossed $5,684 in the Czech Republic.

=== Critical response ===
On the review aggregator website Rotten Tomatoes, 64% of 25 critics' reviews are positive. The website's consensus reads: "Taurus fails to delve deeply into the creative process, but still offers some engaging insight into the double-edged nature of celebrity." Metacritic, which uses a weighted average, assigned the film a score of 51 out of 100, based on 12 critics, indicating "mixed or average" reviews.

Writing for The Times, Ed Potton said that "the real-life rock star Machine Gun Kelly is worryingly convincing as an obnoxious fictional rock star in this bleak showbiz parable." David Ehrlich evaluated with B− on IndieWire saying that "at least it's a tale that Baker lived to tell, and refused to let anyone else tell for him." Writing for Deadline, Anna Smith said that "the love-hate relationship between this bickering pair is a darkly funny and touching one that, like many scenes, offers an insight into the lives of the rich and famous".
