= El Diablo (Machine Gun Kelly song) =

"el Diablo"

Single by Machine Gun Kelly

from the album Hotel Diablo
- Released: May 31, 2019
- Genre: Hip hop
- Length: 2:16
- Label: Bad Boy; Interscope
- Songwriters: Colson Baker; Ronald Spencer
- Producers: Ronny J; Nils

Machine Gun Kelly singles chronology
"Hollywood Whore" (2019)	"el Diablo" (2019)	"I Think I'm Okay" (2019)

"el Diablo" (English: The Devil) is a song by American rapper Machine Gun Kelly. It was released as a single from his fourth studio album Hotel Diablo on May 31, 2019, for streaming and digital download by Bad Boy and Interscope. The song was written by Machine Gun Kelly and produced by Nils and Ronny J.

== Background ==
"El Diablo" is the second single from Kelly's fourth album, Hotel Diablo. The length of the song is two minutes and sixteen seconds, which Kelly purposefully made short, as 216 is the area code of Kelly's hometown, Cleveland, Ohio. In the song, Kelly expresses how he "changed the way rappers rock out" when performing, as he introduced it, and other rappers took that style whilst he never got the credit. He also mentions how people hate him just by his appearance, possibly because of the excessive amount of tattoos he has, in which he laughs and retaliates the words - "you motherfuckers can't be serious".

== Music video ==
The music video, directed by Snuffy.NYC & Jimmy Regular, was released on July 25, 2019. It shows MGK rapping while driving his car around in a desert.

== Reception ==
Some outlets compared "El Diablo" to Kelly's "Rap Devil", given both tracks were produced by Ronny J. The song received a positive response due to its "very versatile" nature and being different from the other. Allmusic called the song an "aggressive banger".

== Certifications ==
Region	Certification	Certified units/sales
United States (RIAA)	Gold	500,000^{‡}
^{‡} Sales+streaming figures based on certification alone.
