= National Roller Derby League =

Roller derby league

- Metro area: Los Angeles, California
- Country: United States
- Founded: 1995
- Teams: Stars / T'Birds; Outlaws / Red Devils
- Track type: Banked

The National Roller Derby League (NRDL), also once promoted as Roller Derby 2000, Roller Blazing Derby League (RBDL, or just Roller Blazing Derby) and Roller Derby USA, is a professional roller derby league. The NRDL consists of teams that train and compete on banked tracks in the coastal cities of Southern California. The NRDL is incorporated in the State of California under the name Roller Derby Inc..

== History ==
The NRDL was established in 1995 by Lou Sanchez, Sr. Sanchez is a former Roller Games skater known for his underhanded, violent tactics while playing for the Texas Outlaws in the 1960s and 1970s. After retiring from skating, he managed various teams in different roller derby revivals.

The NRDL began with two teams, the Los Angeles Aztecs and the San Francisco Bay Bombers, skating in exhibition matches in mid-1995.

Potential investors were sought to fund the founding teams plus two more, the L.A. Thunderbirds and the New York Chiefs, in an enterprise to be promoted as Roller Derby 2000, but nothing materialized.

As of 2006, one of the NRDL teams, the L.A. Stars, is sometimes billed as the L.A. T'Birds, and the Texas Outlaws are sometimes billed as just the Outlaws.

In May 2006, the NRDL announced it was forming two Las Vegas-based teams, the Las Vegas Royal Rollergirls (all female) and the Las Vegas High-Rollers (mixed gender).

=== Matches ===
Recent games include the following:

- On March 22, 2003, Roller Blazing Derby held a pair of matches at the Grand Olympic Auditorium, featuring the LA T'Birds vs the San Francisco Bay Bombers, and the L.A. Stars vs the Red Devils.
- On November 13, 2004, a "Ralphie Memorial" game, held in honor of the late Ralphie Valladares, and featuring the L.A. Stars vs the Outlaws was held at Pacific Palms Conference Resort's Grand Arena in the Los Angeles suburb City of Industry.
- On June 4, 2005, the same two teams faced off at the same venue in a game billed as "Ralphie's Revenge".
- On July 30, 2005, the LA Stars competed against the Red Devils in "Ralphie's Roller Action" at the same venue.
