= Ken Resnick =

American wrestling announcer

Ken Resnick (May 8) is an American wrestling announcer who served as an interviewer for the American Wrestling Association and the World Wrestling Federation.

== Early career ==
Prior to working in wrestling, Resnick worked in public relations and marketing for the Calgary Cowboys, was the Media Information Director for the Minnesota Fighting Saints, was a sales manager for Chrysler, and was a sports reporter for KTTC in Rochester, Minnesota.

== Wrestling ==
=== American Wrestling Association (1983–1986) ===
In late 1983, while covering a celebrity golf tournament for KTTC, Resnick interviewed AWA owner Verne Gagne. Gagne was looking for a replacement for interviewer Gene Okerlund and offered Resnick the job shortly thereafter. Resnick remained with the company until April 1986, with his final appearance coming at WrestleRock 86. Prior to the event, Resnick appeared in a promotional music video for the show entitled the "WrestleRock Rumble". It featured Resnick and other AWA talent rapping verses in a vein similar to The Super Bowl Shuffle.

=== World Wrestling Federation (1986–1987) ===
Following his departure from the AWA, Resnick planned on returning to Chrysler, however his friend Blackjack Lanza convinced him to interview for a job with the World Wrestling Federation. WWF owner Vince McMahon offered Resnick the job after he accepted McMahon's challenge to shave off his mustache during the interview, and Resnick joined the WWF on May 1, 1986. His final television appearance as a WWF announcer was on the March 14, 1987 episode of WWF Wrestling Challenge.

=== Later work (1987–present) ===
Resnick served as an announcer for the Ladies Professional Wrestling Association during the early 1990s. In 1996, he hosted the American Wrestling Federation's syndicated television program Warriors of Wrestling. In 2012 he returned to wrestling as an announcer for Traditional Championship Wrestling. In 2018 he became an announcer for Ring Warriors, a professional wrestling promotion that airs on WGN America and Amazon Prime Video.

== Awards and accomplishments ==
- George Tragos/Lou Thesz Professional Wrestling Hall of Fame
  - Gordon Solie Award (2026)

== Other work ==
From 1991 to 1992, Resnick was the announcer of American Gladiators Live Tour.

In 1996, Resnick was appointed to the Minnesota Amateur Sports Commission by Governor Arne Carlson. He was reappointed by Jesse Ventura and Tim Pawlenty.

Resnick served as the play by play announcer for the first season of RollerJam, a roller derby program that aired on The Nashville Network.

== Personal life ==
Resnick resides in Edina, Minnesota. He and his mother lost their life savings in a Ponzi scheme run by a former friend of Resnick, Stu Voigt.
