= Tammy Hansen Grady =

American actress

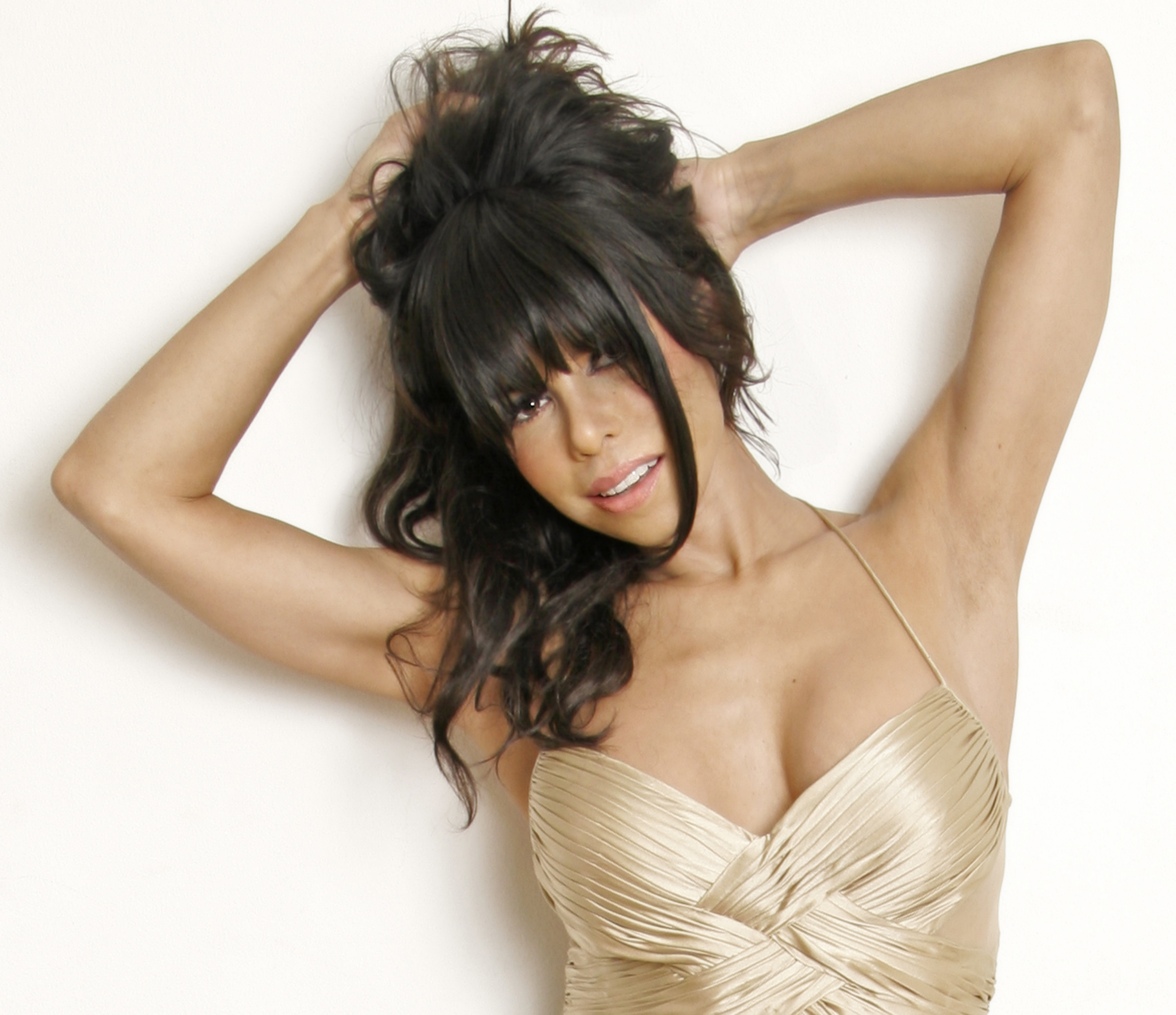
- Tammy Hansen Grady in 2012
- Born: September 29, 1970 (age 55); Los Angeles, California
- Other names: Tammy Hanson; Tammy Grady
- Occupations: Actress, singer, model
- Years active: 1990–present
- Children: India Rain Quateman (b. 1995)

Tammy Hansen Grady (also known as Tammy Hanson or Tammy Grady) is an American-born actress, recording artist, photographer and former glamour model. She was born in Los Angeles, California on September 29, 1970. She has appeared in 16 music videos. At present, she is a DP, camera operator and enjoys making films of her own.

== Early life ==
Grady is the daughter of Beverly Harris, a singer in the band, The Harris Sisters (Beverly, Marcene and Betty) on Capitol Records, whose songs include "Kissin Bug". Her mother later joined the group The Platters. Her aunt, Marcene Harris was a pianist and songwriter for Nancy Wilson and Burt Bacharach. Another aunt, Betty, was the wife of the comedian Redd Foxx. Tammys stepfather, Victor Hanson, had two master's degrees from UCLA for Theater Arts and Cinematography and she learned about cameras and got the interest in acting from him at an early age. Victor Hansen was involved in the making of the culturally relevant Skaterdater, a 1965 American short film. It was produced by Marshal Backlar, and written and directed by Noel Black and was the winner of the Palme d'Or for Best Short Film at the 1966 Cannes Film Festival.

== Career ==
Grady was an actress and pro skater on the television show RollerGames on KTLA channel 5. She also sang the lead vocals for the same show, Hit and Run and Bad Attitude. She has sung on film soundtracks to live performances in many countries. Numerous guest appearances on shows included Geraldo, the Joe Bob Briggs Movie Drive-in Show, Las Vegas Cast Party and special bits on the hit series, Baywatch. She was chosen by Playboy and was selected to shoot with Stephen Wayda. She was also selected to perform for Playboy's Girls of Rock in Roll in Las Vegas, Reno and Monte Carlo. Grady was also trophy girl at the NAACP awards, a Fredricks of Hollywood model and Ujena swimwear model.

To pursue her passion for the craft of acting, Grady was encouraged to go to London. She was accepted to the prestigious London Academy of Music and Dramatic Art in England where she studied Shakespeare in 1991. Later, studied with legendary acting coach Susan Batson, Grady did extensive study to play the 1940s star Frances Farmer for Drop-In, a theatre piece developed and produced by Susan Batson, Corey Parker and Carl Ford. She followed up with the character, Zola Taylor in the one-act play, Why Do Fools Fall in Love, about Frankie Lymon at The Stella Adler Theater in Hollywood. Meanwhile, Hollywood major casting director Billy Hopkins auditioned Grady and called her back, considering her for two pinnacle roles, one in a film, The Perez Family (Marisa Tomei, Alfred Molina and Anjelica Huston) and the other an untitled Oliver Stone picture to play opposite Al Pacino. Grady ultimately lost out on both roles, marking a turning point to give up acting for a while. "Walking out the door of that audition at the Chateau Marmont I knew if I didn't get this part, it was time for me to quit acting for a while and I'd need to face the other reality that I kept at bay or just didn't see for myself for many many years." "That being to lead a normal life... perhaps marriage, children and focus on family."

In 2010–2011, she returned to her roots behind the camera as a student at the New York Film Academy in Los Angeles and wrote, filmed and directed two short films:A Blissful Moment and Birthright.

== Filmography ==
Films
Year	Title	Role	Notes
1990	In the Cold of the Night	Model 2	TV movie
1990	Wedding Band	Uncredited	TV movie
1991	Boyz n the Hood	Rosa	
1991	Another You	Hatcheck girl	

== See also ==
- Kent Harris
