= Floor 13 (song) =

Promotional single by Machine Gun Kelly

from the album Hotel Diablo
- Released: July 5, 2019
- Length: 3:14
- Label: EST 19XX; Bad Boy; Interscope
- Songwriters: Colson Baker; Brandon Allen; Earl Johnson; Chris Malloy Jr; Stephen Basil
- Producers: BazeXX; SlimXX; Chris “ Big Duke “ Malloy; JP Did This 1

"Floor 13" is a song by American musician Machine Gun Kelly. The song appears on Kelly's fourth studio album Hotel Diablo as the seventh track.

== Background and release ==
On July 3, 2019, Kelly posted a 15-second snippet of the song. The song was released along with the rest of the Hotel Diablo album on July 5, 2019. The song addresses many topics, including his displeasure with the new generation of rappers' attempts at dissing him, his daughter "slapping" another child for talking about him, and his rivalry with Eminem in late 2018. Although it is not confirmed to be Eminem whom Kelly refers to, there is mention of "Killshot", which is the title of Eminem's response diss to Kelly's "Rap Devil".

Kelly's daughter, Casie Baker, briefly appears at the end of the song, where she whispers "Hotel Diablo".

The song is produced by BazeXX, SlimXX, JP Did This 1 and Stephen Basil,

== Charts ==
Chart (2019)	Peak position
New Zealand Hot Singles (RMNZ)	22
