= Hotel Diablo =

Studio album by Machine Gun Kelly
- Released: July 5, 2019
- Recorded: 2017–2019
- Genres: Hip hop; rap rock
- Length: 37:28
- Labels: EST 19XX; Bad Boy; Interscope
- Producers: Machine Gun Kelly; Rami Beatz; SlimXX; BazeXX; Rookxx; Ronny J; Nils; Travis Barker; Zakk Cervini; Wynne; Foster the People

Machine Gun Kelly chronology
Binge (2018)	Hotel Diablo (2019)	Tickets to My Downfall (2020)

Singles from Hotel Diablo
- 1. "Hollywood Whore" Released: May 17, 2019; 2. "El Diablo" Released: May 31, 2019; 3. "I Think I'm Okay" Released: June 7, 2019; 4. "Glass House" Released: July 5, 2019

Hotel Diablo is the fourth studio album by American rapper Machine Gun Kelly. It was released on July 5, 2019, via Bad Boy Records and Interscope Records. The album was supported by four singles: "Hollywood Whore", "El Diablo", "I Think I'm Okay" with Yungblud and Travis Barker, and "Glass House" featuring Naomi Wild, with promotional single "Floor 13". The record is a rap rock album and followed less than 10 months after September 2018's Binge EP. The album's production also included Foster the People frontman Mark Foster.

It debuted at number five on the US Billboard 200. The album received generally positive reviews. Lyrically, the songs deal with problems with drugs, childhood family struggles, among other themes.

== Background and promotion ==
Shortly after releasing the bonus tracks to Bloom (2017), Kelly announced he was going to start recording "album 4". In late 2018, Kelly announced he had a title for the upcoming album. After the release of his second EP, he responded to a fan, stating that "no songs from the EP will be on album 4". He also stated that he had erased all material on the album that was already there, and would start again from scratch. One of the deleted songs, was a collaboration between MGK and Lana Del Rey, which never came to fruition. On April 2, 2019, MGK posted a 16-second video snippet of a song along with the album title on social media. The video shows a girl in the bathtub with the album title looming above her. Kelly revealed that he would be going on tour soon for the Hotel Diablo World Tour to promote the upcoming album. On May 10, 2019, a 58-second video was posted, with Kelly rapping in preparation of the album. The song was rumored to be titled "Breaking News 2", a sequel to "Breaking News" from his 2013 mixtape Black Flag. By the first week of June 2019, three singles from the album had been released.

On June 11, 2019, Kelly announced the release date and shared a video of himself getting a head tattoo with the album name inked, with the caption reading "album comes JULY 5th". On June 27, Kelly revealed the album cover art.

== Artwork and title ==
Kelly explained his personal thoughts in an interview with Beats 1 because of its nostalgic and dark feel, saying:

To me, and the reason it’s patched in on the back of my head and tattooed there, is because Hotel Diablo, it was right here—it was inside my head. The real you is never the perfect side of you. The real you is the honest side of you, and my honesty in going through my earlier years and in my 20s, it was dark. I subconsciously wanted that as the cover the whole time because I was confronting my childhood problems on this album for the first time ever.

In an interview with ALT923Radio, Kelly revealed that the original name of the album was Delirium. He explained why this didn't come to fruition:

I said that to Zane Lowe and he was... he made this point where he was like "dude, that sounds like a shitty magic show in Vegas that like only... doesn't even have a residency of like every week but like every three weeks."

== Singles ==
The first single was "Hollywood Whore", released on May 17, 2019. The music video, directed by Jordan Wozy, was released May 29, 2019. The song's lyrical content describes the music industry and how it can manipulate artists.

The second single, "El Diablo", was released on May 31, 2019. The music video, directed by Snuffy.NYC & Jimmy Regular, was released on July 25, 2019. The song is a mention of all the people who thought MGK's career was "falling down" due to the feud between MGK and Eminem. He also expresses his thoughts on the people who MGK thinks they "took credit and became famous".

The third single, "I Think I'm Okay", was released on June 7, 2019. Kelly released the song with Travis Barker and Yungblud. The music video, directed by Andrew Sandler, was released June 14, 2019.

The fourth single, "Glass House" was released on July 5, 2019. It features vocals from Naomi Wild. Its lyrical themes reveal mental struggles and drug problems, and being "all alone in a glass house".

=== Promotional singles ===
The song "Floor 13" was released on July 5, 2019. The song contains a cameo appearance from Kelly's daughter Casie at the end of the track.

== Critical reception ==
Professional ratings
Review scores
Source	Rating
AllMusic	4.5/5 stars
Digital Journal	A
HipHopDX	4/5
NME	2/5 stars

Markos Papadatos of the Canadian internet news service Digital Journal praised the lyrics and overall album sound and mood. He wrote "Overall, Machine Gun Kelly has released a solid new album, Hotel Diablo. It showcases his maturity and growth as a singer-songwriter and musician." Papadatos concluded with "Most impressive about Machine Gun Kelly is that the same energy that he exudes on this album, he displays on stage in a live setting, which is incredible." He gave the album an A rating.

Jeremy Markus of The Cornell Daily Sun gave the album a positive review, while also stating the album is a powerful successor to 2018's Binge. He wrote, "Besides the improvement in writing, the album is simply much more enjoyable to listen to. Gone are the odd hooks and off-beat rapping from last year's project; they are replaced with intricate flows and a cohesive sound that spans across the entire production."

A negative review came from Dhruva Balram of NME, who said that "Despite the potency of its material, the project's lyricism feels apathetic. While his contemporaries, from Juice WRLD to Post Malone, are pushing the envelope, crafting new sounds and forging new paths, MGK sticks to a tried-and-tested formula which, ultimately, feels bland. At times, the album feels stagnated, as if it's stuck in a 2012 timewarp." He concluded that it was "a formulaic album that's been re-worked with the same puzzle pieces: clever wordplay, catchy beats and enough meat on its body to keep it alive. But it doesn't have enough of those facets to be in any way distinguished."

== Commercial performance ==
Hotel Diablo debuted at number five on the Billboard 200, with 39,000 equivalent album units, 16,000 of that sum in album sales. It was his fourth top 10 album. It dropped to number 20 in its second week, selling 20,585 album equivalent units. In its third week on the chart, it dropped to number 38, selling 13,141 units.

== Track listing ==
Standard edition
No.	Title	Writer(s)	Producer(s)	Length
1.	"Sex Drive"	Colson Baker; Mark Foster; Brandon Allen; Stephen Basil	Foster; BazeXX; SlimmXX	2:03
2.	"El Diablo"	Baker; Ronald Spencer	Ronny J	2:26
3.	"Hollywood Whore"	Baker; Allen; Basil; Rami Edaeh; John Cappelletty	BazeXX; “Slimxx”; Ramii	3:23
4.	"Glass House" (featuring Naomi Wild)	Baker; India Quateman; Rory Andrew; Alexander Lustig; Allen	Lustig; Andrew; SlimmXX	3:21
5.	"Burning Memories" (featuring Lil Skies)	Baker; Kimetrius Foose; Allen; Basil; Earl Johnson; Lustig; John Stary; Olivia Marsico	Lustig; BazeXX; JP Did This 1; SlimmXX	3:36
6.	"A Message from the Count"	Baker; Pete Davidson		0:37
7.	"Floor 13"	Baker; Allen; Johnson; Chris Malloy Jr.; Basil	SlimmXX; BazeXX; Big Duke; JP Did This 1	3:14
8.	"Roulette"	Baker; Jacob Troth; William Lobban-Bean	Cook Classics; Jacob Troth	3:02
9.	"Truck Norris Interlude"	B. Allen; Chris Malloy Jr.; Eric Allen; Basil	BazeXX; Dontmindifiduke; JP Did This 1; SlimmXX	0:52
10.	"Death in My Pocket"	Baker; Allen; Andrew; Basil	BazeXX; Andrew; SlimmXX	2:59
11.	"Candy" (featuring Trippie Redd)	Baker; Michael White IV; Anton Göransson; Thomas Brown; Charles Anderson; Issabella Sjöstrand; Michael Foster	Anton Göransson; Tommy "TBHITS" Brown	2:36
12.	"Waste Love" (featuring Madison Love)	Baker; Madison Love; Troth; Lobban-Bean	Cook Classics	3:16
13.	"5:3666" (featuring Phem)	Baker; Liv Marsico; Allen; Lustig	Lustig; SlimmXX	3:14
14.	"I Think I'm Okay" (with Yungblud and Travis Barker)	Baker; Dominic Harrison; Travis Barker; Allen; Nick Long; Andrew; Quateman	Machine Gun Kelly; Barker; BazeXX; Nick Long; Andrew; SlimmXX; Zakk Cervini	2:49
Total length:				37:28

Hotel Diablo: Floor 13 Edition
No.	Title	Writer(s)	Producer(s)	Length
15.	"El Pistolero"	Colson Baker; Ronald Spencer	Ronny J	2:38
16.	"Bullets with Names" (featuring Young Thug, RJmrLA and Lil Duke)	Baker; Jeffery Williams; Rodney Jerome Brown Jr.; Arnold Martinez; Spencer	Wonda; Ronny J	2:49
17.	"Floor 13" (Live from Cleveland/August 13, 2022)	Baker; Chris Malloy; Earl Johnson II; Brandon Allen; Steve Basil	Baker; SlimXX; BazeXX; Earl St. Clair; DONTMINDIFIDUKE; JUS Lyons (LIONS); Sophie Lloyd	3:05
18.	"I Think I'm Okay" (Sad Version) (with Yungblud and Travis Barker)	Baker; Dominic Harrison; Travis Barker; Nick Long; Rory Andrew; Naomi Wild; Allen; Basil; Blaise Railey	Barker; SlimXX; BazeXX; Dark Waves; No Love For The Middle Child	3:06
19.	"Glass House" (Sad Version) (featuring Naomi Wild)	Baker; Railey; Naomi Wild; Allen; WAndrew; Lustig	Lustig; Wynne; SlimmXX	3:32
20.	"5,3666" (v1 Demo)	Baker; Allen; Phem; Lustig	Lustig; SlimmXX	3:15
Total length:				56:02

== Charts ==
=== Weekly charts ===
Chart (2019)	Peak position
Australian Albums (ARIA)	26
Austrian Albums (Ö3 Austria)	37
Belgian Albums (Ultratop Flanders)	83
Canadian Albums (Billboard)	6
Czech Albums (ČNS IFPI)	17
Dutch Albums (Album Top 100)	30
Finnish Albums (Suomen virallinen lista)	31
German Albums (Offizielle Top 100)	75
Irish Albums (IRMA)	54
Italian Albums (FIMI)	96
Latvian Albums (LAIPA)	7
Lithuanian Albums (AGATA)	9
New Zealand Albums (RMNZ)	23
Norwegian Albums (VG-lista)	22
Scottish Albums (Official Charts)	80
Slovak Albums (ČNS IFPI)	19
Swedish Albums (Sverigetopplistan)	55
Swiss Albums (Schweizer Hitparade)	36
UK Albums (Official Charts)	43
US Billboard 200	5
US Top R&B/Hip-Hop Albums (Billboard)	4

=== Year-end charts ===
Chart (2019)	Position
US Top R&B/Hip-Hop Albums (Billboard)	100

== Certifications ==
Certifications and sales for Hotel Diablo
Region	Certification	Certified units/sales
Denmark (IFPI Danmark)	Gold	10,000^{‡}
Hungary (MAHASZ)	Platinum	4,000^{‡}
United Kingdom (BPI)	Silver	60,000^{‡}
United States (RIAA)	Gold	500,000^{‡}
^{‡} Sales+streaming figures based on certification alone.
