= King of Rock (song) =

Single by Run–D.M.C.

from the album King of Rock
- B-side: "King of Rock (instrumental)"
- Released: January 15, 1985
- Recorded: 1984
- Genre: Rap rock
- Length: 5:14
- Label: Profile, 4th & B'way Records
- Songwriters: D. McDaniels, J. Mizel, J. Simmons, L. Smith, R. Simmons
- Producers: Larry Smith, Russell Simmons, Roddey Hui

Run–D.M.C. singles chronology
"30 Days" (1984)	"King of Rock" (1985)	"You Talk Too Much" (1985)

Music video
- "King of Rock" on YouTube

"King of Rock" is a 1985 single by Run–D.M.C. and the title track from their album of the same name. It was featured in the video games Guitar Hero: Aerosmith, Thrasher: Skate and Destroy, Call of Duty: Infinite Warfare, and is a downloadable track on Rock Band 3. The song was performed by the group at the 1985 Live Aid concert. Eddie Martinez is the song's lead guitarist and appears in the video.

Cash Box said that the song is "in the traditional boasting rap themes which touches on humor and raw social critique and makes Run D.M.C. one of the few rap groups which can transcend its original trappings."

The music video featured Calvert DeForest as a security guard.

== Cover versions ==
In 1996, the song was covered by Institute of Technology for the electro-industrial various artists compilation Operation Beatbox.

== Track listing ==
- 7" - Profile (US)
1. "King of Rock" – 4:38
2. "King of Rock (Instrumental)" – 4:10
- 12" - Profile (US)
1. "King of Rock" – 6:15
2. "King of Rock (Instrumental)" – 6:34

== Charts ==
Chart (1985)	Peak position
UK Singles Chart	80
US Billboard Bubbling Under Hot 100 Singles	8
US Billboard Hot Black Singles	14
US Billboard Dance Music/Club Play Singles	40
