= RollerGames =

- Official RollerGames logo
- Genre: Roller derby Sports Entertainment
- Created by: David R. Sams; Michael J. Miller; William Griffiths, Sr.
- Directed by: Chet Forte
- Presented by: Chuck Underwood; David Sams; Shelly Jamison; Wally George
- Starring: Ralphie Valladares; Jennifer Van Galder; Kristine Van Galder; Georgia Hase; Chuck Skull; John "Guru" Drew; Bill Griffiths, Sr. (other skaters, see rosters)
- Theme music composer: Douglas Cooper Getschal
- Opening theme: "Rock & RollerGames" by D.C. Getschal
- Ending theme: "All In The Game" by Jarrett Michaels
- Composers: Douglas Cooper Getschal; Jarrett Michaels; David Sams
- Original language: English
- No. of seasons: 1
- No. of episodes: 13

Production
- Executive producers: David R. Sams; Michael J. Miller; Burl A. Hechtman
- Producers: David R. Sams; Michael J. Miller
- Production locations: Los Angeles, California
- Camera setup: Multiple
- Running time: 60 minutes (including commercials); Premiere episode: 2 hours
- Production companies: World Alliance RollerStars, Inc. Sams/Miller Productions; Motown Productions; Qintex Entertainment

Original release
- Network: Syndication
- Release: September 16, 1989 – 1990

RollerGames is an American television series that presented a theatrical version of the sport of roller derby, and featured a number of skaters who had been in the original Roller Games league (1961–1975), as well as younger participants. It was broadcast for one season (1989–1990). The series came from the combination of Roller Games owner William Griffiths, Sr. and the television production team of David Sams and Michael Miller. Chet Forte served as the show's director for its entire run. Chuck Underwood served as play-by-play commentator while Sams provided the color commentary. Former TV reporter Shelly Jamison was trackside reporter and Hot Seat host and conservative commentator Wally George hosted halftime segments known as RollerSports Central.

After a 30-year absence, Fox Sports 1 began to air the series again on August 1, 2020 to celebrate the series' 30th anniversary.

== Format ==
The show took place in the Super Roller Dome (which was actually an airport hangar), where all matches were broadcast. Instead of a banked oval track, a figure eight track was used where one side was heavily banked. It included obstacles such as the "Wall of Death" (which was located on the heavily banked side) and the "Jet Jump." The only ones who could score during each 45-second scoring cycle were the "jetters," who wore helmets and got six points if they got above the top line for three steps on the Wall of Death without going over, and two points if they got between the two lines for three steps. The "Jet Jump" had a 12-foot marker that allowed six points if the jetter got past it, and two if the jetter landed in front of it. In either case, the jetter had to land safely. Also, there were only four skaters on the track at a time (instead of the usual five).

The rest of the cycle involved traditional roller derby elements of scoring one point for every opponent lapped. The players got as many 45-second cycles as possible within four six-minute quarters (cut down from eight 12-minute periods in traditional roller derby). The team with the most points won. The last cycle went the full 45 seconds regardless of what the period clock said.

The first jetter to legally enter the jetwave won the status of "lead jetter"; s/he could signal the referees to cut off the cycle early, by tapping his/her helmet. S/he could also enter the jetwave again for more points, but only after s/he had passed all the opposing team's skaters. (This was extremely rare, but it happened occasionally.)

As a tiebreaker, two skaters would skate around a pit full of alligators. The first skater to skate around the pit five times or to throw his or her opponent into the alligator pit was declared the winner. The debut episode was the only time live alligators were ever used, as no ties ever happened after that (although a "news report" featured another tiebreaker). The episode revealed one of the rare times that the T-Birds lost the championship, with the Violators taking it after the T-Bird skater got pushed into the alligator pit (although later footage revealed that Skull, the manager, cheated by interfering, but the Violators got to keep the Commissioner's Cup in spite of that).

Instead of a penalty box, skaters that committed misdemeanors sat in a "penalty pod," one of each was located on either side of the broadcast booth where Sams and Underwood called the action. Because the rules said there were always four skaters on the track, a jetter got one bonus point each time they passed the skater inside the pod. Referee Don Lastra (and the other referees) frequently referred to the penalty pod as "jail," and would tell skaters who got a penalty to "go sit down." (Lastra would also fine players specific amounts of money; these fines were to be paid out of pocket as a check and given to him, since he issued the fines. Fines usually were issued if the act incurring a penalty came in between a period or after the end of the game, but the players who got fined always said vindication was theirs, and thus a moral victory was earned).

== Teams ==
The "world famous" Los Angeles T-Birds were one of the teams used for the show. Other teams were the Rockers, Hot Flash, Violators, Bad Attitude, and Maniacs...all of whom were members of the fictional World Alliance of RollerSports (which is the actual legal division name of Sams' company). Many of the athletes that skated for Griffiths in the past were used for RollerGames. (The Hot Flash team was referred as "Hollywood Hot Flash" on a couple of occasions.)

Some of the most visible skaters included twin sisters Jennifer & Kristine Van Galder, the "T-Bird Twins" (two blonde waitresses that Sams recruited while dining at a trendy LA area eatery), "The IceBox" Robert Smith, brothers "Mr. Mean" Harold Jackson & "Monster Man" Bernie Jackson, Michael Flaningam "The California Kid", "Skinney Minnie" Gwen Miller, "Electric" Randi Whitman (who got her nickname because of her hair), "Stars and Stripes" Matt Bickham, "Dar The Star" Darlene Langlois, "Latin Spitfire" Patsy Delgado, "Sweet" Stephanie Garcia, and Rocker Speed Skater Michael "Fish" Fischer (along with guitarist on the RollerGames theme song, who was forced to leave the team before the first telecast because he broke his hand in practice), and Ralphie Valladares, whose daughter Gina skated for Hot Flash.

Other past Roller Derby personalities to appear on RollerGames included "Mizz" Georgia Hase, the cantankerous heel manager of the Detroit Devils and Bad Attitude, and "Little" Richard Brown, the Maniacs' top skater who got to manage and coach several skaters on RollerJam and previously skated for several teams including the Philadelphia Warriors, Baltimore-Washington Cats, L.A. T-Birds and Eastern War-Chiefs. "Dar The Star" Darlene Langlois was a former T-Bird herself, having been wooed away from the team by another former T-Bird turned Rockers manager, D.J. Terrigno. However, Dar remained on good terms with her former team, frequently coming to the aid of the T-Bird Twins after they were temporarily separated and defending them against the derision of Sweet Stephanie.

=== Rosters ===
T-Birds; Manager: William Griffiths Jr.
No.	Men	Women
1	"Dynamite Darryle" Davis	Gwen "Skinny Minnie" Miller
2	Bill "Blockbuster" Bibbus	Gina "Go-Go" Gonzales
3	Adam "Speedy" Gonzales	Debbie "the Corker" McCorkell
4	Matt "Stars & Stripes" Bickham	"Electric Randi" Whitman
5	Ralphie Valladares	Jennifer Van Galder
6	Robert "the Icebox" Smith	Kristine Van Galder

Rockers; Manager: Donna Jean (D.J.) Terrigno
No.	Men	Women
1	Mike "the California Kid" Flaningam	Darlene "Dar the Star" Langlois
2	"Rockin' Ray" Robles	Donna "Lady D" Young
3	Holly Masterson	"Deadly Debbie" Van Doren
4	Brian "The Rolling Rocker" Jacobson	Maeve "Queenie" Crommie
5	Art "Bam Bam" May	Tammy Contreras
6	John Rodriguez	Lolly Waterman

Hot Flash; Manager: Juan Valdez-Lopez
No.	Men	Women
1	Bren "Flash" Futura	Vicki "Sly Fox" McEwan
2	Jerry "Kahuna" Reis	"Party Pattie" Frazier
3	Robert "Cass" McEntee	Gina "Sassy" Valladares
4	Harold "Ice Man" Caldwell	"Irish Mary" Monahan
5	Ben Newberg	"Windy Wendy" Holbert
6	Billy "Hot Wheels" Marshall	Tammy Hanson
7	-	Laura Stafford

Bad Attitude; Manager: Ms. Georgia Hase
No.	Men	Women
1	Bernie "Monster Man" Jackson	Patsy "The Latin Spitfire" Delgado
2	David "Dr. Fu" Arizmendez	Lyle "the Brat" Morse
3	Scott "The Bulldog" Casto	Gale "The Bopper" Bowers
4	Pete "The Ninja" Christensen	Margaret "Hot Rod" Christopher
5	Todd Stern	Marnie "The Tank" Smith
6	Charlie Saunders	Sadie Chrestman

Violators; Manager: Chuck Skull
No.	Men	Women
1	Harold "Mr. Mean" Jackson	"Sweet Stephanie" Garcia
2	Tony "The Enforcer" Trujillo	Paula "The Flea" Wilson
3	Greg "Killer" Robertson	Vicki "O" Orgill
4	Bob "Shifty" Cendejas	Lauren "Sidecar" Halliwell
5	Bill "The Hook" Hukriede	"Nasty Nancy" Wilkinson

Maniacs; Manager: John "Guru" Drew
No.	Men	Women
1	"Little Richard" Brown	Denise "The Spider" Green
2	"Sunset Steve" Santillian	Lori "The Blonde Bomber" Weikel
3	Mike "The Mercenary" Dark	Masako Ariji
4	Bob "Wildfire" Ferris	Liz Ard
5	"Crazy Dave" Mezzirow	Monica "Big Mo" Garcia
6	Kavin Ross	-

== Episode guide ==
- PILOT: Commissioner's Cup
  - SEMI-FINALS: T-Birds vs. Bad Attitude; Rockers vs. Violators
  - FINALS: Violators vs. T-Birds
  - CHAMPIONS: Violators
1. T-Birds vs. Bad Attitude
2. Hot Flash vs. Bad Attitude
3. T-Birds vs. Hot Flash
4. Maniacs vs. Violators
5. Rockers vs. Violators
6. Rockers vs. Maniacs
7. Bad Attitude vs. T-Birds (rematch; see #1)
8. Violators vs. Bad Attitude
9. T-Birds vs. Violators
10. All-Star Game (Western Alliance vs. Eastern Empire)
11. T-Birds vs. Maniacs
12. Maniacs vs. Rockers (rematch; see #6)

== Storylines ==
World Alliance of RollerSports (fictional league for RollerGames)

Some of the storylines were off-the-wall, but tame by today's standards — the main storyline was a controversy involving the T-Bird Twins being drafted as one person (more on that below), rather than two. Hair-pulling and catfights were crowd favorites. When a fight broke out, the cameras frequently cut to a shot of an angry woman in a pink dress, glaring at the skaters.

The show became noted for its "big controversy:" according to a report from Sams, Georgia Hase claimed the T-Bird Twins were improperly drafted as one entity. Thus, Jennifer went to the Violaters, and Kristine went to the Maniacs. At the same time, the league office informed Ralphie Valladares that he was to be the first inductee into the Hall of Fame. This led Hase to object that, according to the rule book, Ralphie could not enter unless he hung up his skates for good. The league office did not intend for that to happen. Hase then decided that Ralphie would never skate again, as well as never go into the Hall of Fame.

After two rule violations by John "Guru" Drew (manager for the Maniacs) and Chuck Skull (manager of the Violators) of physically abusing each of the T-Bird twins, Sams and on-the-track commentator Shelly Jamison brought up how each twin's contract was null and void, thus returning them to the T-Birds. This led Griffiths, Sr., as commissioner, to let the public decide on how this situation was to go. The American public overwhelmingly elected that Ralphie continue to skate while being inducted into the Hall of Fame, and that the twins return to the T-Birds for good (viewers in the continental 48 states could vote by calling a 900 number, while Alaska and Hawaii residents had to write a letter to a specific address, as the 900 number was not available to them). The exact number of votes was 75,468, with 96% voting "YES" and only 4% voting "NO."

Although the show was canceled after one season, the show also featured an episode where Ralphie challenged the "unholy 3" ("Mizz" Georgia Hase, Guru Drew, Skull) to a 3-on-1 match race. Griffiths, Sr. pointed out that 3-on-1 wasn't legal according to league laws (during an interview with Wally George), but 2-on-1 was, so Skull had to drop out. While Ralphie dealt with Georgia and Drew, "Stars and Stripes" Matt Bickham reported to Shelley Jamison that he'd keep an eye on Skull. Due to the bankruptcy of Qintex, the distributor, which caused the show's untimely cancellation, that match race never took place. The show also offered the public a chance to dial the same 900 number and vote on whether or not the alligators should be banned from the sport, but due to the cancellation, the viewers never got to see the outcome.

Following the bankruptcy and demise of Qintex (who also distributed Kids Incorporated on The Disney Channel in 1988 and 1989), distribution of RollerGames was taken over in 1990 by LBS Communications (now part of Fremantle), which rebroadcast and repackaged 12 of the original 13 episodes (excluding the All-Star Game) in edited versions with new match commentary replacing the original commentary by Underwood and Sams, and with newly-recorded interviews with RollerGames skaters and personalities conducted by Sean "Hollywood" Hamilton replacing the Rollersports Central and halftime music performance segments.

== Production ==
In 1989, television producers David Sams and Mike Miller teamed with Roller Games owner Bill Griffiths, Sr. to create a modern version of the sport marketed as Rock and RollerGames. Sams provided color commentary while Chuck Underwood provided the main play-by-play.

The show also included halftime entertainment by musical performers like Debbie Harry, Lita Ford, Warrant, Exposé, and had halftime commentary by Wally George. Former Phoenix, Arizona news reporter Shelly Jamison served as sideline reporter. RollerGames premiered in 95% of the country, and, though generally panned by critics, was well received among teenagers and college students.

Director Chet Forte (best known for directing the early days of ABC's Monday Night Football) was recruited to direct the show. Many of the graphics and camera techniques were unique for the day, like the cameras on the skaters. Additional segments were directed by producer David Sams, Joe Dea, and wrestling director Andrew Hecker.

Post Production design and graphic looks were created by lead editor Jonathan Moser and incorporated many state-of-the-art effects (at that time) and technology, as well as utilizing an Amiga computer for special graphic effects.

== Reception ==
In many cities, RollerGames aired late at night, against Saturday Night Live, while in others it aired mid-day on Saturdays. Although the show's ratings were quite good, even beating out American Gladiators, it only lasted one season before getting canceled due to the show's distributor, Qintex, going bankrupt. However, co-producers Motown Productions and Sams/Miller Productions did not go bankrupt due to RollerGames. RollerGames delivered a 4.7 national rating vs. the American Gladiators 2.5 rating. Its debut in New York scored a 9.3 overnight rating.

== Revivals ==
The show paved the way for a revival ten years later with the 1999 premiere of The New TNN's WSL RollerJam, where former RollerGames skaters Richard Brown, Patsy Delgado and Ray Robles skated.

In January 2008, RollerGames coproducer David Sams announced that he "intends to put banked-track Roller Sports back on Television and the Internet in 2008." He later announced that The David Sams Organization was recruiting skaters, coaches, trainers, and cheerleaders for a series that "will be taped in the Los Angeles area, as early as this summer and fall." He also said "A tour is being planned for the winter/spring of 2009." Those plans fell through after a couple of years.

Following the cancellation of RollerGames, Griffiths continued promoting an untelevised league under the name Roller Games International, which continues the sport of RollerGames to this day. The original TV series is now controlled by the producing parties, which retained the rights.

Sams talked about RollerGames and what the future would hold for a revival on an episode of the RollerShoot podcast hosted by Mike Summers and Bob Guercia on Action VR Network which would later spawn plans for the show's return to TV years later.

=== The Return ===
In the summer of 2020, David Sams announced on Facebook that RollerGames was returning to television for the first time in 30 years on Fox Sports 2 every Saturday at 10:00pm Eastern/7:00pm Pacific with replays on Fox Sports 1 every Sunday and FS2 every Monday. Fox Sports and Sams agreed to add the replays to fill the void of lack of live events caused by the COVID-19 pandemic. The replays premiered on FS2 on Saturday, August 1, 2020, but do not feature the original musical performances shown on the original 1989 broadcasts because of music rights issues. They were replaced by Douglas Cooper Getschal's performance of "Rock & RollerGames" (from the later-in-the-season All-Star Game) on every episode except for two episodes featuring performances of "Hit & Run" by Tammy Hanson. (See below) Also, it was Sams' belief that the focus should be on the "athleticism of the skaters." The video from the 1989 series is remastered to air in as high quality for current-day HD displays as much as possible, with graphical elements re-done and the video panned to fill a widescreen 16:9 display. A RollerGames episode marathon was also broadcast on Christmas Day on Fox Sports 1. The newly-revived episodes now also air on YouTube.

== Post-RollerGames ==
Many skaters retired after RollerGames following the series cancellation, but some carried on in other phases of roller derby. As mentioned, Richard Brown, Ray Robles, Patsy Delgado and referee Don Lastra made appearances on the 1999 TNN derby revival RollerJam. Lastra left after two episodes due to injury. Robles and Delgado joined the show in its second season with both starting with the Illinois Riot. Delgado would later join the Florida Sundogs while Robles lost a match race with fellow skater Mark D'Amato and was forced to wear inline skates. Stephanie Garcia would also continue skating into the 2010s before officially retiring and would go on to purchase the original T-Birds franchise not tied to the series. The T-Birds Twins, Kristine and Jennifer Van Gelder are now interior decorators.

== Merchandise ==
- Konami released two different video game versions of RollerGames in 1990 for different platforms: a coin-operated version and a console version for the Nintendo Entertainment System. The arcade version adapts the format of the original TV series, while the NES version is a side-scrolling action game.
- In 1989 the World Alliance of Rollersports released a CD Soundtrack album featuring the show's theme song "Rock & RollerGames", as well as team theme songs "Made In The USA" (T-Birds, sung by Rockers skater Darlene Langlois), "Hit And Run" (Hot Flash, sung by skater Tammy Hansen), "Rock It" (Rockers, sung by Langlois, Hansen and Holly Fields), "Bad Attitude" (Bad Attitude, also sung by Hansen), "Kick Butt" (Violators) and "No Brakes" (Maniacs). The album was produced by Douglas Cooper Getschal, who sang "Rock & RollerGames" and a few other tunes. (The RollerGames music is currently being used on the internet radio program RollerShoot.)
- In 1990 Galoob released seven action figures from show characters.
- In 1990, Williams released a pinball game, Rollergames, designed by pinball designer Steve Ritchie, which features the main theme song recomposed by Dan Forden.
- G.C. London Publishing, the original publisher of Pro Wrestling Illustrated magazine, put out its first and only issue of RollerGames Magazine. A second issue, cover-dated March 1990 and announced in the debut issue to go on sale on January 2, 1990, was never published.
