= I Think I'm Okay =

Single by Machine Gun Kelly, Yungblud and Travis Barker

from the album Hotel Diablo
- Released: June 7, 2019
- Genre: Pop punk; rap rock
- Length: 2:50
- Label: Bad Boy; Interscope
- Songwriters: Colson Baker; Dominic Harrison; Travis Barker; Rory "WYNNE" Andrew; Brandon "SlimXX" Allen; BazeXX; Nick Long; India Rain Quateman
- Producers: Machine Gun Kelly; Travis Barker; Zakk Cervini; WYNNE; SlimXX; BazeXX

Machine Gun Kelly singles chronology
"el Diablo" (2019)	"I Think I'm Okay" (2019)	"Glass House" (2019)

Yungblud singles chronology
"Parents" (2019)	"I Think I'm Okay" (2019)	"Hope for the Underrated Youth" (2019)

Travis Barker singles chronology
"11 Minutes" (2019)	"I Think I'm Okay" (2019)	"3 Years Sober" (2019)

Music video
- "I Think I'm OKAY" on YouTube

"I Think I'm Okay" (stylized as "I Think I'm OKAY") is a song by American musician Machine Gun Kelly, English musician Yungblud, and American musician Travis Barker. It was released as a single on June 7, 2019, from the former's fourth studio album Hotel Diablo.

== Background and release ==
The song was leaked in May 2019. Kelly stated in an interview with Zane Lowe that he was worried about including Barker on the song, in fear that the song might sound more like Barker's music style. According to Kelly, Yungblud freestyled and recorded his verse in 10 minutes.

In the song, Kelly and Yungblud sing about the usage of substances and personal demons, while Barker handles the percussion. On the hook, Kelly criticizes his own reckless lifestyle and dangerous habits.

An acoustic version was released on July 1, 2024, as part of Hotel Diablo's five-anniversary deluxe release entitled “Hotel Diablo: Floor 13 Edition”.

== Music video ==
The music video was released June 14, 2019. Noah Cyrus and FaZe Clan co-owner FaZe Banks made cameos in the video. The video was directed by Andrew Sandler. In under 24 hours, the music video surpassed one million views.

== Charts ==
=== Weekly charts ===
Chart (2019)	Peak position
Australia (ARIA)	59
Belgium (Ultratip Bubbling Under Wallonia)	22
Canada Hot 100 (Billboard)	77
Czech Republic Airplay (ČNS IFPI)	6
Czech Republic Singles Digital (ČNS IFPI)	46
Greece (IFPI)	66
Ireland (IRMA)	56
Lithuania (AGATA)	38
New Zealand Hot Singles (RMNZ)	14
Scottish Singles Sales (Official Charts)	52
Slovakia Singles Digital (ČNS IFPI)	41
Sweden Heatseeker (Sverigetopplistan)	18
UK Singles (Official Charts)	90
US Bubbling Under Hot 100 (Billboard)	4
US Hot Rock & Alternative Songs (Billboard)	3
US Rock & Alternative Airplay (Billboard)	22
US Rolling Stone Top 100	96

=== Year-end charts ===
Chart (2019)	Position
US Hot Rock & Alternative Songs (Billboard)	8
Chart (2020)	Position
US Hot Rock & Alternative Songs (Billboard)	67

== Certifications ==
Region	Certification	Certified units/sales
Australia (ARIA)	Platinum	70,000^{‡}
Brazil (Pro-Música Brasil)	Gold	20,000^{‡}
Canada (Music Canada)	3× Platinum	240,000^{‡}
Denmark (IFPI Danmark)	Gold	45,000^{‡}
Italy (FIMI)	Gold	50,000^{‡}
New Zealand (RMNZ)	Platinum	30,000^{‡}
United Kingdom (BPI)	Platinum	600,000^{‡}
United States (RIAA)	2× Platinum	2,000,000^{‡}
^{‡} Sales+streaming figures based on certification alone.
