= Roller Games =

Sports entertainment spectacle

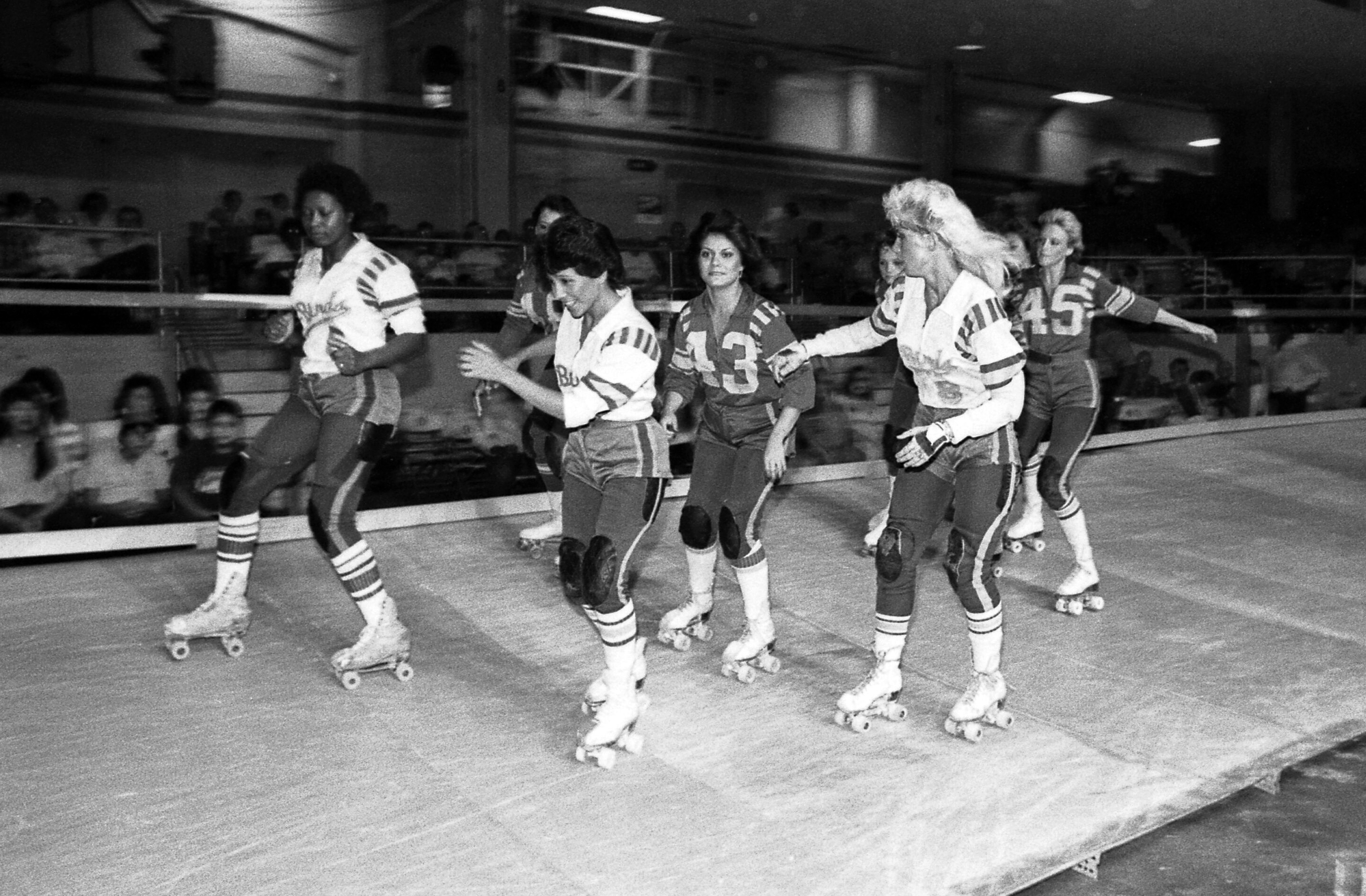
The Los Angeles T-Birds team in 1983

Roller Games was the name of a sports entertainment spectacle created in the early 1960s in Los Angeles, California, as a rival to the Jerry Seltzer-owned Roller Derby league, which had enjoyed a monopoly on the sport of roller derby — and its name — since its inception in 1935. Roller Games provided a mostly televised, increasingly theatrical version of the sport. Roller Games and its flagship team, the Los Angeles Thunderbirds (T-Birds) has endured several boom and bust cycles, including a roller derby attendance record in 1972, a major reorganization in 1975, appearances on ESPN in 1986, a TV series called RollerGames in 1989–1990 (and its corresponding arcade game by Konami and its video game for the Nintendo Entertainment System; there was also a pinball machine based on the show), and a small number of untelevised exhibition matches in 1987, 1988, 1990, 1993, and the early and mid-2000s.

== History ==
=== 1960s and 1970s ===
In 1960, after Roller Derby had settled into its new home in the San Francisco Bay Area, former Roller Derby skater Herb Roberts founded the Los Angeles-based National Skating Derby, Inc., and its flagship Los Angeles Thunderbirds team. The first match was skated in 1961. In late 1961, the company was acquired by Bill Griffiths Sr. and Jerry Hill.

In the 1960s, Roller Games experienced rapid growth, and established teams in Baltimore, Cleveland, Philadelphia, Florida, Hawaii, Canada, Mexico, Australia and Japan. Roller Games eventually encompassed several separate leagues: National Roller Derby (NRD), which was renamed to National Roller League (NRL); Canadian National Roller League (CNRL); and Japanese National Roller League (JNRL). Aside from the L.A. Thunderbirds, NRD/NRL teams over the years included the Chicago Hawks, Detroit Devils, New York Bombers, Texas Outlaws, Philadelphia Warriors, and Brooklyn Red Devils. Many matches were broadcast live on Los Angeles television affiliate KTLA, with Dick Lane calling the play-by-play. He was famous for saying "Whoaaaa, Nelly" (predating Keith Jackson) when fights broke out between the players. Lane's play-by-play was often assisted in the press box and on the infield by Bill "Hoppy" Haupt. The Olympic Auditorium was the league's primary venue. Eventually, the flagship station for Thunderbirds games was changed to KCOP, with taped repeats appearing in prime time on KBSC.

In order to compete with Roller Games' international flair, Seltzer's Roller Derby also formed its own International Roller Derby League (IRDL), which included Roller Derby's most famous teams, the Bay Bombers, Midwest Pioneers, and Jolters, among others.

Some former Roller Derby stars found new fame in the Roller Games, and a handful of skaters simply went back and forth between the two organizations. After 1968, however, the Roller Derby to Roller Games defections were quite few; instead, a handful of Roller Games skaters returned to their roots and began skating for the Derby again.

On September 15, 1972, an interleague match between the Los Angeles Thunderbirds of Roller Games (National Skating Derby) and the Midwest Pioneers of Roller Derby (International Roller Derby League) set a roller derby attendance record of 50,118 at Comiskey Park in Chicago. The final score of the game was Pioneers 82, T-Birds 79.

In 1973, Jerry Seltzer shut down Roller Derby and sold the promotional rights to Bill Griffiths, who immediately disbanded Roller Derby's IRDL and his own NRL, but recruited some of IRDL's star skaters to skate in an NRL successor league, the International Skating Conference (ISC), which was to focus on the Los Angeles Thunderbirds. Teams in the ISC included the L.A. T-Birds, the Eastern Warriors, and several international teams: Team Canada, the Tokyo Bombers, and the Latin Libertadores. The league also featured the San Francisco Bay Bombers in certain games, in which the storylines were built around the Thunderbirds claiming the Bombers were infringing on their territory; the Bombers continued to skate in spite of this. (This incarnation of the Bombers was also unique in that three notable veterans, Ann Calvello, Joan Weston, and Annis Jensen all skated on the same team. Jensen's daughter, Barbara Baker, also skated for the Bombers.)

In 1975, Griffiths shut down Roller Games operations in the face of dwindling popularity, which some attributed to the organization's increasing emphasis on theatrics and entertainment. However, skaters quickly organized a new version of the club, and a new training center opened. Thunderbirds games were locally broadcast on KBSC Channel 52, the Kaiser Broadcasting station for the Los Angeles market, allowing for distribution to other Kaiser stations like San Francisco's KBHK-TV, Chicago's WFLD and Detroit's WKBD. Jerry Hill headed up the Philadelphia-based team, the Warriors, whose games were broadcast on Kaiser-owned WKBS with announcer Elmer Anderson.

The revitalized league prospered in the late 1970s and early 1980s: its home venue, the Olympic Auditorium, was sold out for matches on Saturday nights; games were aired on TV (as Roller Superstars); and skaters "Psycho" Ronnie Rains and Ralphie Valladares became minor celebrities in Los Angeles.

In 1985, the "International Roller Derby League" name was reactivated (although it was still in the Roller Games format), retaining many skaters from Roller Superstars (renamed Championship Roller Derby) and recruiting new skaters. Along with the Los Angeles T-Birds, the other teams were now known as the Northern Devils, Western Outlaws, Golden State Bombers, Hollywood Hawks and Eastern War-Chiefs. Games were skated at the Showboat Sports Pavilion in Las Vegas, with the exception of Eastern War-Chiefs games which were played at the Hartford Civic Center in Hartford, Connecticut. This version of the IRDL was broadcast on ESPN and hosted by Los Angeles radio personality Paul Greenwood with play-by-play analysis by former roller derby skaters Ted Marolf and Jess Adams. Despite having a number of games skated from 1985–1986, the club again fell into decline, with its aging skaters having no place to practice after the closure of the training facility. Griffiths retained the rights to the Roller Games name, however, and organized several matches in 1987 and 1988.

=== RollerGames ===
In 1989, television producers David Sams and Mike Miller worked with Griffiths to produce RollerGames, a U.S. television show that presented an even more theatrical variant of the sport for a national audience. It featured a steeply banked figure-eight track, an alligator pit, and a number of skaters who had been in the Roller Games league, as well as younger participants. It was broadcast for one season (1989–1990) before its distributor, Quintex Media, went bankrupt. The bankruptcy was not related to the popularity of RollerGames. Ratings for the series were actually quite high, even beating the popular American Gladiators.

Sams provided color commentary while Chuck Underwood handled the play-by-play, and was famous for saying "That was absolutely DEV-A-STAT-ING!" Shelley Jamison served as the "on-the-track" commentator while the late Wally George did halftime commentary.

The show aired in reruns on Fox Sports 2 and Fox Sports 1.

=== Roller Games International ===
Following the cancellation of RollerGames, Griffiths organized three untelevised Roller Games International (RGI) events:

- August 8, 1990 in Edmonton, Alberta (Canada)
- August 9, 1990 in Calgary, Alberta (Canada)
- February 6, 1993 in Auburn Hills, Michigan (USA)

All three matches were T-Birds vs. RGI All-Stars.

The organization remained dormant for the rest of the 1990s, although the six teams from RollerGames still performed for the public in the Super Roller Dome with the same rules.

=== 2000s ===
Griffiths' son, Bill Griffiths Jr., relaunched Roller Games International in 2000.

In 2003, former Roller Games skater Lou Sanchez used the T'Birds name in a one-off match, National Roller Derby League.

In 2004, Bob Sedillo purchased the T-Birds name for use in a disastrous exposition match in Phoenix, Arizona against a team of young female skaters associated with the modern revival of the sport.

As of December 2004, the Bob Sedillo-owned Roller Games International (RGI) league still operates a single team, the Los Angeles Thunderbirds (T-Birds). A match between the ARSD's San Francisco Bay Bombers and RGI's Los Angeles Thunderbirds (T-Birds) took place on July 29, 2006 at Kezar Stadium in San Francisco. The Bay Bombers defeated the T-Birds 81-79.

The T-Birds' last home was at the Pomona Fairplex. Several games were skated there in 2007 and 2008. Promotions ceased once trademark owner Bill Griffiths sued Sedillo's Pegasus Media Group. Bob Sedillo died in December 2009.

== See also ==
- RollerGames — the 1989–1990 television show
- RollerJam — the Roller Derby revival TV show (1999–2001)
- Georgia Hase
