= Calvert DeForest =

American comedian; also known as Larry "Bud" Melman

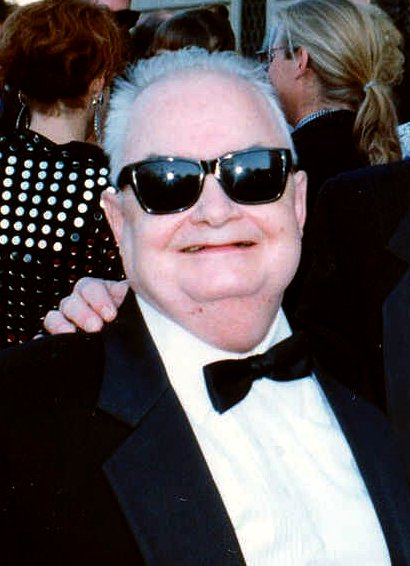
- DeForest in 1990
- Born: Calvert Grant DeForest; July 23, 1921; New York City, U.S.
- Died: March 19, 2007 (aged 85); West Islip, New York, U.S.
- Occupations: Actor, comedian
- Years active: 1972–2002

Calvert Grant DeForest (July 23, 1921 – March 19, 2007), also known by his character name Larry "Bud" Melman, was an American actor and comedian, best known for his appearances on Late Night with David Letterman and Late Show with David Letterman.

== Biography ==
=== Early life ===
DeForest grew up in Bay Ridge, Brooklyn. He was born to Calvert Martin DeForest, M.D., a physician who died in 1930 at the age of 49, and Mabelle (Taylor) DeForest. He claimed that his father was related to radio pioneer Lee de Forest.

DeForest attended Poly Prep Country Day School in Brooklyn, New York. He was employed for many years as a file clerk at the pharmaceutical company Parke-Davis, which was later acquired by Pfizer. He had aspirations of acting but was discouraged by his mother, who was briefly an actress herself. After her death in 1969, DeForest did part-time backstage work, which eventually led to acting work - appearances in five films from 1972 to 1982. He worked part-time as a receptionist at a drug rehabilitation center until February 1984, when his supervisor learned of his employment with NBC. They determined he was ineligible for the position (as he made more than the $6,000 a year to which participants in the program were restricted) and asked him to resign.

=== Work with David Letterman ===
In early 1982, DeForest was hired to appear on the new NBC program Late Night with David Letterman. His late-blossoming television career began with a New York University student film project called King of the Zs, by future Letterman writers Stephen Winer and Karl Tiedemann, who brought him along when they joined the Late Night writing staff. The Associated Press noted: "DeForest's gnomish face was the first to greet viewers when Letterman's NBC show debuted on February 1, 1982, offering a parody of the prologue to the Boris Karloff film Frankenstein. 'It was the greatest thing that had happened in my life,' he once said of his first Letterman appearance."

On Late Night, DeForest played the role of Larry "Bud" Melman. Late Night talent coordinator Sandra Furton described him as a "mascot", but Melman had no real fixed or defined role on the show. He was simply an older, short, portly man with thick black-framed glasses who was seen relatively frequently, especially in the early years. In the first few years of the show, the Melman character was somewhat of an entrepreneur, appearing in ads for "Melman Bus Lines" as well as for "Mr. Larry's Toast On A Stick" ("Bread's answer to the Popsicle!"). He was also ostensibly the producer of the show as the head of "Melman Productions", although this facet of the character was soon dropped. Though the character's nickname was "Bud", he was never addressed or referred to simply as "Bud" -- he would be identified by his full name, or as Mr. Melman, or as Larry Bud, or (rarely) as Larry.

Outside the pre-taped ads, Melman would sometimes be given odd chores to perform by Letterman, such as handing out hot towels to arrivals at the Port Authority Bus Terminal. At other times, Melman would give pre-scripted answers to unlikely audience questions, or appear unexpectedly to heckle Letterman or the audience. Melman also appeared numerous times as "Kenny The Gardener," offering dubious gardening advice to home viewers, followed by a song performed in a tuneless-but-enthusiastic style. Occasionally, Melman would just simply wander onto the stage during Letterman's monologue as if lost, then leave without saying anything.

A hallmark of the Melman character was his seemingly genuine lack of acting polish. Melman's scripted lines were clearly read from cue cards and usually delivered in a forceful shout—but when Letterman or others forced Melman into ad-libbing, the actor's naturally more soft-spoken and polite demeanor came to the forefront. Melman routinely flubbed or mangled lines, but gamely persevered with whatever sketch he was in. He was also noted for his remote interviews in which he would ask the interviewee a question, but pitch the microphone to the interviewee too quickly, resulting in the last part of the question being inaudible to Dave and the audience. As a result of his frequent appearances, he became hugely popular with fans of Late Night, often being greeted with loud cheers and applause before even speaking.

When Letterman moved from NBC to CBS in 1993, the Melman name was retired, as NBC insisted that the character of "Larry 'Bud' Melman" was their intellectual property. However, starting from the first edition of Late Show with David Letterman, DeForest continued to play exactly the same character he had played on Late Night, now simply using his real name. As on Late Night, DeForest was the first person seen on air for The Late Show's premiere episode in August 1993, announcing "This is CBS!" while standing in a cutout of the network logo. DeForest often "drew laughs by his bizarre juxtaposition as a Late Show correspondent at events such as the 1994 Winter Olympics in Norway and the Woodstock anniversary concert that year." One of DeForest's more memorable skits came on Letterman's May 13, 1994 show in Los Angeles. The host stated Johnny Carson would announce the evening's Top 10 list, at which point DeForest appeared as "Johnny Carson." Shortly after DeForest's exit, the real Johnny Carson appeared in what would prove to be Carson's last television appearance.

DeForest continued to appear on Letterman's show until his 81st birthday in 2002 before retiring from acting.

Letterman noted after DeForest's death: "Everyone always wondered if Calvert was an actor playing a character, but in reality he was just himself: a genuine, modest, and nice man. To our staff and to our viewers, he was a beloved and valued part of our show, and we will miss him." When asked how he would like to be remembered, DeForest responded, "Just being able to make people laugh and knowing people enjoyed my humor. I also hope I haven't offended anyone through the years."

=== Other appearances ===
He was co-host (in charge of the digital switcher) on the local SF Bay Area radio program, 10@10, on KFOG with Dave Morey.

In 1985, he appeared in the music video for the Run-DMC song "King of Rock" as a security guard.

In 1989, he appeared in the Special Ed video for the song "Think About It" as the villainous Dr. Norecords.

In 1994, he wrote a humor book called Cheap Advice.

In 1994, he appeared in the music video for the Vince Gill song "What The Cowgirls Do" as a cowboy sidekick.

In 1997, he made a cameo appearance in episode 164 of Wings (16th episode of the 8th season) entitled "Escape from New York".

In the late 1990s, he often appeared in various television ads including ones for Tropicana Twister, 1-800-Collect and Little Caesars.

A lounge compilation CD Calvert DeForest's Erotic Experience was released on October 12, 1999 by Mars Entertainment. DeForest sings on the last track, a cover of "Tequila."

DeForest also appeared on the albums Americana and Ixnay on the Hombre by The Offspring, doing some of the voices that can be heard before and after certain tracks (examples are: “Hand Grenades,” “Change the World,” and “Cocktails”.) In late March 2007, a 20-minute clip of DeForest recording the voices for their album was posted on The Offspring's website.

He appeared at Woodstock '94 to announce Nine Inch Nails' late night set by proclaiming, "Ladies and gentlemen, punch your balls off and please welcome Nine Inch Nails!"

He appeared on the first episode of the 1996 series The Dana Carvey Show on ABC.

He appeared as Rusty in the 1986 episode The Gang's All Here of the television show Pee-wee's Playhouse.

=== Death ===
After years of poor health, DeForest died at Good Samaritan Hospital in West Islip, New York, on Long Island, on March 19, 2007. Per his request, no funeral services were held; he was cremated and his remains were interred at Pinelawn Cemetery, Farmingdale, New York. By all press accounts, he left no surviving relatives.

== Filmography ==
- While the Cat's Away, movie (1972)
- Mrs. Barrington, movie (1974)
- Apple Pie, movie (1976)
- Blond Poison, movie (1979)
- Waitress!, movie (1980)
- Late Night with David Letterman (1982–1993) as "Larry 'Bud' Melman"
- The First Time, movie (1982)
- Nothing Lasts Forever, movie (1984)
- "Cleanin' Up the Town", The BusBoys music video (1984)
- "King of Rock", Run-DMC music video (1985)
- Heaven Help Us, movie (1985)
- Pee-wee's Playhouse, (1986) (Episode 12), as "Rusty"
- My Demon Lover, movie (1987)
- Leader of the Band, movie (1987)
- The Couch Potato Workout, video (1988), as "Larry 'Bud' Melman"
- Freaked, movie (1993), as "Larry 'Bud' Melman"
- Late Show with David Letterman (1993–2002)
- Mr. Write, movie (1994)
- "What The Cowgirls Do", Vince Gill music video (1994)
- Encino Woman, TV movie (1996)
- Wings, cameo, (1997)
- "American Psycho", Misfits music video (1997)
- "Closure", Nine Inch Nails music video (1997)
