= Lindsey Alley =

American actress (born 1977)

- Born: December 6, 1977 (age 48); Lakeland, Florida, U.S.
- Occupations: Actress, singer
- Years active: 1988–present

Lindsey Erin Alley (born December 6, 1977) is an American actress and singer, who for several years lived in New York City and now resides in Los Angeles. She is known for performing on all seven seasons of The All New Mickey Mouse Club (1989-1995).

== Early life ==
Alley was born in Lakeland, Florida.

== Career ==
She began acting at the age of six. In her first starring role, she played the role of Patsy in the movie Ernest Saves Christmas in 1988. From 1989 to 1995, she performed as a Mouseketeer on The Disney Channel's revival of The Mickey Mouse Club (The All New Mickey Mouse Club, also known as MMC), which she remained on until the show was canceled in 1995. Two years after the show ended, Alley graduated from Lakeland Senior High School in 1996. Alley continued her education at the University of Missouri, receiving her Bachelor of Arts in theater with honors in 2000.

Alley also had a brief stint in an on-screen character role of Lisa Seltzer on WSL RollerJam in 2002 from midway through the season to the end of the series.

Alley appeared in her own play, a one-woman show titled Look, Ma...No Ears!, a play on which she collaborated with Robert Stein and Stephen Winer. The play, directed by Ben Rimalower, premiered in April 2006.

Alley appeared in the production of the musical Having It All at the NoHo Arts Center in Los Angeles in 2011, for which she received an Ovation Award nomination for Best Actress in a Leading Role. She reprised the role in the Laguna Playhouse production in March of its 2013 season. In the same year, she appeared on an episode of How I Met Your Mother titled "No Questions Asked".

== Filmography ==
=== Film ===
Year	Title	Role	Notes
1988	Ernest Saves Christmas	Patsy	
2008	Bedtime Stories	Hokey Pokey Woman	
2009	Company Retreat	Dona	

=== Television ===
Year	Title	Role	Notes
1989–1995	The All New Mickey Mouse Club	Self	43 episodes
1990	B.L. Stryker	Marion Martin	Episode: "Night Train"
1993	MMC in Concert	Self	Television special
1997	Sing Me a Story with Belle	Mrs. Woohoo	Episode: "Friends in Books"
1999	RollerJam	Lisa Seltzer	Episode: "Preview of RollerJam Series Special"
2012–2013	On the Patio	—N/a	39 episodes; also writer and producer
2013	How I Met Your Mother	Woman	Episode: "No Questions Asked"
2014	I Didn't Do It	Judy	Episode: "Lindy Nose Best"
2017	Lethal Weapon	Park Ranger	Episode: "Flight Risk"
2018	Liza on Demand	Elizabeth Coburn	Episode: "Simpler Lives"
2019	Jessica Jones	Stage Mom	Episode: "A.K.A Hellcat"
