= Bill Quateman =

American singer-songwriter (born 1947)

- Born: November 4, 1947 (age 78); Chicago, Illinois, U.S.
- Occupation: Singer-songwriter
- Instruments: Vocals, guitar
- Labels: Columbia, RCA Victor, Next of Skin Music, Dreamsville

Bill Quateman (born November 4, 1947, Chicago, Illinois) is an American singer-songwriter. Quateman, signed by Clive Davis at CBS, released four albums in the 1970s and charted with the single "Only Love", which reached No. 86 on the Billboard Hot 100 in 1973. His songs have been covered by musicians including Paul Butterfield, Steve Cropper, Lani Hall, and Dr. John.

Bill's daughter, India Quateman, (known professionally as Naomi Wild), is also a noted singer-songwriter and has collaborated with Machine Gun Kelly and Odesza as she wrote and sang on their breakout hit, "Higher Ground." India (Naomi Wild) toured with Odesza for 3 years and continues to write for them.

== Career ==
Quateman was signed to Columbia Records by Clive Davis and released his self-titled debut album in the early 1970s. The album included Caleb Quaye and Davey Johnstone, who later played with Elton John.

During a dispute with Columbia over his contract that went on for years, Quateman stopped performing. By 1976, he had put together a new band including Chuck Frank on drums and Doug Rodrigues on guitar. He returned to performing, including appearances in the Chicago area and at the University of Illinois Urbana-Champaign. The band played songs from Quateman's Columbia album along with new songs.

== Discography ==
- Bill Quateman (Columbia Records, 1972) U.S. No. 206
- Night After Night (RCA Victor, 1977) U.S. No. 129
- Shot in the Dark (RCA Victor, 1977)
- Just Like You (RCA Victor, 1979)
- The Almost Eve of Everything (Next of Skin Music, 2000)
- Trust with Buzz Feiten (Dreamsville Records, 2002)
