= Stephen Winer =

American writer

Stephen Winer began his writing career at the National Lampoon and his TV career on Late Night with David Letterman which the Writers Guild of America voted one of the 101 Best-Written TV Series. He went on to write for NBC TV's Bloopers & Practical Jokes (Robert Klein segments), two seasons of Robert Klein Time for the USA Network and four seasons of the Disney Channel's The New Mickey Mouse Club where he was nominated for two CableAce Awards.

His other credits include Nick at Nite's Chairman's Choice, starring Dick Van Dyke, and special material for Andy Williams on Happy New Year America for CBS.

As a co-writer/producer, his award-winning film, KING of the Zs, debuted at the Telluride Film Festival and was broadcast on Showtime.

Winer is represented in the theater by Every Comedian Wants to Play Hamlet and Look, Ma...No Ears!.
