= You Talk Too Much (Run-DMC song) =

Single by Run–D.M.C.

from the album King of Rock
- A-side: "You Talk Too Much"
- B-side: "Sucker MC's"; "Darryl and Joe (Krush-Groove 3)"
- Released: 1985
- Recorded: 1984
- Genre: Hip hop
- Length: 5:59
- Label: Profile, 4th & B'way Records
- Songwriters: D. McDaniels, J. Mizel, J. Simmons
- Producers: Larry Smith, Russell Simmons

Run–D.M.C. singles chronology
| "King of Rock" (1985) | "You Talk Too Much" (1985) | "Can You Rock It Like This" (1985) |

Music video
- "You Talk Too Much" on YouTube

"You Talk Too Much" is the third track on Run–D.M.C.'s second studio album, King of Rock. It was released as the second single from the album in 1985. The song was released as a 12" single and the B-side of the UK pressing also featured the tracks "Sucker MC's" (originally from the album Run-D.M.C.) and "Darryl and Joe (Krush-Groove 3)" (also from King of Rock).

== Track listing ==
- 7" – Profile (US) / 4th & B'way Records (UK)
1. "You Talk Too Much" – 3:58
2. "Darryl and Joe (Krush-Groove 3)" – 4:03
- 12" – Profile (US)
1. "You Talk Too Much" – 6:50
2. "Darryl and Joe (Krush-Groove 3)" – 6:30
3. "You Talk Too Much (Instrumental)" – 6:50
4. "Darryl and Joe (Krush-Groove 3) (Instrumental)" – 6:30
- 12" – 4th & B'way Records (UK)
1. "You Talk Too Much (Oral O.D. Mix)" – 6:50
2. "You Talk Too Much (Mute Mix)" – 6:53
3. "Sucker MC's" – 3:07
4. "Daryll and Joe" – 6:25

== Charts ==
| Chart (1985) | Peak position |
|---|---|
| US Billboard Hot Black Singles | 19 |
| US Billboard Dance Music/Club Play Singles | 30^{1} |

Notes:

- ^{1} - Charted with "Darryl and Joe (Krush-Groove 3)"
