= American Roller Derby League =

Roller derby league

The American Roller Derby League (ARDL) is a professional roller derby league formed in the late 1980s. Based in Northern California, the ARDL promotes teams whose names include the Bay City Bombers (the league's primary focus), the Los Angeles Turbos, the New York Demons, the Chicago Pioneers (a.k.a. the Chiefs), and three all-female teams, the East Bay Lady Killers, the SF Roller Girls, and the Orlando Thunder.

The ARDL was featured in the 2006 documentary film Jam, has sponsored novels and a clothing line, and is sometimes promoted as the American Inline Roller Derby League when competing on inline skates.
