= Ralph Valladares =

Guatemalan-American roller derby skater (1936–1998)

Personal information
- Nickname(s): The Guatemalan Flyer; Little Ralphie; The Living Legend
- Nationality: Guatemalan
- Born: July 31, 1936
- Died: November 13, 1998 (aged 62)
- Height: 5 ft 3 in (1.60 m)

Sport
- Sport: Roller derby
- Team: Los Angeles Braves; Miami Westerners; Los Angeles Thunderbirds

Ralph Valladares (July 31, 1936 – November 13, 1998), often known as Ralphie Valladares, was a roller derby skater and coach.

Born in Guatemala, Valladares moved to Los Angeles with his family when he was twelve years old. He hoped to become a jockey, but his weight reached 115 pounds (52 kg), and he turned his attention to roller skating. He joined the roller derby at the age of seventeen, initially skating for the Los Angeles Braves. He soon moved to the Miami Westerners and, despite being the shortest male skater, he immediately became regarded as a star, leading the scoring.

Valladares joined the rival Roller Games on its inception, in 1960, becoming a founder member of the Los Angeles Thunderbirds team. He spent the next thirty years with the organization, and was involved in coaching, and also in setting up events in Japan and Australia. He retired from skating in 1987, but returned for the RollerGames television show.

Valladares kept the same skates through the majority of his career. He noted that he once ran over them with his own car, and they also survived being frozen under 2 feet (0.61 m) of ice, following the evacuation of a venue in which he was competing.

Outside roller derby, Valladares appeared as a shipping clerk in a 1980s television commercial for IBM. He had previous acting experience as a skater in the Kansas City Bomber movie. He married fellow roller derby skater Gloria "Honey" Sanchez twice, on both occasions on March 17. The couple had a daughter, Gina, who also skated with the Roller Games.

Both of Valladares' marriages ended in divorce, although the couple remained close and spent much time together until Valladares' death. He died in 1998 at home in Pico Rivera, California, having suffered with liver cancer for some time.

In 2004, Valladares was posthumously inducted into the Roller Derby Hall of Fame.
