= Shelly Jamison =

American model and news reporter (born 1962)

Shelly Leah Jamison aka Shelly Jamison (born 10 July 1962 (age 64)) is a former television news reporter, and current public official, from Phoenix, who appeared as a Playboy magazine cover model and the sideline reporter on the 1989–1990 souped-up roller derby TV series RollerGames.

Jamison majored in broadcast journalism at Arizona State University. She worked as a news producer, reporter and occasional anchor on KTSP-TV (the current-day KSAZ-TV) in Phoenix, until she appeared clothed on the cover and nude inside the July 1989 issue of Playboy magazine. In the accompanying article, she predicted that she would most likely be fired from KTSP. She rationalized that her pay for the appearance (over US$100,000) was more than five years' pay at the station: she did leave her job at the station after the magazine appearance.

She was hired as a sideline reporter for RollerGames, a syndicated roller derby series aired during the 1989–90 television season, after producers David Sams and Michael Miller saw her picture in a USA Today story about the controversial Playboy appearance.

She joined the Phoenix Fire Department in 1998. She is a member of FEMA's Arizona Task Force One (AZ-TF1) and has deployed to numerous national disaster situations, becoming deputy fire chief. Her broadcasting background has led her to become a department spokesperson. She retired from the role in December 2023. She is married and has a child.
