= Hannie Caulder =

1971 British film by Burt Kennedy

- Theatrical release poster
- Directed by: Burt Kennedy
- Screenplay by: Burt Kennedy; David Haft (as Z.X. Jones)
- Story by: Peter Cooper
- Based on: Characters by Ian Quicke; Bob Richards
- Produced by: Patrick Curtis
- Starring: Raquel Welch; Robert Culp; Ernest Borgnine; Strother Martin; Jack Elam; Christopher Lee; Diana Dors
- Cinematography: Edward Scaife
- Edited by: Jim Connock
- Music by: Ken Thorne
- Production companies: Tigon British Film Productions; Curtwel Productions
- Distributed by: Tigon Pictures
- Release date: November 8, 1971 (London)
- Running time: 85 minutes
- Country: United Kingdom
- Language: English
- Budget: $1 million

Hannie Caulder is a 1971 British Western film directed by Burt Kennedy and starring Raquel Welch, Robert Culp, and Ernest Borgnine.

Kennedy called it a film "which a lot of people hate and a lot of people love. We made it for a million dollars in forty days – and it was pretty good."

== Plot ==
Hannie Caulder is a frontier wife, living with her husband at a horse station between towns in the American West. After a disastrous failed bank robbery raid, the inept Clemens gang, three brothers, arrive at the horse station. After acting friendly, they murder Caulder's husband, gang-rape her, burn down the family house, and leave her for dead in the burning house. The brothers then go on a crime spree, while Caulder recruits bounty hunter Thomas Luther Price to help her get revenge by training her to be a gunfighter. The pair come across a fellow bounty hunter known as The Preacher. After leaving him they travel to Mexico to have gunsmith Bailey build her a specialized revolver, to be a fast draw specialist. In the meantime, the two grow closer. When bandidos surround the Bailey house, a gun battle erupts, but Hannie is unable to kill a man face-to-face. Price recommends she give up her quest for revenge, but she refuses, telling him to get out and that she was only using him and does not need him anymore. Price leaves, telling Hannie she is a bad liar.

As he goes, Price sees the Clemens brothers arrive in town. His attempt to take down Frank for a reward goes awry, because Emmett throws a knife into Price's belly, mortally wounding him. Hannie goes after them, killing Frank in a whorehouse. The two brothers swear revenge on her, but she gets Rufus in a store when he tries to kill her. Hannie lures Emmett to an old prison for a showdown and almost meets the same fate as Price, but Emmett's attempt to throw a knife into her back is thwarted by The Preacher, played by Stephen Boyd, who shoots the knife from his hand. Hannie kills Emmett face-to-face. She realizes that Price was right – taking revenge will change her forever.

== Cast ==
- Raquel Welch as Hannie Caulder
- Robert Culp as Thomas Luther Price
- Ernest Borgnine as Emmett Clemens
- Jack Elam as Frank Clemens
- Strother Martin as Rufus Clemens
- Christopher Lee as Bailey
- Diana Dors as madame
- Stephen Boyd as The Preacher (uncredited)
- Ralph Brown as The Sheriff (uncredited)
- Bud Strait as Jim Caulder, The Husband (uncredited)

== Production ==
Patrick Curtis, then married to Raquel Welch, met with Tony Tenser of Tigon British Film Productions with a view to obtaining funding for a movie starring Welch. Curtis proposed a horror movie or a Western; Tenser, who had always wanted to make a Western, picked that. Tigon put up 100% of the budget, while Curtwel (Curtis and Welch's production company) put up their services. Neither Curtis nor Welch took a salary, instead taking profit participation. Before Hannie Caulder was released, Tigon and Curtwel co-produced The Sorcerers (1967), a horror film starring Boris Karloff. Thus, Curtis and Tenser teamed up for both a Western and a horror film.

The screenplay was rewritten by Kennedy, who was not credited.

It was the third film from Curtwel, following A Swingin' Summer (1965) and The Beloved (1971).

Robert Culp was signed to co-star in December 1970.

The movie was filmed in Spain, mostly around Almería, beginning on January 18, 1971.

Filming started January 1971. Kennedy wrote in his journal " David Haft is the producer of Hannie Caulder. He thinks he’s a writer—what he says goes. I hope he doesn’t say Raquel Welch, because without her, we have no film. Pat Curtis, Raquel’s husband, says he’s the boss, and what he says goes. Wish to hell he’d say David Haft."

Burt Kennedy and the cast were reportedly not paid after the first two weeks of filming, causing tension on the set. Filming resumed.

In June 1971 Kennedy said the producers "cut Hannie Caulder into a mess." He claims he recut it and the film was sold to Paramount within half an hour.

== Release ==
Hannie Caulder opened in London on November 8, 1971.

On September 8, 1971, the British Board of Film Classification announced that the film would receive a AA certificate rating. As of November 1988 a 15 certificate was applied on the video.

== Reception ==
=== Box office ===
The film performed well at the UK box office and was reasonably successful in the United States.

=== Critical response ===
In contemporary reviews, the Monthly Film Bulletin described the film as "a disappointing Western" that was an "uneasy course between parody and imitation in an unlikely amalgam of The Wild Bunch and One Million Years B.C., with the odd nod to Myra Breckinridge." The review noted the lack of dialogue from Welch and that the Clemens brothers in the film are allowed some "rather tedious verbal horseplay".

In 2016 Filmmaker Magazine, saw the film as a "...fascinating bridge between the classical period, represented by John Ford and John Wayne, and the postmodern age of Peckinpah, Corbucci, and Leone. A bouillabaisse of elements that should not work together but do – lyricism, graphic violence, moral contemplation, broad humour, feminist inquiry – it is a masterful hybrid of tried and true Hollywood conventions and the more confrontational style of the Italian Westerns that supplanted American oaters in the mainstream consciousness".

== Legacy ==
Quentin Tarantino said the film was one of his inspirations for Kill Bill. "Why I love Hannie Caulder so much is Robert Culp. He is so magnificent in that movie. I actually think there's a bit of similarity between Pai Mei and the Bride (in Kill Bill: Volume 2)."

Dominique Mainon and James Ursini note in The Modern Amazons: Warrior Women On-Screen that "With Sam Raimi's The Quick and the Dead (1995), producer-star Sharon Stone revisits the domain carved out by Raquel Welch in Hannie Caulder. . . . Like Hannie Caulder before her, as a woman who has taken on the traditional role of a man, she is derided and shunned for that decision."

== Home media ==
The film was released on VHS. In 1995, a LaserDisc was released on a single extended-play disc by Paramount Pictures and distributed by Pioneer Video Manufacturing. It was presented in anamorphic widescreen and a full screen version with no extra features. A DVD was issued in the United Kingdom in 2006 with no extra features. It was reissued in 2010 on anamorphic widescreen with theatrical trailer and stills gallery as extra features. In 2011, Olive Films released the film for the first time on Blu-ray disc in the United States (region A) with no bonus features. It was again released in the U.S. on November 15, 2016, as a digitally restored signature edition Blu-ray with four new bonus features including an audio commentary by Western expert and director Alex Cox, "Exploitation or Redemption?" a 12-minute featurette on the examination of rape-revenge movies with Ben Sher, a 21-minute interview with cultural historian Sir Christopher Frayling on the making of Hannie Caulder, and the history of Tigon Studios titled "Win or Lose" and a 10-page essay titled "Sympathy for Lady Vengeance" by film critic Kim Morgan in digital and booklet form.

== Novelization ==
A novelization of the film was written by author Terry Harknett using the pen name William Terry. The book was published on 1 September 1971 by New English Library.
