= Really, Raquel =

- Written by: Charlotte Brown
- Directed by: Dave Wilson
- Starring: Raquel Welch; The Krofft Puppets; Rich Little (voices); Jane Kean (voices)
- Country of origin: United States

Production
- Producer: Ron Talsky
- Running time: 60 minutes

Original release
- Network: CBS
- Release: March 8, 1974

Really, Raquel was a prime-time variety show adapted from Raquel Welch's 1973 live night club show. The special showcased Welch's talents as a singer, dancer and comedian, pitting her in a variety of skits with the Krofft Puppets, who were the only guest stars. The show aired on CBS on March 8, 1974, and on BBC 2 in London on May 2.

== Production ==
Raquel Welch had struggled to be taken seriously in Hollywood, suffering indignities not only in the tabloids, where her name remained a mainstay for decades but also within the film industry. "The studio did not think I was an actress," she remarked. "And the more they didn't think it, the more I didn't think it. So in my own mind, I had a big question mark about talent, and it used to just eat me up!"

She suffered devastating blows to her reputation with the overlapping productions and releases of the infamous 1970 film Myra Breckinridge, and her surreal TV special, Raquel. With aspirations of starring in a lavish movie-musical, she'd worked hard to develop her voice, but that style of film had fallen out of fashion, so the mod, music video-like TV foray was an attempt to showcase her talents. She was ridiculed and accused of employing a voice double.

Eager to prove the rumors were untrue, she debuted on the Las Vegas stage on the final night of 1972 with the successful cabaret show, Raquel Welch and the World of Sid and Marty Krofft, which drew record audiences and won rave reviews. Although the Krofft brothers received star billing, they were tied up with multiple projects and turned the reins over to members of their crew. Marty joked, "I think she was always bugged that we got all the good reviews and she'd walk by our dressing room and never saw us there." The lounge act toured a few venues, and then Welch produced a TV version. "I could play Vegas three or four times a year, but I'd rather have more people see me all at once on television," she remarked.

The special's title is a passive-aggressive reference to Raquel's previous TV outing. She joked during the monologue that people are carefully watching her lips, and she took an additional jab at critics in the end credits, which state: Miss Welch's voice by Raquel Welch. Some of the stage show's bawdier gags were toned down, including the omission of risqué jokes, and a moment where she flashed her breasts.

The Krofft brothers were not directly involved with the production of the TV special, but it provides a rare glimpse at many of the celebrity marionettes that were staples of their early live performances.

== Program ==
Welch emerges in front of an audience singing Let Me Entertain You from the musical Gypsy. At the song's bridge, she enters a stark stage filled with tuxedo-clad puppeteers in white face paint, who are manipulating elegant Rockette marionettes and rod puppets. As the screen becomes a kaleidoscopic Busby Berkeley puppet dance number, Welch briefly segues into Rose's Turn and the credits roll.

Welch croons a sultry rendition of I'll Be Your Baby Tonight, does a partial striptease, and takes a seat on a distorted piano with a sloped keyboard. The song takes on a Ragtime sound as 12 pairs of gigantic white puppet hands emerge from the strange instrument, pounding on the keys and comically interacting with Miss Welch. The hands vanish as she breaks into a rousing rendition of Jimmy Webb's Cheap Lovin', and then reappear for the song's crescendo and finale. She emerges from the monstrous musical contraption and addresses the audience with a monologue about her life and career, taking swipes at her critics and poking fun at herself. Urging viewers not to believe what they read about her, she slides into a bluesy rendition of Ain't Necessarily So.

Descending upon a giant television camera, Welch announces that it's time for "a medley of my movies." Following the titles from One Million Years B.C., it cuts to Ook the caveman, who's lurking on a stage with sparse shrubbery and enormous film reels. Welch enters wearing a leather bikini astride Oonk-Oonk the dinosaur and sings Barbra Streisand's I Am Woman, You Are Man. She whispers sweet nothings into Ook's ear, which alarms the caveman so much that he flees. Declaring him "too gentle," she professes her love for the dinosaur and leads the beast off stage with his own tongue. The titles for Fantastic Voyage are displayed on the film reels. Dissolve to a large rubbery blob that seems to give birth to Welch, who's clad in a silvery, long-sleeved leotard. As she sensually croons Just Squeeze Me (But Please Don't Tease Me), the blob pulsates and caresses before ultimately enveloping her. Hard cut to the title of Kansas City Bomber as three pairs of rollerskating puppets bumble around the stage. Welch bursts through the backdrop in a shimmery mini-dress, strikes down the skaters, and sings Steamroller Blues. Dissolve to four people clad in musical instrument costumes. Welch emerges in her iconic poster outfit from Myra Breckinridge and performs Saved with the cloth band. Curiously, the title of this film is never shown.

The Krofft's celebrity puppets briefly take the spotlight and perform a symphony. Players include Dracula, Frankenstein's Monster, Pelvis Essley, Carol Channing, Al Jolson, The Marx Brothers, W.C. Fields, The Beatles, Louis Armstrong, The Three Stooges, Alfred Hitchcock, Bing Crosby, Shirley Temple, Charlie Chan, Clark Gable, Phyllis Diller, and others.

Following an introduction from a small, wooden version of legendary nemesis Mae West, Welch belts out a medley from Carole King's Fantasy album, consisting of Fantasy Beginning, You Light Up My Life, Corazón, and Fantasy End. During Corazón, a puppet of Rudolph Valentino dissolves into a flesh-and-blood man who joins Welch and another Valentino lookalike for a frantic dance number.

Solo in a pink evening gown, Welch performs an intimate version of Born a Woman followed by a bouncy rendition of I'm a Woman. As the song concluded in the live act, Raquel did a striptease, exposing her pasties, and the lights went out. In the TV special, she seductively peels the dress open with her back to the audience as she exits the stage.

Welch returns in one final gown, says goodnight, and the credits roll.

== Reception ==
Reviews were generally positive. In a backhanded compliment, People Magazine declared it was " a quantum advance over the debacle of her 1970 TV debut." The Lowell Sun proclaimed, "Raquel Welch turns in an exceptionally fine display of talent." The San Francisco Examiner remarked, "The show tended to drag when our heroine reminisced about her career, but otherwise it was a first rate, bouncy, lively hour, worthy of the fetching wench that Raquel Welch is." Conversely, John J. O'Connor of The New York Times complained, "She slinks, she purrs, she bumps, she grinds, but it all comes out looking like a bad imitation of Rita Hayworth in Cover Girl."

== Availability ==
The special was once rumored to have been lost, but in 2018, archival company Obsolete Video Services unearthed a rare recording of the broadcast on Los Angeles's KNXT.
