= Date My Dad =

Canadian-American TV series

- Genre: Comedy drama
- Created by: Nina Colman
- Starring: Barry Watson; Zenia Marshall; Lilah Fitzgerald; Audrey Smallman; Raquel Welch
- Countries of origin: Canada; United States
- Original language: English
- No. of seasons: 1
- No. of episodes: 10

Production
- Executive producers: Tom Mazza; Dan Angel; David McLean; Brenda McLean; Sacha R.F. McLean; Jason McLean
- Production locations: Vancouver, British Columbia, Canada

Original release
- Network: W Network (Canada); Up TV (United States)
- Release: June 2 – July 28, 2017

Date My Dad is a Canadian-American comedy-drama television series starring Barry Watson as a single father raising three daughters. It was broadcast on Up TV in the United States from June 2 to July 28, 2017, and aired on the W Network in Canada.

== Premise ==
The show is about Ricky Cooper, a former professional baseball player, who, years after the death of his wife Isabella, begins dating for the first time in twenty years, in addition to raising his three daughters: Mirabel, Elisa, and Gigi.

== Cast ==
- Barry Watson as Ricky Cooper
- Zenia Marshall as Mirabel, Ricky's oldest daughter
- Lilah Fitzgerald as Elisa, Ricky's middle daughter
- Audrey Smallman as Gigi, Ricky's youngest daughter
- Raquel Welch as Rosa, Ricky's mother-in-law

== Production ==
Filming began in Vancouver, British Columbia, Canada on April 12, 2017.

== Episodes ==
No.	Title	Directed by	Written by	Original release date	Viewers (millions)
1	"Pilot"	Jonathan A. Rosenbaum	Nina Colman	June 2, 2017	N/A
Ricky's mother-in-law moves out on his 40th birthday and his three daughters try to find him a date by opening a lawn-front dating service in the series premiere of this comedy about a widowed father being pushed back into the dating game.
2	"But I Really Like the Kids"	Monika Mitchell, Mike Rohl, Johnathan A. Rosenbaum, Michael Scott	Nina Colman	June 2, 2017	N/A
Ricky starts seeing Katie, a woman with three sons, and he enjoys playing baseball with her boys more than spending time with her on dates. Meanwhile, Gigi tries out for the lead in the school play.
3	"Sacrifice Fly"	Monika Mitchell, Mike Rohl, Johnathan A. Rosenbaum, Michael Scott	Nina Colman, Melissa Rundle	June 9, 2017	N/A
Ricky must do the shopping for the entire house for the first time when cleaning supplies and groceries become scarce. Meanwhile, Elisa tries to balance schoolwork and housework.
4	"Appearances"	Monika Mitchell	Melody Fox	June 16, 2017	N/A
The girls decide It's time to give Ricky a complete lifestyle makeover and even hire the perfect girlfriend for him - behind his back.; Mirabel discovers she's more than just a pretty face by treating the school nerd with respect.
5	"The Outfit"	Monika Mitchell	Nina Colman, Tom Nursall	June 23, 2017	N/A
Mirabel gets her sisters rethinking their wardrobes when she's stopped by Ricky trying to leave the house wearing an inappropriate outfit; Ricky's brother and sister-in-law ambush him with a double date.
6	"Bingo!"	Mike Rohl	Rick Marin	June 30, 2017	N/A
Rosa notices that the Cooper family is absent of their Mexican heritage and teaches them all to Salsa at her senior's bingo night; Gigi struggles to hide her intelligence so she can fit in with friends at her school.
7	"Think Before You Type"	Monika Mitchell, Mike Rohl, Jonathan A. Rosenbaum	Nina Colman, Melissa Rundle	July 7, 2017	N/A
When a boy starts to admire Elisa, the popular girl makes her the laughing stock of the 6th grade; Mirabel quickly understands the downsides of being an Instagram celebrity and Rosa finds her calling as the elementary school's counselor.
8	"Moving On"	Monika Mitchell, Mike Rohl, Jonathan A. Rosenbaum, Michael Scott	Nina Colman, Melody Fox	July 14, 2017	N/A
Ricky falls for Stephanie's friend which ignites jealousy in Stephanie; Gigi feels left out.
9	"Family Memories"	Monika Mitchell, Mike Rohl, Jonathan A. Rosenbaum, Michael Scott	Nina Colman, Melody Fox, Melissa Rundle	July 21, 2017	N/A
The Cooper clan takes a camping trip to revisit the old cabin they used to frequent with Ricky's late wife and the girl's mother, Isabella; Ricky helps Mirabel come to terms with her memories of her mother.
10	"Graduation"	Monika Mitchell, Mike Rohl, Jonathan A. Rosenbaum	Nina Colman, Rick Marin	July 28, 2017	N/A
At Elisa's graduation, Ricky comforts Elisa in her sadness at her mother's absence and first big step into womanhood as she starts her period; Kim counsels Gigi in her concern about eventually having to decide between her career and having children.
