= Helena Kallianiotes =

Greek-American film actress (born 1938)

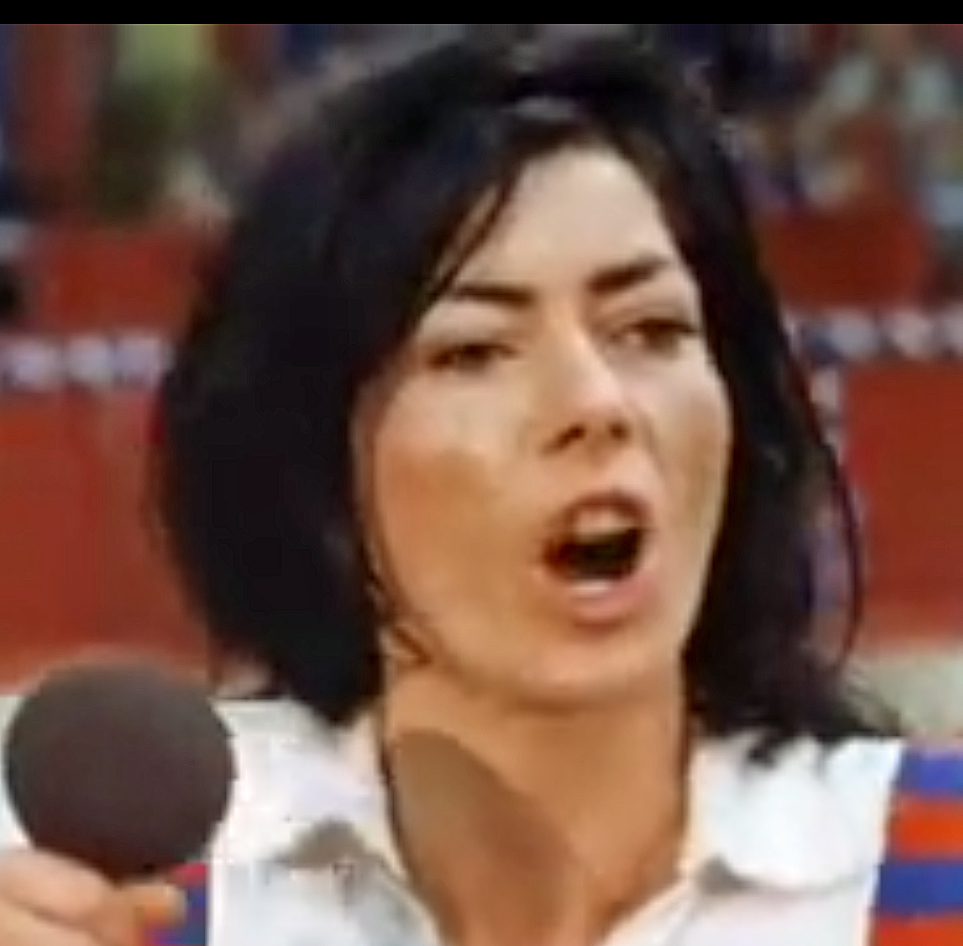
- Helena Kallianiotes in the trailer for Kansas City Bomber (1972)
- Born: March 24, 1938 (age 88); Megalopolis, Greece
- Occupations: dancer; actress; nightclub owner
- Years active: 1968–2017
- Known for: Kansas City Bomber; Shanks; Five Easy Pieces; The Drowning Pool
- Spouses: Iordanis Tsomidis (m. 1961; div. 1964) Billy Gray (m. 1967; div. 1969)

Helena Kallianiotes (born March 24, 1938) is a Greek-born American film actress. In 1973, she was nominated for the Golden Globe Award for Best Supporting Actress – Motion Picture for her role as Jackie Burdette in Kansas City Bomber.

== Career overview ==
"Helena’s dancing so overwhelmed me with awe and happiness that when I heard later that she was at a place on Hollywood Boulevard called the Greek Village, I dragged every date there and made him pay clip-joint prices so I could see the girl move." - Eve Babitz

During the late 1960s, Helena Kallianiotes was the resident belly dancer at The Intersection, a Middle Eastern Greek and Balkan members-only international folk dance club at 2735 West Temple Street and North Lafayette Park Place in Los Angeles, California. This engagement led to her first film appearance as an uncredited belly dancer in the 1968 film Head, directed by Bob Rafelson and starring The Monkees. Two years later, Kallianiotes was cast in another Rafelson film, Five Easy Pieces, starring Jack Nicholson and Karen Black. She played Palm Apodaca, a neurotic, cleanliness-obsessed lesbian hitch-hiker, traveling with her companion (played by Toni Basil).

In 1972, Kallianiotes appeared in her most celebrated role as the ultra-aggressive roller derby skater Jackie Burdette in Kansas City Bomber, for which she received a Best Supporting Actress nomination for the 1973 Golden Globe Awards. Her other film roles include Mata Hari in Shanks (1974), Elaine Reavis in The Drowning Pool (1975), Anita in Stay Hungry, the Visionary Woman in The Passover Plot (both 1976), and a future-reading brothel madam in Nicolas Roeg's Eureka (1983).

== Life outside of film ==
In 1975, Kallianiotes appeared on the cover of Art Garfunkel's album, Breakaway.

In 1978, for about four years, Kallianiotes hosted a Monday roller-skating club night, in Sherman Square Roller Rink, Skataway, after holding a birthday party, at the corner of Reseda Boulevard and Sherman Way, with jackets by Richard Tyler for Cher, Ed Begley Jr., Allegra Huston, Marlon Brando, Jack Nicholson, and others.

From 1985 to 1991, she operated Helena's, a private members-only club at 2735 West Temple Street and North Lafayette Park Place in Los Angeles, across from LAPD Rampart Division station. From 1967 to 1984, the location was formerly The Intersection, a folk dance coffeehouse, similar to Intersection for the Arts.

== Filmography ==
=== Film ===
Year	Title	Role	Notes
1968	Head	Belly Dancer	Uncredited
1969	Easy Rider	Woman in Commune	Uncredited
1970	Five Easy Pieces	Palm Apodaca	Was featured in the famous "chicken salad sandwich" scene with Jack Nicholson, Karen Black and Toni Basil.
1970	The Baby Maker	Wanda	
1972	Kansas City Bomber	Jackie Burdette	Nominated for 1973 Golden Globe Award for "Best Performance by an Actress In A Supporting Role."
1974	Shanks	Mata Hari	A moll in a biker gang, all of whom use names of historical persons (Einstein, Napoleon, Goliath)
1975	The Drowning Pool	Elaine Reavis	
1976	Stay Hungry	Anita	
1976	The Passover Plot	Visionary Woman	
1978	Renaldo and Clara	herself	
1983	Eureka	Frieda	
1990	Catchfire	Grace Carelli	

=== Television ===
Year	Title	Role	Notes
1979	CHiPs	Lita	Episode: "Roller Disco: Part 1"; Episode: "Roller Disco: Part 2"
1984	Faerie Tale Theatre	Gina (as Helena Kallioniotes)	Episode: "Pinocchio"
1985	Alfred Hitchock Presents	Maria Kyprianov (segment "An Unlocked Window")	Episode: "Pilot"
2017	Star	Maggie	Episode: "The Devil You Know"; Episode: "Alibi"

== Awards and nominations ==
Year	Award	Category	Production	Result
1973	30th Golden Globe Awards	Golden Globe Award for Best Supporting Actress - Motion Picture	Kansas City Bomber	Nominated
