= Patrick Curtis (producer) =

American film producer (1939–2022)

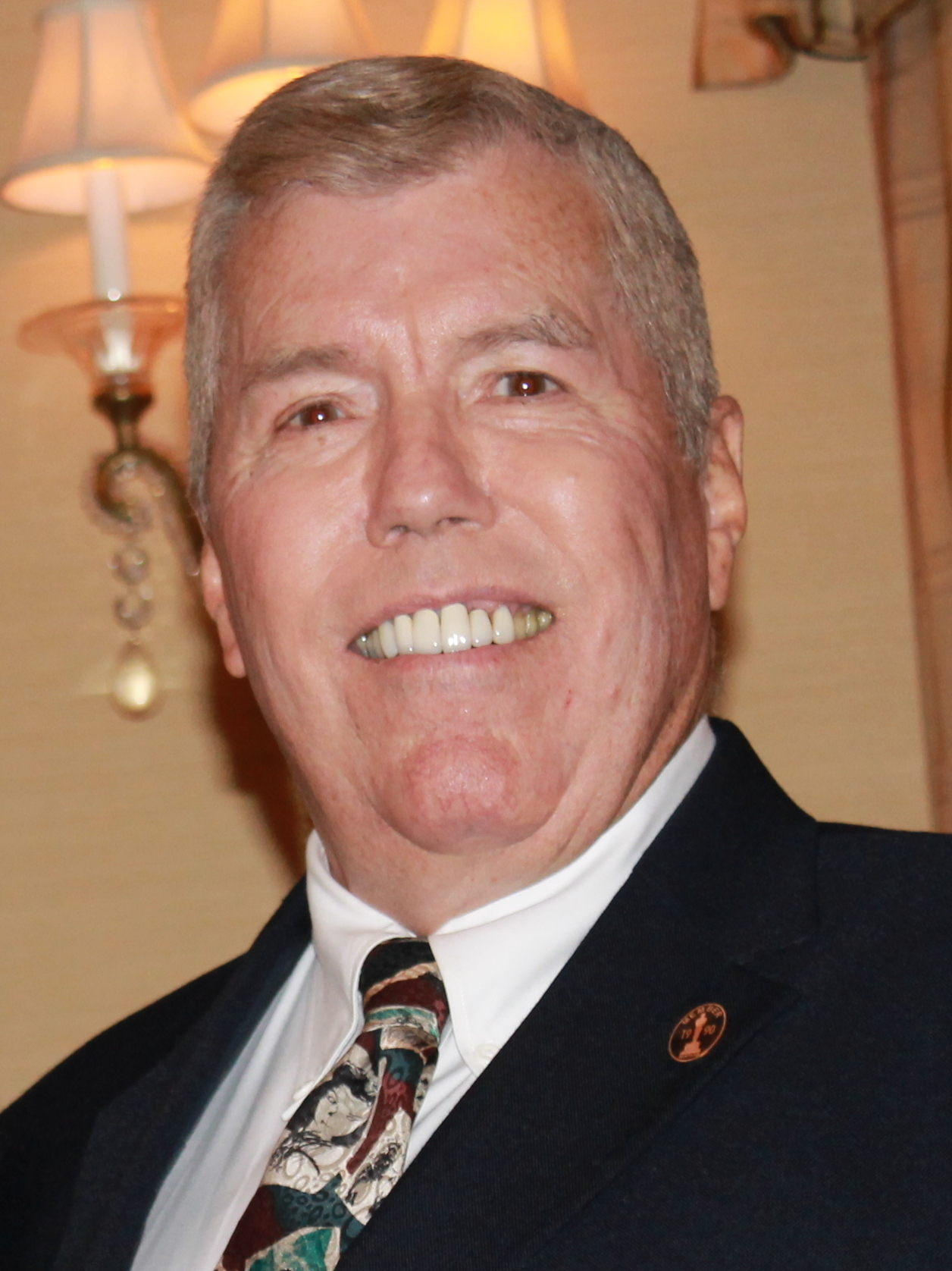
- Curtis in 2013
- Born: Patrick Anthony Smith; June 15, 1939; Los Angeles, California, U.S.
- Died: November 24, 2022 (aged 83); St. George, Utah, U.S.
- Occupation: Film producer
- Years active: 1965–2012
- Spouses: Raquel Welch (m. 1967; div. 1972); Margolyn Johnson (m. 1975; div. 1979); Annabel Little (m. 1988)
- Partner: Linda Evans (1960–1962)
- Family: Billy Wilder (uncle)

Patrick Anthony Smith (June 15, 1939 – November 24, 2022), known as Patrick Curtis, was an American film producer, best known for his association with Raquel Welch, whom he married on February 14, 1967 and divorced on January 6, 1972. Curtis was instrumental in promoting Welch's career. He produced a number of films starring her.

Curtis was cast in the uncredited part of Baby Beau Wilkes in Gone with the Wind in 1939. His uncle was film director Billy Wilder.

Curtis was a stand-in for Tony Dow ("Wally") on the series "Leave it to Beaver" and appeared as an extra in a few episodes. His acting career never took off.

Curtis died on November 24, 2022, at the age of 83. His Gone with the Wind co-star, Mickey Kuhn, had died four days prior to him.

== Select credits ==
- A Swingin' Summer (1965) – associate producer
- The Sorcerers (1967) – producer
- The Beloved (1970) – producer
- Raquel! (1970) (TV special) – producer
- Hannie Caulder (1971) – producer
- J-Men Forever (1975) – producer
- The Avenging Angel (1995) – producer
- Meanwhile, Back at the Ranch (2012) – producer

=== Unmade projects ===
- O'Hooligan's Mob (1971) – to direct
