= Kansas City Bomber =

1972 film directed by Jerrold Freedman

- Theatrical release poster
- Directed by: Jerrold Freedman
- Screenplay by: Calvin Clements Sr. Thomas Rickman
- Story by: Barry Sandler
- Produced by: Martin Elfand
- Starring: Raquel Welch; Kevin McCarthy
- Cinematography: Fred J. Koenekamp
- Edited by: David Berlatsky
- Music by: Don Ellis
- Production companies: Levy-Gardner-Laven; Raquel Welch Productions; Artists Entertainment Complex
- Distributed by: Metro-Goldwyn-Mayer
- Release date: August 2, 1972
- Running time: 99 minutes
- Country: United States
- Language: English

Kansas City Bomber is a 1972 American sports drama film released by Metro-Goldwyn-Mayer, directed by Jerrold Freedman and starring Raquel Welch, Kevin McCarthy and an eight year old Jodie Foster in her second feature film appearance.

== Plot ==
The film is an inside look at the world of Roller Games, then a popular league sport-entertainment, a more theatrical version of roller derby.

K.C. Carr, who has just left her former team in Kansas City, Missouri, starts her life as a single mother over again in Portland, Oregon with a team called the Portland Loggers. Loggers' owner Burt Henry is clearly interested in her, and he and K.C. date. Henry has a rather ruthless side to him: he trades away K.C.'s best friend and roommate on the team Lovey, and when he sees that star male skater "Horrible" Hank Hopkins is interested in her, he manipulates the audience into booing Hopkins, causing him to go crazy and lose his job. Henry's endgame is to set up a match race between K.C. and her teammate and rival Jackie Burdette, with K.C. deliberately losing so that she can join Henry at a new team he's setting up in Chicago. However, K.C. no longer trusts Henry (or his promises to let her bring her children along, a son and daughter) and wins the match race.

== Cast ==
- Raquel Welch as K.C. Carr
- Kevin McCarthy as Burt Henry
- Helena Kallianiotes as Jackie Burdette
- Norman Alden as "Horrible" Hank Hopkins
- Jeanne Cooper as Vivien
- Mary Kay Pass as Lovey
- Martine Bartlett as Mrs. Carr
- Cornelia Sharpe as Tammy O'Brien
- William Gray Espy as Randy
- Richard Lane as Len
- Russ Marin as Dick Wicks
- Stephen Manley as Walt Carr
- Jodie Foster as Rita Carr
- Georgia Schmidt as Old Woman
- Shelly Novack as Ben
- Jim Nickerson as Fan
- Bill McKinney as Buddy Taylor (uncredited)

== Production ==
=== Development ===
The film was written by Barry Sandler as a UCLA MA Thesis, with Raquel Welch in mind for the lead. "Raquel was a huge star at the time--kind of like the pop culture goddess", recalled Sandler. "I just thought it would be great to see her as a roller derby queen; it seemed like a perfect meshing of pop culture with that role."

Although Sandler and Welch shared the same agent, ICM, he was a very new screenwriter and was unsure if the script would actually get read. He delivered a copy personally to the house Welch then shared with her husband and manager, Patrick Curtis. Curtis bought the script in March 1971 for their production company, Curtwel Productions. "She was a huge star at the time, and that meant if she wanted to do it, the movie would get made", said Sandler.

"I believe that he had me in mind when he wrote it", said Welch. "The girl is more than a little bitchy."

Sandler says the original script was very different from what the movie became:

[It was] a dark, gritty, character piece, more in the vein of Requiem for a Heavyweight. It's about this young woman from Kansas City who goes out to Hollywood dreaming of fame and fortune, making it in the movies, and she's really not good enough to do so, but she's desperate to make her name and to get attention. She struggles and struggles, and never makes it, and then one day, she meets this kind of beat up, bruised up, burnt-out ex roller derby queen who kind of takes her under her wing and coaches her, and tries to get her involved in the roller derby. It sort of shows her becoming a roller derby star, and the irony is that she makes it in the roller derby, but as a black-trophy ... as a bad girl who gets hissed at, beat up, and spit on every week. The irony is that she is able to find the stardom she desperately yearned for, but not as a movie star--as a star on the roller derby track getting booed at and spit at every week. And so it's kind of dark, and much grittier and different, kind of almost along the lines of Midnight Cowboy.

The film was originally going to be made for Warner Bros., then for United Artists. Eventually Welch divorced Curtis and made the film for her own company in association with Artists Entertainment Complex and Levy-Gardner-Laven. The film was part-financed and distributed by Metro-Goldwyn-Mayer, whose president, James T. Aubrey, was romantically linked with Welch for a time.

Over the course of moving from studio to studio, the script was heavily rewritten. Sandler later said if the film had been made at Warner Bros, "they would have stuck to" the original conception:

Warner Brothers was a much more adventurous studio at the time. They were making The Devils and A Clockwork Orange, Performance ... they stuck with those kinds of movies. ... MGM wanted to sell Raquel Welch in a tight roller derby jersey, running around the track. Listen, they weren't stupid, they were smart to do that. It certainly made them a lot of money, and it would have been a much riskier project to go the other way. They weren't sure whether Raquel could pull it off. I think she could have, but they wanted to play it much safer and go with a much more straight-on roller derby story. So, the film was made like that, and I think it's pretty good, but it's a different kind of movie than the version I envisioned.

Raquel Welch discussed her character in detail to the press:

The motivation of the character I play is simply to make a buck in life and to attain a sense of identity. There's a futility in what she does. The shape of the track is her life, round and round, going nowhere. But the pros, the real skaters who worked with me, they were terrific. Most of them suffer from the same image I do. They're on skates, they're padded up, they're on a raised track. Most people tend to think of these girls as Amazons. But most of them are even smaller than me. They're not as muscular or as butch as you'd expect. I have a similar problem. Most people are disappointed if the door hinges don't shatter off when I walk into a room.

"It's all set up, as everyone knows", said Welch of skating. "It's too bad it couldn't be a more legitimate sport. The skaters have great athletic ability. I'm not much of an athlete ... For the film I had to learn to skate again. I hadn't skated since I was seven."

=== Filming ===
Filming was to have started in February 1972. Welch practiced skating for several months, training with pro teams, wearing a wig and dark glasses and posing as a journalist looking into a story. In January, a rink was constructed on an MGM soundstage, enabling Welch to practice daily. She broke her right wrist during a speed skating session, forcing shooting to be postponed eight weeks until April.

Filming of Kansas City Bomber took place in Portland, Oregon. Two weeks into the shoot Welch suffered a cut lip and swollen face during a fight scene with co-star Helena Kallianiotes. An MGM spokesman said the two actors "got carried away" and Welch "got slugged". Welch later said she also bruised her knees, got a spasm in her trapezius, had some hematomas on her head, and suffered several headaches.

The film used real-life stars of the National Skating Derby, Roller Games, as uncredited extras, such as Patti Cavin (as "Big Bertha" Bogliani), Judy Arnold (who was a skating stunt double for Raquel Welch's character), Ralph Valladares, Ronnie Rains, Judy Sowinski, Richard Brown, Tonette Kadrmas and John Hall. Real roller derby venues in Kansas City, Fresno, and Portland were also used for key scenes.

"The film was fun", said Welch. "I like to be in physical pictures. And the Roller Games is a microcosm of this country, the kind of thing we create."

She elaborated:

The game is almost show business, it's a carnival atmosphere, but I can understand its popularity. Most of the spectators are basic people and there's something cathartic about watching people get dumped. The yelling creates a certain kind of intensity. The type of violence draws you in, makes you involved. The skaters are tough but I think all women are tough. The skaters aren't any tougher than most of the women in the world, underneath. Skating is a batchy, sweaty, funky life. I don't want to do another film about it. I've done my number. But I enjoyed it.

Welch later said this was the first of her films that she actually liked.

== Soundtrack ==
Folk singer and songwriter Phil Ochs wrote a song of the same title; he had intended it as the title song for the film, but it was rejected by Metro-Goldwyn-Mayer. Ochs had A&M Records issue the song as a single anyway. He hoped to publicly debut the song at the Los Angeles Thunderbirds' track during a Roller Games television taping at Los Angeles' Olympic Auditorium, as many of the Thunderbirds skaters had appeared in the movie as extras and announcer Dick Lane had a small speaking role. However, Thunderbirds owner Bill Griffiths Sr. likewise rejected that idea. Don Ellis contributed the score of the film.

== Reception ==
=== Box office ===
Kansas City Bomber was one of MGM's most successful releases of 1972, along with Shaft and Skyjacked. The success of the film caused the share price of Artist Entertainment Complex to rise. Barry Sandler says the film was profitable and proved lucrative for him.

=== Critical response ===
Roger Greenspun of The New York Times wrote that:

Jerrold Freedman has directed Kansas City Bomber with an eye to hard-hitting action and gutsy detail. But I don't think his eye is really sharp enough or fast enough or even wide enough open. His roller-games scenes seem authentic but rather unexciting; and his major stylistic contribution is to indulge a penchant for zooming his camera back, leaving characters trapped behind windows in pretentious and often ludicrous dramatic isolation. ... The film's one incredible performance comes from Helena Kailianiotes, as Jackie Burdette. Slouching sullenly in doorways, staring moodily into space, cadging booze from a bottle hidden in a skating boot, she goes to the dogs with an inappropriate passion rich enough to suggest an over-the-hill Sarah Bernhardt being traded off to the minors by the Comédie Française.

Arthur Murphy of Variety wrote, "Raquel Welch stars in one of her most effective roles to date. Rugged, brawling action will more than satisfy those who enjoy that type of commercial carnage, while the script explores deftly the cynical manipulation of players and audiences."

Gene Siskel of the Chicago Tribune gave the film 3 stars out of 4 and thought it was "more than good fun. It's a gas."

Kevin Thomas of the Los Angeles Times thought Welch "comes through with a characterization as unexpected as it is persuasive" and said the film "is a well observed slice of contemporary Americana" which "marks Raquel Welch's coming of age as an actress and is a personal triumph for her after surviving more rotten movies than anyone would care to remember."

Tom Milne of The Monthly Film Bulletin wrote that for "a few minutes" the film was "fast, furious and funny", until the "dismally scripted" film turned serious.

Joyce Haber called it one of the worst films of 1972.

== Awards and honors ==
Helena Kallianiotes was nominated for a Golden Globe Award for Best Supporting Actress – Motion Picture at the 30th Golden Globe Awards.

== Legacy ==
The film was heavily publicized during filming. This inspired Roger Corman to finance an exploitation film set in the world of roller derbies, Unholy Rollers. Welch sent up the film as part of her Las Vegas act in late 1972.

Welch later said she was "good" in the film just as she was good in Myra Breckinridge (1970) and The Last of Sheila (1973), "but being good in a bad film doesn't do anything for your career." In 1978, she said the film was one of the few in her career with which she was happy, the others being L'Animal and The Three Musketeers.

After being featured in the film, the World Famous Kenton Club in Portland, Oregon had its "world famous" tagline subsequently added to its title and features memorabilia from the film.

== See also ==
- List of American films of 1972
