= Raquel Welch =

American actress and model (1940–2023)

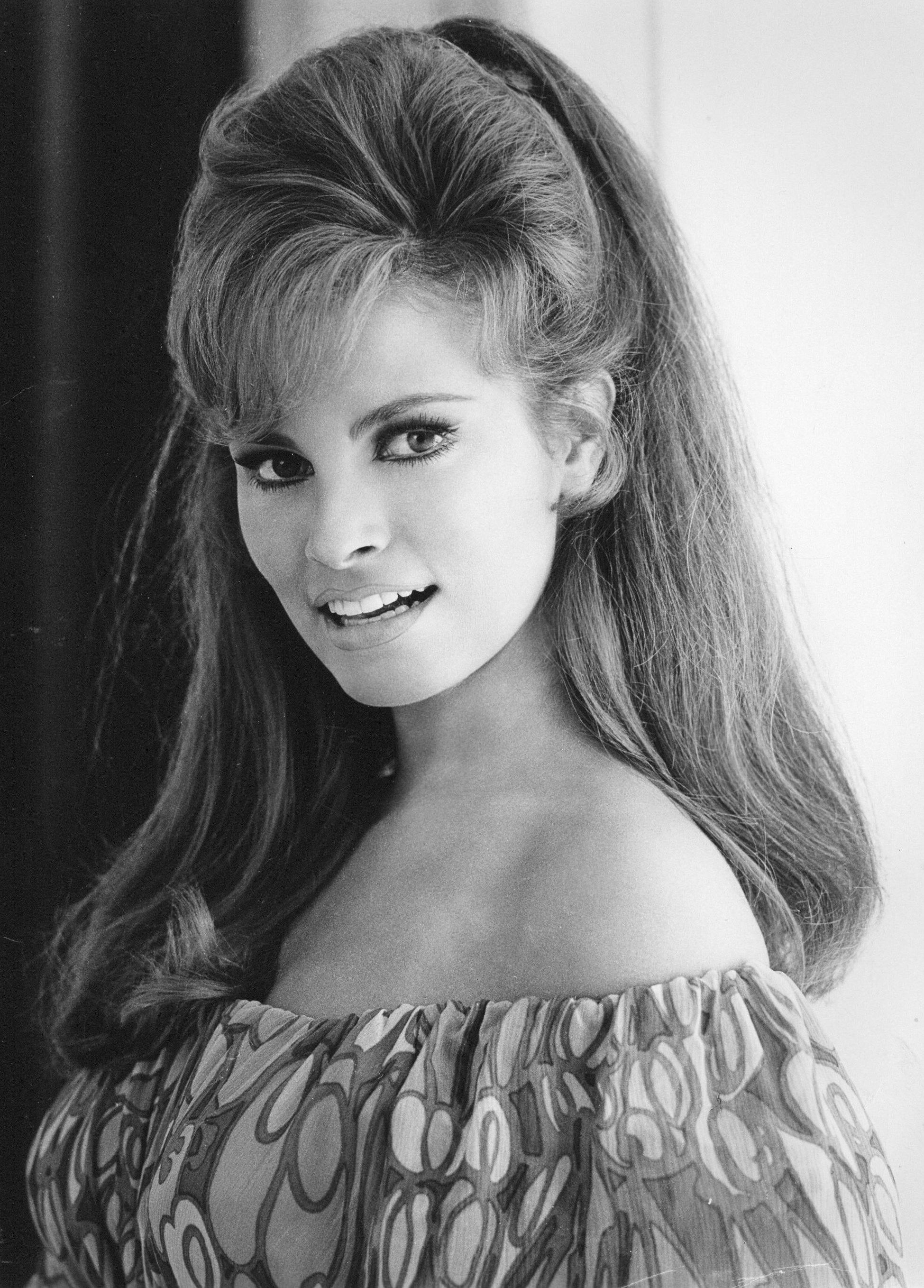
- Welch in 1967
- Born: Jo Raquel Tejada; September 5, 1940; Chicago, Illinois, U.S.
- Died: February 15, 2023 (aged 82); Los Angeles, California, U.S.
- Occupations: Actress; model
- Years active: 1964–2017
- Spouses: James Welch (m. 1959; div. 1964) Patrick Curtis (m. 1967; div. 1972) André Weinfeld (m. 1980; div. 1990) Richie Palmer (m. 1999; div. 2004)
- Children: 2, including Tahnee

Jo Raquel Welch (née Tejada; September 5, 1940 – February 15, 2023) was an American actress. Welch first gained attention for her role in Fantastic Voyage (1966), after which she signed a long-term contract with 20th Century Fox. They lent her contract to the British studio Hammer Film Productions, for whom she made One Million Years B.C. (1966). Although Welch had only three lines of dialogue in the film, images of her in a doe-skin bikini became bestselling posters that turned her into an international sex symbol. She later starred in Bedazzled (1967), Bandolero! (1968), 100 Rifles (1969), Myra Breckinridge (1970), Hannie Caulder (1971), Kansas City Bomber (1972), The Last of Sheila (1973), The Three Musketeers (1973), The Wild Party (1975), and Mother, Jugs & Speed (1976). She made several television variety specials.

Through her portrayal of strong female characters, helping her break the mold of the traditional sex symbol, Welch developed a unique film persona that made her an icon of the 1960s and 1970s. Her rise to stardom in the mid-1960s was partly credited with ending Hollywood's vigorous promotion of the blonde bombshell. She won a Golden Globe Award for Best Motion Picture Actress in a Musical or Comedy in 1974 for her performance as Constance Bonacieux in The Three Musketeers and reprised the role in its sequel the following year. She was also nominated for a Golden Globe Award for Best Actress in Television Film for her performance in Right to Die (1987). Her final film was How to Be a Latin Lover (2017). In 1995, Welch was chosen by Empire magazine as one of the "100 Sexiest Stars in Film History". Playboy ranked Welch No. 3 on their "100 Sexiest Stars of the Twentieth Century" list.

== Early life ==
Welch was born Jo Raquel Tejada in Chicago, Illinois, and moved to San Diego, California, at age two with her family. She was the first child of Josephine Sarah Hall and Armando Carlos Tejada Urquizo. Her mother was of English descent with ancestors tracing back to the Mayflower. Her father was an aeronautical engineer from La Paz, Bolivia, of Spanish descent. Her cousin, Bolivian politician Lidia Gueiler Tejada, became the first female president of Bolivia and the second female non-royal head of state in the Americas. Welch had a younger brother and a younger sister.

Welch was raised in the Presbyterian denomination and attended Pacific Beach Presbyterian Church every Sunday with her family. As a young girl, Welch had the desire to be a performer and entertainer. She began studying ballet at age seven, but after ten years of study, she left the art at seventeen when her instructor told her she did not have the right body type for professional ballet companies. At age 14, she won beauty titles as Miss Photogenic and Miss Contour. While attending La Jolla High School she won the title of Miss La Jolla and the title of Miss San Diego – the Fairest of the Fair – at the San Diego County Fair. This long line of beauty contests eventually led to the state title of Maid of California. Her parents divorced when she finished school.

Welch graduated with honors from high school in 1958. Seeking an acting career, she entered San Diego State College on a theater arts scholarship, and the following year she married her high school sweetheart, James Welch, with whom she had two children. She assumed his last name and kept it throughout her life. She won several parts in local theater productions.

In 1960, Welch got a job as a weather presenter at KFMB, a local San Diego television station. Because her family life and television duties were so demanding, she decided to give up her drama classes. She separated from James Welch, and moved with her two children to Dallas, Texas, where she made a "precarious living" as a model for Neiman Marcus and as a cocktail waitress.

== Career ==
=== 1964–1966: Early works and breakthrough ===
Welch originally intended to move to New York City from Dallas, but moved back to Los Angeles in 1963 and started applying for roles with film studios. During this period she met one-time child actor and Hollywood agent Patrick Curtis, who became her personal and business manager. They developed a plan to turn Welch into a sex symbol. To avoid typecasting as a Latina, he convinced her to use her ex-husband's surname. She was cast in small roles in two films, A House Is Not a Home (1964) and the Elvis Presley musical Roustabout (1964). She also had small roles on the television series Bewitched, McHale's Navy and The Virginian, and appeared on the weekly variety series The Hollywood Palace as a billboard girl and presenter. She was one of many actresses who auditioned for the role of Mary Ann Summers on the television series Gilligan's Island.

Welch's first featured role was in the beach film A Swingin' Summer (1965). She won the Deb Star that year, while her photo in a Life magazine layout called "The End of the Great Girl Drought!" created a buzz around town. She was strongly considered for the role of Domino in Thunderball and was also noticed by the wife of producer Saul David, who recommended her to 20th Century Fox, which signed her to a seven-year non-exclusive contract covering five pictures over the next five years and two floaters. Studio executives considered changing her name to "Debbie", thought easier to pronounce than "Raquel"; she refused, wanting her real name "Raquel Welch". After screen testing for Saul David's Our Man Flint, she was cast in a leading role in David's sci-fi film Fantastic Voyage (1966), in which she portrayed a member of a medical team that is miniaturized and injected into the body of an injured scientist with the mission to save his life. The film was a hit and made her a star.

This 1966 promotional still of Welch in the deerskin bikini became a bestselling poster and turned her into an instant pin-up girl.

Fox loaned Welch to Hammer Studios in Britain where she starred in the science fiction film One Million Years B.C. (1966), a remake of the Hal Roach film One Million B.C. (1940). Her only costume was a two-piece deerskin bikini; she was described as "wearing mankind's first bikini" and the fur bikini was described as a "definitive look of the 1960s". The New York Times hailed her in its review of the film, released in the UK in 1966 and in the U.S. in 1967, as a "marvelous breathing monument to womankind". One author said, "although she had only three lines in the film, her luscious figure in a fur bikini made her a star and the dream girl of millions of young moviegoers". A publicity still of her in the bikini became a bestselling poster and turned her into an instant pin-up girl. The film raised Welch's stature as a leading sex symbol of the era. In 2011, Time magazine listed Welch's B.C. bikini in the "Top Ten Bikinis in Pop Culture".

In 1966, Welch starred with Marcello Mastroianni in the Italian crime film Shoot Loud, Louder... I Don't Understand for Joseph E. Levine. The same year, she appeared in the film Sex Quartet as Elena in the segment "Fata Elena". She was the only American in the cast of the anthology comedy film The Oldest Profession (1967); her segment was directed by Michael Pfleghar. In Italy, she also appeared in a heist film for MGM, The Biggest Bundle of Them All (1968). It co-starred Edward G. Robinson, who said of Welch, "I must say she has quite a body. She has been the product of a good publicity campaign. I hope she lives up to it because a body will only take you so far."

=== 1967–1979: International stardom ===
Her first starring vehicle, the British Modesty Blaise-style spy film Fathom (1967), was filmed in Spain for 20th Century Fox. Second unit director Peter Medak said Welch "was at that time quite inexperienced, exactly like one of those American drum majorettes. But she tried very hard and went to see the rushes each day, gradually improving. 'Who's this dumb broad?' people used to say. But I said: 'You wait. I'll bet she makes it.' I liked her very much because she was such a genuine person. And she had a beautiful body which always helps." Welch said her role was "a blown up Barbie doll". Reviewing her performance, the Los Angeles Times film critic said that "each new Raquel Welch picture brings further proof that when Maria Montez died they didn't break the mold. Like Maria, Raquel can't act from here to there, but both ladies seem to have been born to be photographed ... this sappiest of spy pictures."

At this stage, Welch owed Fox four films, at one a year. She and Curtis also established their own production company, Curtwel. Fox wanted Welch to play Jennifer in their adaptation of Valley of the Dolls but she refused, wanting to play the role of Neely O'Hara. The studio was not interested, casting Patty Duke; Sharon Tate played Jennifer North.

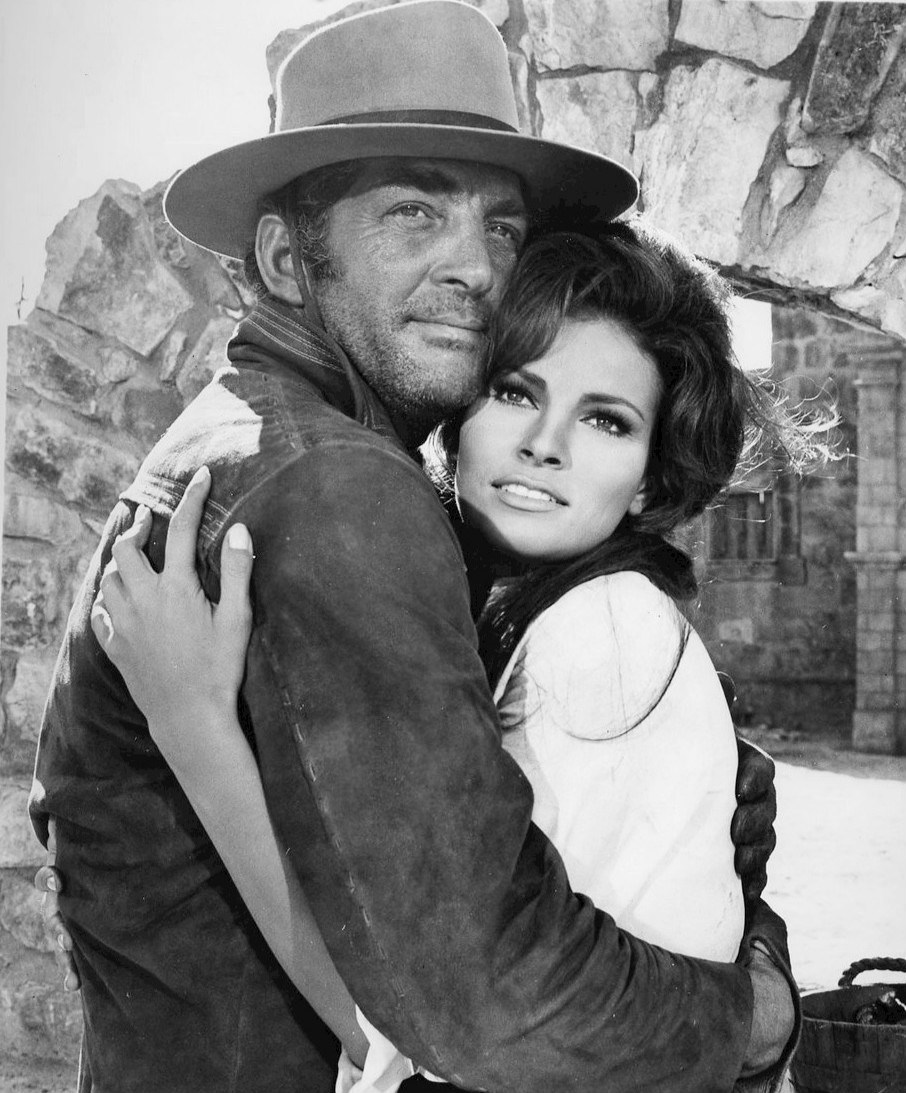
Welch with Dean Martin in Bandolero! (1968)

In England, she appeared as Lust incarnate in the Peter Cook–Dudley Moore comedy, Bedazzled (1967), a Swinging Sixties retelling of the Faust legend. It was popular, as was the Western, Bandolero! (1968), which was shot in Del Rio, Texas, at the Alamo Village. She co-starred with James Stewart and Dean Martin. "I think she's going to stack up all right," Stewart said of Welch. "No one is going to shout, 'Wow it's Anne Bancroft all over again'," said Welch of her performance, "but at least I'm not Miss Sexpot running around half naked all the time."

In 1968, Welch appeared with Frank Sinatra in the detective film Lady in Cement, a sequel to the film Tony Rome (1967). She played the socialite Kit Forrest, the romantic interest of Tony Rome. Welch later said wittily that she caught the film from time to time and realized only later that Kit Forrest was an alcoholic: "I'm watching this movie and I'm thinking, 'What the hell has she got on?' At one point, I had this epiphany: 'Oh, she's an alcoholic!' I didn't know that. How could I miss that?" She reportedly was so smitten with Sinatra that she forgot to act: "I think I was just so enamored with Frank Sinatra, you know. He's hypnotic."

Welch starred as a freedom fighter leader in 100 Rifles, a 1969 western directed by Tom Gries and filmed in Almería, Spain. It also starred Jim Brown, Burt Reynolds, and Fernando Lamas. The film provoked publicity and controversy at the time because it included a love scene between Welch and Brown that breached Hollywood's taboo against onscreen interracial intimacy. The film is remembered for the spectacular "Shower Scene" in which Welch distracts the soldiers on the train by taking a shower at a water tower along the tracks. The director, Gries, tried hard to convince Welch to do the scene naked, but she refused. It was one of the many instances Welch resisted going nude on-screen and pushed back for years against producers who wanted her to act or pose nude. In 1969, Welch also starred in the thriller Flareup and had a cameo role in the dark comedy The Magic Christian.

Welch's most controversial role came in Myra Breckinridge (1970). She took the role of the film's transsexual heroine in an attempt to be taken seriously as an actress. The production was characterized by animosity between Welch and Mae West, who walked out of the film for three days. The film was based on Gore Vidal's controversial bestseller about a man who becomes a woman through surgery. The film's producer Robert Fryer stated: "If a man were going to become a woman, he would want to become the most beautiful woman in the world. He would become Raquel Welch".

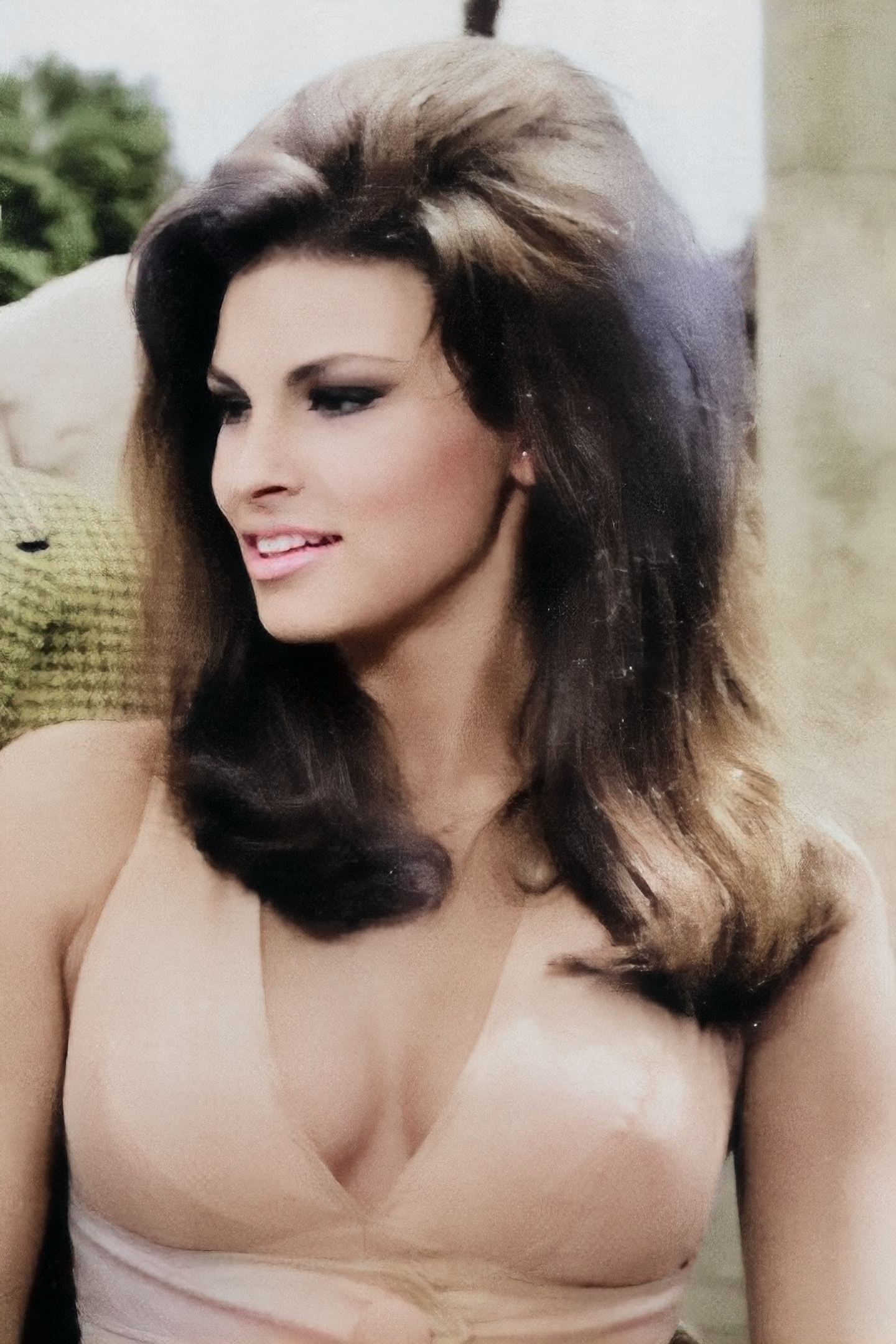
Welch in The Biggest Bundle of Them All (1968)

Her looks and fame led Playboy to dub her the "Most Desired Woman" of the 1970s. Welch presented at the Academy Awards ceremony several times during the 1970s due to her popularity. She accepted the Best Supporting Actress Oscar on behalf of fellow actress Goldie Hawn when Hawn could not be there to accept it.

On April 26, 1970, CBS released her television special Raquel! On the day of the premiere, the show received a 51 percent share on the National ARB Ratings and an overnight New York Nielsen rating of 58 percent share. Also that year Welch starred in The Beloved with co-star Richard Johnson, which she co-produced and filmed in Cyprus.

In 1971, Welch had the title role in Hannie Caulder, a Western produced by Tigon and Curtwel, which was shot in Spain. Welch was one of the few actresses, and one of the earliest, who had a lead role in a Western film. Hannie Caulder was a significant influence on later revenge films, with director Quentin Tarantino citing it as an inspiration for his 2003 film, Kill Bill: Volume 1.

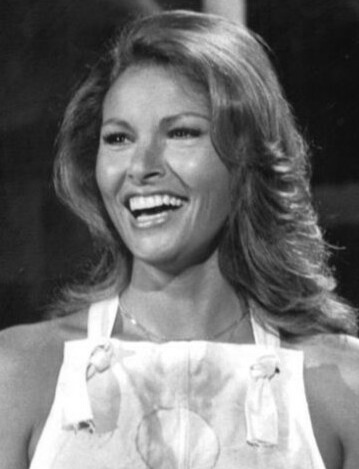
Welch in 1976

The following year, in 1972, Welch starred in Kansas City Bomber, in which she played a hardened roller derby star and single mother who tries to balance her desire for a happy personal life and her dreams of stardom. Life magazine dubbed Welch the "hottest thing on wheels" for her role. The production of the film shut down for six weeks after Welch broke her wrist doing some of her own stunts. In the interim, she flew to Budapest and filmed a cameo in Bluebeard opposite Richard Burton, and was photographed at a lavish party thrown by Burton for his then-wife Elizabeth Taylor's fortieth birthday, even though Taylor had specifically uninvited her. Despite not being considered a critical success, Kansas City Bomber was noted for its depiction of gender relations in the early 1970s. In a 2012 interview with GQ, Welch reflected on the roller derby world depicted in the film: "You have all those women out there, but the men in the front office are really running it. Which I thought was a really nice metaphor for the way a lot of women felt about their lives at that time." Also in 1972, Welch reunited with Burt Reynolds for the detective film Fuzz.

In 1973, Welch acted in two films: The Last of Sheila and The Three Musketeers. The latter—for which she won a Golden Globe as Best Actress in a Comedy—spawned a sequel, The Four Musketeers (1974). Welch was offered the title role in Alice Doesn't Live Here Anymore (1974), which earned an Oscar for its eventual star Ellen Burstyn; she also turned down the chance to play Honey Bruce in the biographical film Lenny (1974), a part that went to Valerie Perrine. In 1975, Welch appeared in The Wild Party and also performed a duet with Cher, singing "I'm a Woman" on an episode of The Cher Show. She then co-starred with Bill Cosby and Harvey Keitel in the action comedy Mother, Jugs & Speed (1976), directed by Peter Yates. Welch's character, promoted from dispatcher to emergency medical technician after threatening a sexual discrimination lawsuit, is an early example of feminism and equal pay for equal work as she breaks the "glass ceiling" doing a "man's work".

In 1977, Welch acted in the French film Animal, co-starring with Jean-Paul Belmondo. She also starred in the British swashbuckling adventure The Prince and the Pauper. Welch made a guest appearance on The Muppet Show in 1978, where she sang "I'm a Woman" with Miss Piggy. The following year, Welch guest-starred as Captain Nirvana, an alien bounty hunter, in an episode of Mork & Mindy titled "Mork vs. the Necrotons".

=== 1980–2017: Subsequent projects and later years ===
==== Television ====
In 1982, Welch starred in the Western The Legend of Walks Far Woman for NBC. Billed as her "first TV movie dramatic debut", Welch played a 19th-century Native American woman in Montana. In the summer of 1982, Welch was among the candidates considered for the role of Alexis Carrington on the ABC primetime drama Dynasty, along with Elizabeth Taylor and Sophia Loren, before the producers settled on Joan Collins.

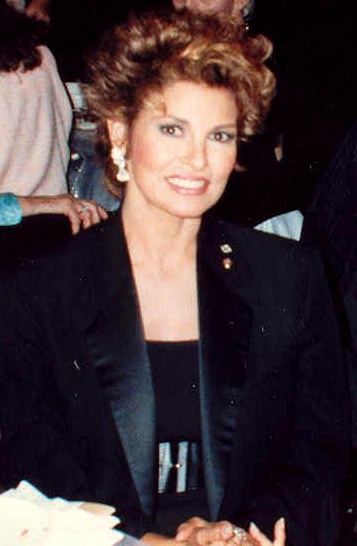
Welch at the 39th Emmy Awards Governor's Ball in September 1987

In 1987, Welch starred in the television drama Right to Die, an "unglamorous" role in which she portrayed a college professor and mother of two stricken with Lou Gehrig's disease, and asks to die with dignity.

Welch starred in the made-for-television films Scandal in a Small Town (1988), Trouble in Paradise (1989), and Torch Song (1993). In 1995, she was a guest star in Lois and Clark: The New Adventures of Superman. In the Season 2 episode "Top Copy", Welch played a television reporter and assassin who threatens to expose Clark's identity as Superman.

In 1996, Welch joined the cast of the night-time soap opera Central Park West, after CBS had already slated it for cancellation, as creator Darren Star made a final attempt to save the show by boosting its ratings late in its first season. She was a guest star on the American comedy series Sabrina, the Teenage Witch (1997), playing Sabrina's flamboyant Aunt Vesta from the realm called the Pleasuredome.

Welch acted in the Season 8 finale of the comedy series Seinfeld, titled "The Summer of George" (1997), playing an exaggerated and highly temperamental version of herself. In the episode, ranked by Zap2it as one of the top 10 episodes of Seinfeld, series character Kramer is forced to fire Welch from the lead role in a fictional Tony Award-winning musical called "Scarsdale Surprise", while the character Elaine gets into a "catfight" with her after a chance encounter on the street. Entertainment Weekly wrote, "By delivering a pitch-perfect performance as a fire-breathing prima donna, Welch also poked fun at her reputation (fairly earned or not) for being difficult to work with."

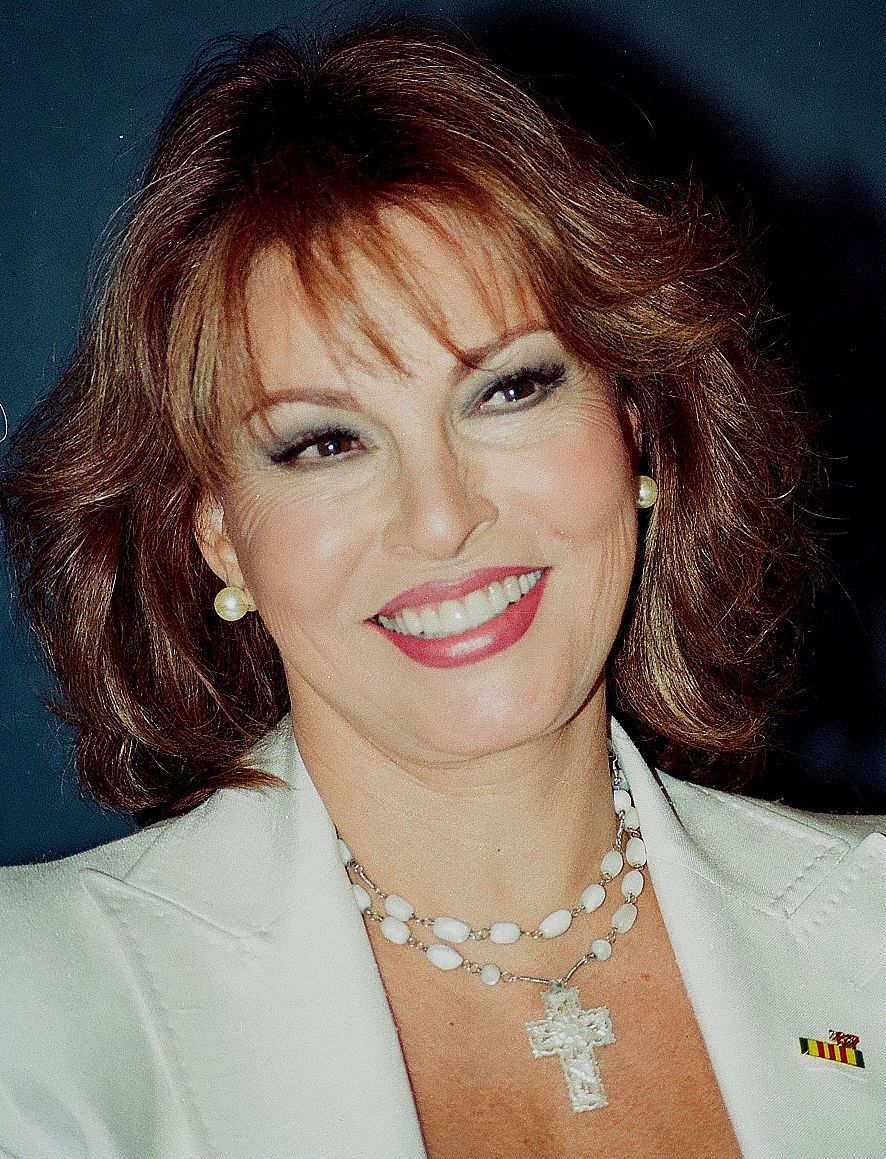
Welch in 2000

In 2002, Welch co-starred in the PBS series American Family, a story about a Mexican American family in East Los Angeles, with Edward James Olmos. Her role as Aunt Dora, the "drama queen of the family", marked the first time in her 40-year career that Welch had acknowledged her heritage as a Latina.

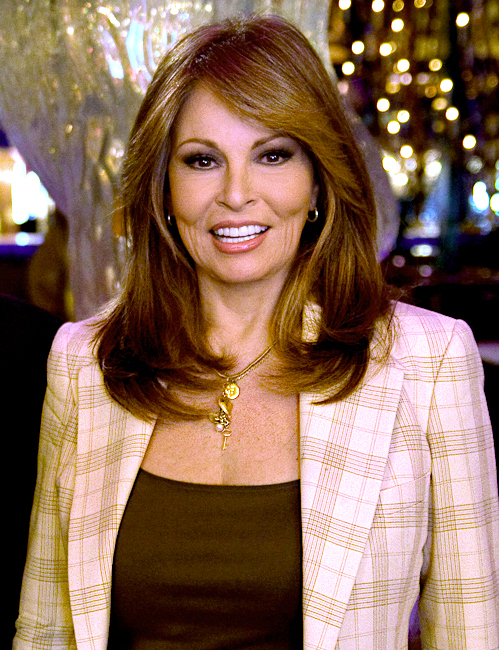
Welch in 2010

In 2008, Welch appeared in Welcome to The Captain on CBS, playing a "sultry actress"; according to one critic, she was "spoofing herself". She guest starred on CSI: Miami in 2012 and played Aunt Lucia in the 2013 Lifetime original movie House of Versace. In 2015, she portrayed Miss Sally May Anderson in the television drama The Ultimate Legacy.

Welch played the mother-in-law of Barry Watson's character in a Canadian sitcom titled Date My Dad (2017) where she reunited with Robert Wagner on screen, five decades after starring together in The Biggest Bundle of Them All.

==== Film ====
Welch was due to star in a 1982 adaptation of John Steinbeck's Cannery Row, but was abruptly fired by the producers a few weeks into production. The studio claimed she had breached her contract by not attending a required morning makeup session, and she was replaced by Debra Winger, not yet a big star, who was paid less. By firing her in this way Welch could be replaced without the studio having to buy out the remaining $194,000 of her $250,000 contract. Welch sued MGM for $20m for breach of contract. Studio executives claimed in testimony the reason Welch was following through with the trial was that she was an actress over 40, an age at which actresses could usually no longer get roles. Welch's evidence at trial proved there was a conspiracy to blame her falsely for the film's budget problems and delays; the jury sided with Welch and awarded her $10.8 million against MGM in 1986. Welch said that she thought the judgment was for "more money than the movie actually grossed".

Despite winning the case, Welch said she wished the whole episode had never happened. "I just wanted to clear my reputation and get back to my work, my work in movies", she said. She said that the incident ruined her career and perpetuated the notion that she was a difficult actress with whom to work; she was blackballed by the industry and the incident affected the remainder of her film career.

In 1994, Welch made a cameo appearance in Naked Gun 33 1/3: The Final Insult, in the scene where Leslie Nielsen's character crashes the Academy Awards. In 2001, she had a cameo in the comedy film Legally Blonde with Reese Witherspoon, playing a wealthy ex-wife in court. Also that year, Welch appeared in Tortilla Soup, a family comedy-drama inspired by Ang Lee's Eat Drink Man Woman, playing Hortensia, a domineering mother determined to marry the master chef who thinks he is losing his sense of smell and taste.

Welch starred in Forget About It (2006), a mobster comedy in which Burt Reynolds, Robert Loggia, and Charles Durning competed for her affection. She played a single billionaire grandmother in the romantic comedy How to Be a Latin Lover (2017).

==== Stage ====
In December 1972, Welch made her nightclub debut at the Las Vegas Hilton; her act preceded Elvis Presley's. Over the next decade, she took her nightclub act to other venues, and starred in television specials featuring her singing and dancing. She released the dance single "This Girl's Back In Town", which peaked at No. 29 on Billboard's dance club chart in 1988, along with a music video.

In December 1981, Welch starred on Broadway in Woman of the Year for two weeks, filling in for Lauren Bacall in the title role while Bacall was on vacation. Critics were so enthusiastic about Welch's performance, she was invited back to perform the role again for six months in 1982.

In 1997, Welch starred on Broadway in Victor/Victoria, following Julie Andrews and Liza Minnelli in the title role. Theatre critic Jamie Portman wrote that her glamour made Welch "scarcely believable as the vulnerable Victoria and totally unbelievable as the swaggering tuxedoed Victor", but that she at least "earns high marks for valor" for attempting to breathe life into "the misbegotten musical version of Victor/Victoria".

== Achievements and awards ==
In 1975, Welch won a Golden Globe Award for Best Motion Picture Actress in a Musical or Comedy for The Three Musketeers. She was also nominated for a Golden Globe Award for her performance in the television drama Right to Die (1987). In 1996, Welch received a star on the Hollywood Walk of Fame at 7021 Hollywood Boulevard. In 2001, she was awarded the Imagen Foundation Lifetime Achievement Award for her positive promotion of Americans of Latin heritage throughout her career. In 2012, the Film Society of Lincoln Center presented a special retrospective of the films of Welch at the Walter Reade Theater.

== Beauty and business career ==
The Raquel Welch Total Beauty and Fitness Program book and videos were first released in 1984. The book, written by Welch with photographs by André Weinfeld, includes a hatha yoga fitness program, her views on healthy living and nutrition, as well as beauty and personal style. The Multi-Platinum collection of Fitness and Yoga videos were produced and directed by Weinfeld. As a businesswoman, Welch succeeded with her signature line of wigs. She also began a jewelry and skincare line, although neither of those ventures compared to the success of her wig collection HAIRuWEAR.

In January 2007, Welch was selected as the newest face of MAC Cosmetics Beauty Icon series. Her line features several limited-edition makeup shades in glossy black and tiger-print packaging. The tiger print motif of the collection celebrates Welch's feline and sensuous image: "strong and wild, yet sultry and exotic".

Her personal beauty regime included abstinence from alcohol and tobacco; daily yoga; and moisturising with Bag Balm.

== Personal life ==
=== Marriages and relationships ===
Welch married her high school sweetheart, James Welch, in Las Vegas on May 8, 1959. They had two children, a son and a daughter, Tahnee. The couple separated in 1962 and divorced in 1964; she retained the surname Welch for the rest of her life.

She married publicist Patrick Curtis in Paris on February 14, 1967, and they divorced on January 6, 1972. Curtis later said to the tabloid newspapers that Welch had had an abortion during their marriage. Spanish media reported that during the shooting of 100 Rifles in Spain in 1968, Welch, while married to Curtis, had a relationship with Spanish actor Sancho Gracia, who had a small role in the film, and that Welch's husband, upon finding out about the affair, chased Gracia at gunpoint through the hotel where they were staying in Aguadulce.

Subsequent boyfriends included football player Joe Namath, producer Robert Evans and comedian Freddie Prinze.

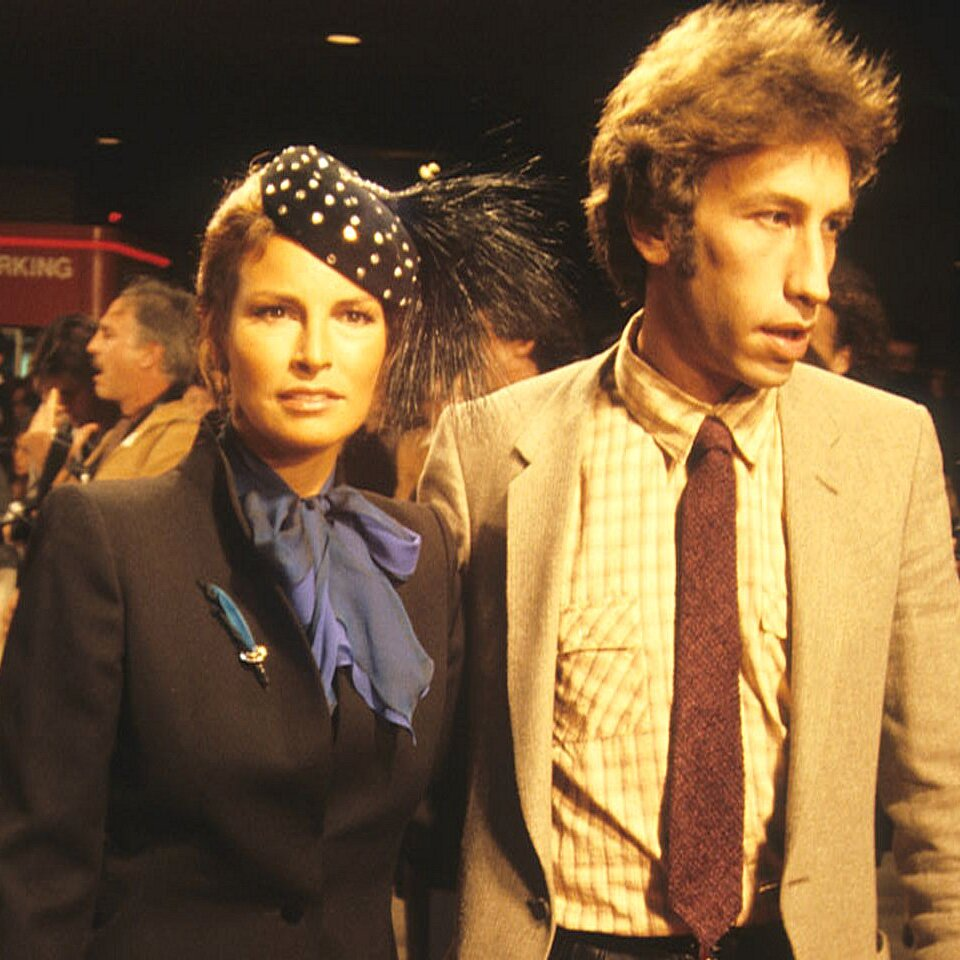
Welch and André Weinfeld at the premiere of The Rose in 1979, a year before their marriage

On July 5, 1980, she married producer André Weinfeld in Cabo San Lucas. In early February 1983, while vacationing in Mustique, Welch suffered a miscarriage three months into her pregnancy. Her marriage to Weinfeld ended in August 1990.

In 1996, after keeping a low romantic profile for several years, she dated former British boxing champion Gary Stretch, who was younger than Welch's children.

Richie Palmer, co-owner of Mulberry Street Pizzeria, who had one son from a previous marriage, broke off his engagement with business partner and actress Cathy Moriarty to pursue Welch in October 1997. In July 17, 1999, they married at her home in Beverly Hills; they separated in August 2003 and divorced a year later.

In 2011, Welch told Elle magazine she would not remarry. Her last known relationship, during the early-to-mid-2010s, was with American Idol producer Nigel Lythgoe.

=== Religion ===
Welch was Presbyterian, the religion of her childhood, and had said, "I remembered the wonderful sense of peace I'd felt when sitting under the protection and grace of my mother's faith." She was a faithful member of Calvary Presbyterian Church, a Presbyterian Church in America (PCA) congregation in Glendale, which she described as a "beautiful little church" where the people "weren't Hollywood types. They were modest, unassuming, cheerful and friendly. They welcomed me." Welch said her faith helped her after the death of her mother, a devout Presbyterian, and her sister's recovery from cancer.

=== Public image ===
While her image in the 1960s was that of a torrid sex temptress, Welch's private life was quite different. Welch once famously said, "What I do on the screen is not to be equated with what I do in my private life. Privately, I am understated and dislike any hoopla." She also said, "I was not brought up to be a sex symbol, nor is it in my nature to be one. The fact that I became one is probably the loveliest, most glamorous, and fortunate misunderstanding."

Welch posed for Playboy magazine in 1979, but she never did a fully nude shoot. Hugh Hefner later wrote, "Raquel Welch, one of the last of the classic sex symbols, came from the era when you could be considered the sexiest woman in the world without taking your clothes off. She declined to do complete nudity, and I yielded gracefully. The pictures prove her point." Welch refused to take all her clothes off on screen or pose naked throughout her five-decade career, saying this was the way she was brought up.

=== Political views ===
With Nancy Reagan at a state dinner in the White House in 1985.

Welch showed support for the Vietnam War troops, appearing at United Service Organizations (USO) shows in 1967, often with Bob Hope. Welch appeared in 2011 on Your World with Neil Cavuto, briefly discussing the conservative candidates choices during political debates for the 2012 election and that she doesn't discuss politics very much in Hollywood. In 2014, during an appearance on The O'Reilly Factor, Welch described herself as being on the conservative side, attributing it to her upbringing and her mother's Midwestern values. In 2015, Welch attended a gathering for the Republican Jewish Coalition in Beverly Hills.

== Death ==
Welch died from cardiac arrest on February 15, 2023, at her home in Los Angeles, aged 82. At the time of her death, Welch was also suffering from Alzheimer's disease.

== Legacy ==
Welch helped transform America's feminine ideal into its current state. Her beautiful looks and eroticism made her the definitive 1960s and 1970s sex icon, rather than the blonde bombshell of the late 1950s as typified by Marilyn Monroe, Jayne Mansfield, and others. Welch became a star in the mid-1960s and was exotic, brunette, and smolderingly sexual. Her countless publicity photos helped to popularize her image, dress style, and 1960s and 1970s fashion trends. Welch was among actresses who made big hair popular.

== In popular culture ==
Welch is mentioned in the 1970 song "Raquel Welch" by Shel Silverstein and in the 1971 song, "One's on the Way" also written by Silverstein but made popular by Loretta Lynn. Welch is also mentioned in "Unknown Stuntman", the theme song to The Fall Guy, starring Lee Majors, who also recorded the song. She is also mentioned in the Al Jarreau song "Love Is Real" from the Grammy-winning 1980 album This Time, where Jarreau sings "Raquel and Redford are the tops". Welch is also mentioned in the Tori Amos song "Glory of the 80's" from her 1999 album To Venus and Back, referencing Amos's experience as a background dancer in a Crystal Light commercial starring Welch with the lyric: "Auditioning for reptiles in their Raquel Welsh campaign."

In the 1994 film The Shawshank Redemption, the poster in Andy Dufresne's cell that hid his escape tunnel was the famous pinup image of Welch in One Million Years B.C..

== Filmography ==
=== Film ===
| Year | Title | Role | Notes | Ref |
|---|---|---|---|---|
| 1964 | A House Is Not a Home | Polly's Girl | | |
| 1964 | Roustabout | College Girl | Uncredited | |
| 1965 | A Swingin' Summer | Jeri | | |
| 1966 | Fantastic Voyage | Cora Peterson | First film under contract to 20th Century Fox | |
| 1966 | Shoot Loud, Louder... I Don't Understand | Tania Montini | Made in Italy for Joseph E. Levine | |
| 1966 | Sex Quartet | Elena | Segment: "Fata Elena"; Also known as The Queens | |
| 1966 | One Million Years B.C. | Loana | | |
| 1967 | The Oldest Profession | Nini | Segment: "The Gay Nineties" | |
| 1967 | Fathom | Fathom Harvill | | |
| 1967 | Bedazzled | Lust / Lilian Lust | | |
| 1968 | The Biggest Bundle of Them All | Juliana | | |
| 1968 | Bandolero! | Maria Stoner | | |
| 1968 | Lady in Cement | Kit Forrester | | |
| 1969 | 100 Rifles | Sarita | | |
| 1969 | Flareup | Michele | | |
| 1969 | The Magic Christian | Priestess of the Whip | | |
| 1970 | Myra Breckinridge | Myra Breckinridge | | |
| 1971 | The Beloved | Elena | Also known as Sin and Restless | |
| 1971 | Hannie Caulder | Hannie Caulder | | |
| 1972 | Fuzz | Det. Eileen McHenry | | |
| 1972 | Kansas City Bomber | K.C. Carr | | |
| 1972 | Bluebeard | Magdalena | | |
| 1973 | The Last of Sheila | Alice Wood | | |
| 1973 | The Three Musketeers | Constance Bonacieux | Golden Globe Award for Best Actress in a Motion Picture – Musical or Comedy | |
| 1974 | The Four Musketeers | Constance Bonacieux | | |
| 1975 | The Wild Party | Queenie | | |
| 1976 | Mother, Jugs & Speed | Jennifer Jurgens a.k.a. "Jugs" | | |
| 1977 | The Prince and the Pauper | Lady Edith | Also known as Crossed Swords | |
| 1977 | Animal | Jane Gardner | Also known as Stuntwoman | |
| 1994 | Naked Gun 33 1/3: The Final Insult | Herself | Uncredited | |
| 1998 | Chairman of the Board | Grace Kosik | Nominated: Golden Raspberry Award for Worst Supporting Actress | |
| 1998 | What I Did for Love | Jacqueline | | |
| 1999 | Get Bruce | Herself | Documentary | |
| 2001 | Legally Blonde | Mrs. Windham Vandermark | | |
| 2001 | Tortilla Soup | Hortensia | | |
| 2006 | Forget About It | Christine DeLee | | |
| 2016 | The Ultimate Legacy | Miss Sally Mae Anderson | TV movie | |
| 2017 | How to Be a Latin Lover | Celeste Birch | Final Film Role | |

=== Television ===
| Year | Title | Role | Notes | Ref |
|---|---|---|---|---|
| 1964–1965 | The Hollywood Palace | Billboard Girl | Season one regular | |
| 1964 | The Virginian | Saloon Girl | Episode: "Ryker" | |
| 1964 | McHale's Navy | Lt. Wilson | Episode: "McHale, the Desk Commando" | |
| 1964 | Bewitched | Stewardess | Episode: "Witch or Wife" | |
| 1964 | The Rogues | Miss France | Episode: "Hugger-Mugger, by the Sea" | |
| 1965 | Wendy and Me | Lila Harrison | Episode: "Wendy Sails in the Sunset" | |
| 1965 | The Baileys of Balboa | Beverly | Episode: "Sam and the Invisible Man" | |
| 1970 | Raquel! | Herself | Television Special | |
| 1971 | Rowan & Martin's Laugh-In | Guest Performer | Episode: "#5.1" | |
| 1974 | Really, Raquel | Herself | Television Special | |
| 1976 | Saturday Night Live | Host | Episode: "Raquel Welch/Phoebe Snow/John Sebastian"; Also known as NBC's Saturday Night | |
| 1978 | The Muppet Show | Herself | Episode: "Raquel Welch" | |
| 1979 | Mork & Mindy | Captain Nirvana | Episode: "Mork vs. the Necrotons" | |
| 1980 | From Raquel with Love | Herself | Television Special | |
| 1982 | The Legend of Walks Far Woman | Walks Far Woman | Television film Bronze Wrangler for Fictional Television Drama | |
| 1987 | Right to Die | Emily Bauer | Television film Nominated: Golden Globe Award for Best Actress – Miniseries or Television Film | |
| 1988 | Scandal in a Small Town | Leda Beth Vincent | Television film | |
| 1989 | Trouble in Paradise | Rachel | Television film | |
| 1993 | Torch Song | Paula Eastman | Television film | |
| 1993 | Evening Shade | Cynthia Gibson | Episode: "Small Town Girl" | |
| 1993 | Hollyrock-a-Bye Baby | Shelly Millstone | Voice, television special | |
| 1994 | Tainted Blood | Elizabeth Hayes | Television film | |
| 1995 | Lois & Clark: The New Adventures of Superman | Diana Stride | Episode: "Top Copy" | |
| 1995 | Happily Ever After: Fairy Tales for Every Child | La Madrasta | Voice, episode: "Cinderella" | |
| 1996 | Central Park West | Dianna Brock | Season 2 Regular; Also known as CPW | |
| 1996 | Sabrina the Teenage Witch | Aunt Vesta | Episode: "Third Aunt from the Sun" | |
| 1997 | Seinfeld | Herself | Episode: "The Summer of George" | |
| 1997–2000 | Spin City | Abby Lassiter | 3 episodes | |
| 2002 | American Family | Aunt Dora | Season 1 semi-regular | |
| 2002 | Jim Brown: All-American | Herself | Documentary | |
| 2004 | 8 Simple Rules | Jackie | Episode: "Vanity Unfair" | |
| 2008 | Welcome to The Captain | Charlene Van Ark | Series regular | |
| 2012 | CSI: Miami | Vina Navarro | Episode: "Rest in Pieces" | |
| 2013 | House of Versace | Aunt Lucia | Television film | |
| 2015 | The Ultimate Legacy | Miss Sally May Anderson | Television film | |
| 2017 | Date My Dad | Rosa | Recurring guest star | |
| 2025 | I Am Raquel Welch | Herself (archive) | Archive documentary | |

== Stage ==
| Year | Title | Role | Notes |
|---|---|---|---|
| 1973–1974 | Raquel and the World of Sid and Marty Krofft | Herself | Las Vegas Hilton; Adapted into the television special Really Raquel |
| 1981–1983 | Woman of the Year | Tess Harding | Palace Theatre |
| 1995 | The Millionairess | Epifania Ognisanti di Parerga | Alexandra Theatre |
| 1997 | Victor/Victoria | Victoria Grant/Victor Grazinski | Marquis Theatre |

== Selected discography ==
=== Album appearances ===
| Year | Title | Album |
|---|---|---|
| 1965 | "I'm Ready to Groove" | A Swingin' Summer: Music from the Original Motion Picture Soundtrack |

=== Singles ===
| Year | Title | Peak chart positions |
| Year | Title | US Dance |
|---|---|---|
| 1988 | "This Girl's Back in Town" | 29 |

== Books ==
- Raquel Welch: Raquel: The Raquel Welch Total Beauty and Fitness Program, Publisher: Henry Holt and Company (October 1, 1984), ISBN 978-0-03069-549-0
- Raquel Welch: Raquel: Beyond the Cleavage, Publisher: Weinstein Books (March 29, 2010), ISBN 978-1-60286-097-1

== See also ==
- Fur bikini of Raquel Welch
