= Sin (1971 film) =

- Sin poster
- Directed by: George P. Cosmatos
- Written by: George P. Cosmatos
- Based on: The Day of the Midwife by George P. Cosmatos
- Produced by: Patrick Curtis; George P. Cosmatos
- Starring: Raquel Welch; Richard Johnson; Jack Hawkins; Flora Robson
- Cinematography: Marcello Gatti
- Edited by: J. Terry Williams
- Music by: Giannis Markopoulos
- Production company: Curtwel Productions
- Distributed by: Joseph Brenner Associates; Euro London Films Ltd
- Release date: 1971 (United Kingdom)
- Running time: 86 minutes
- Countries: United Kingdom; Italy; United States
- Language: English
- Budget: $500,000

Sin (also known as The Beloved and Restless) is a 1971 film written and directed by George P. Cosmatos and marked his directorial debut. The film was produced by Curtwel Productions and stars Raquel Welch and Richard Johnson. It is set on an island and was filmed in Cyprus.

== Plot ==
A beautiful but frustrated housewife begins an affair with a former childhood friend. When her suspicious husband starts to show signs of jealousy, the adulterous couple plot to murder him.

== Cast ==
- Raquel Welch as Elena
  - Tahnee Welch as Young Elena
- Renato Romano as Yanni
  - Damon Welch as Young Yanni
- Richard Johnson as Orestes
- Jack Hawkins as Father Nicholas
- Flora Robson as Antigone
- Frank Wolff as Hector

== Production ==
It was the second film produced by Patrick Curtis, Raquel Welch's then-husband and manager. It was financed by a group of wealthy Cypriot businessmen. It was based on a play by George P. Cosmatos titled The Day of the Midwife. Richard Johnson and Welch took no salary, receiving only expenses and a share of the profits. The movie went unreleased for many years.

=== Filming ===
Filming began on location in the Greek Cypriot village of Karmi, Cyprus on August 15, 1970.

== Release ==
It was released in the US by Cinemation.

On 2 June 1986, the British Board of Film Classification announced that the film's home video release would receive a 15 certificate rating.

=== Home media ===
The film was originally released in the United Kingdom in 1986 on VHS and given a 15 certificate rating. All home media releases in the U.K. were titled Sin. It was reissued in the U.K. by Scorebox Film Group on DVD in 2008 and again by Screenbound Pictures in August 2017.
