= A Swingin' Summer =

1965 film by Robert Sparr

- Theatrical release poster
- Directed by: Robert Sparr
- Screenplay by: Leigh Chapman; Robert Sparr (uncredited)
- Story by: Reno Carell
- Produced by: Kenneth Raphael; Larry Goldblatt; Reno Carell
- Starring: Raquel Welch; James Stacy; Lori Williams
- Cinematography: Ray Fernstrom
- Edited by: James T. Heckert
- Music by: Harry Betts
- Production company: National Talent Consultants
- Distributed by: United Screen Arts
- Release date: 1965
- Running time: 80 minutes
- Country: United States
- Language: English

A Swingin' Summer is a 1965 comedy film in the beach party genre. It was directed and co-written by Robert Sparr. Raquel Welch stars in her first featured film role and makes her singing debut in the film.

== Plot ==
A trio of college kids – all friends of each other – attempt to ensure summer jobs for themselves by becoming concert promoters at a lakeside dance pavilion that is in danger of closing.

A local lifeguard, Turk, jealous of both Rick and Mickey, tries to ruin their plan and at the same time tries to steal Rick’s girl, Cindy – who has secretly arranged for her rich dad to finance the pavilion. Rick flips when he finds out about Cindy’s dad, and Turk tries to sabotage the dance hall with some hired goons – who, after failing, bully Turk into ripping the place off. In the meantime, bookworm Jeri, takes off her glasses, lets down her hair and causes some new problems.

In spite of all the drama, the kids actually succeed in securing an impressive roster of brand-name talent to the pavilion.

== Cast ==
=== Principal cast ===
Actor	Role
Raquel Welch	Jeri
James Stacy	Mickey
William Wellman Jr.	Rick
Quinn O'Hara	Cindy
Martin West	Turk
Mary Mitchel	Shirley

=== Supporting cast ===
The film features special appearances by Allan Jones as Mr. Johnson, Gary Lewis & the Playboys, The Rip Chords, Donnie Brooks and The Righteous Brothers. Others include Gypsy Boots, Lili Kardell as Sandra, Robert Blair as Tony, Buck Holland as Lou, and Lori Williams as one of the Swingin' Summer Girls.

== Soundtrack ==
A Swingin' Summer marketed internationally on the appeal of Raquel Welch

The soundtrack featured songs performed by Raquel Welch, The Rip Chords, Jody Miller, Gary & the Playboys, The Righteous Brothers, Donnie Brooks and Carol Connors. The soundtrack album was issued on Hanna Barbera Records.

== Production notes ==
Although she received sixth billing in the U.S. release, Welch received top billing – with her name above the title – on posters for the Italian release, which was renamed The Warm Night.

The film was shot on location at Lake Arrowhead, California in the summer of 1964 and released in the summer of 1965. Filmink called it "a lake party" movie.

The bearded man who is seen from behind and mistaken for a woman in a one-piece topless bathing suit is Gypsy Boots (real name: Robert Bootzin), the American fitness pioneer who is credited with laying the foundation for the acceptance by mainstream America of "alternative" lifestyles such as yoga and health food.

Taglines for the film read: They're Lovin', Laughin' and Livin' it up and for kicks playing "Chicken on Water Skis!" and Spread Out the Beach Towels...Grab Your Gals...it's gonna be A Swingin' Summer!

The film was the first release of Dale Robertson's film releasing company United Screen Arts.

Linda Evans was originally cast in the role of Cindy.

== See also ==
- List of American films of 1965
